= Chris McKay =

American filmmaker and animator (born 1973)

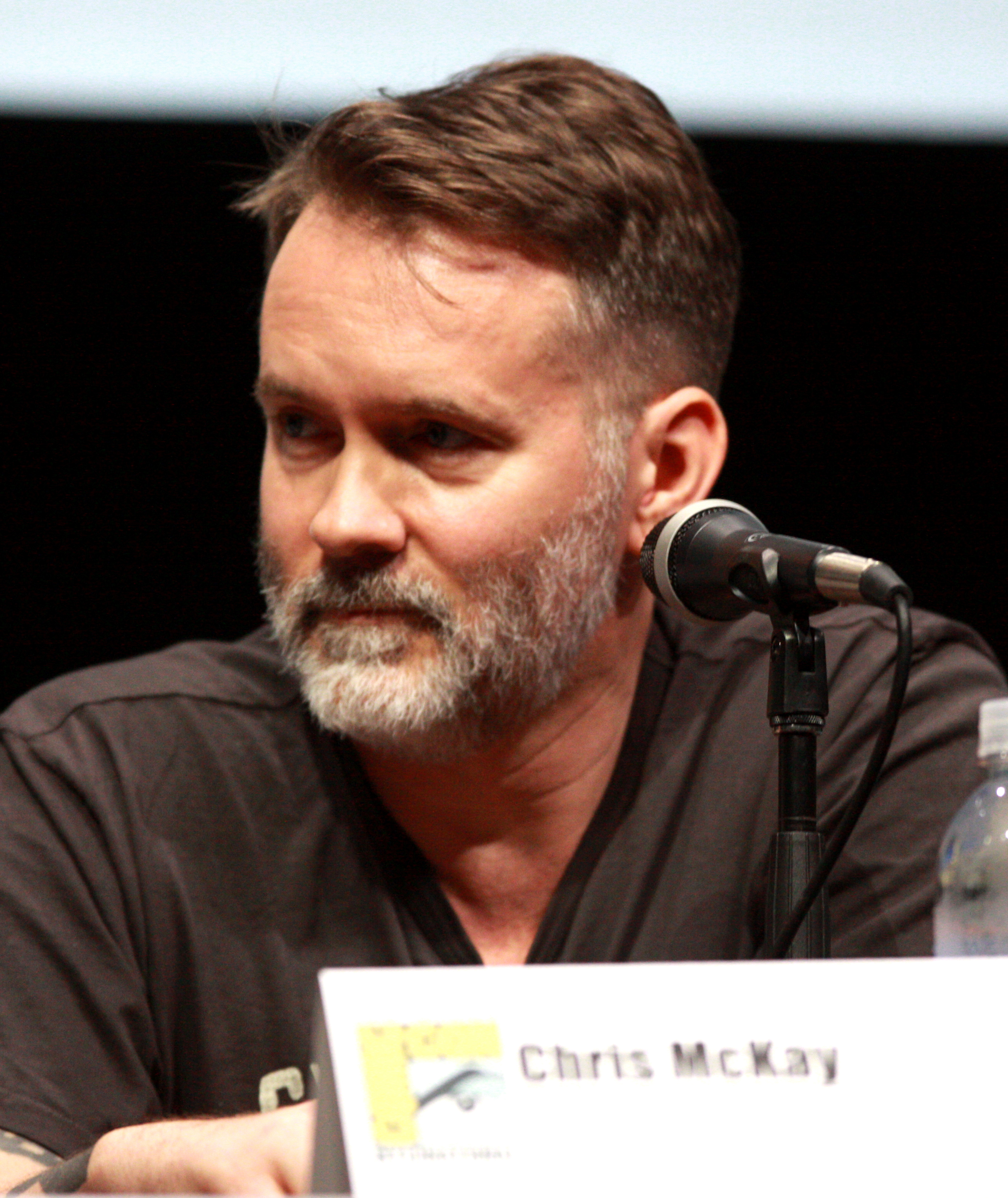
- McKay at the 2013 San Diego Comic-Con
- Born: Christopher McKay; November 11, 1973 (age 52); Winter Park, Florida, U.S.
- Education: Columbia College Chicago
- Occupations: Filmmaker; animator; editor
- Years active: 1995–present
- Notable work: Robot Chicken; The Lego Batman Movie; The Tomorrow War; Renfield

Christopher McKay (born November 11, 1973) is an American filmmaker and animator. He is best known for directing and editing three seasons of Robot Chicken and two seasons of Moral Orel. He made his feature directorial debut with The Lego Batman Movie (2017), and has also directed The Tomorrow War (2021), and Renfield (2023).

== Early life and education ==
McKay was born in Winter Park, Florida, but spent most of his childhood in Chicago, Illinois. Growing up, McKay was inspired by Alfred Hitchcock films and decided to pursue film. He shot his earliest work on his parents' Super 8 film camera. McKay attended Southern Illinois University for two years as a film student, and completed his degree at Columbia College Chicago. While studying in Chicago, McKay attended his first film shoot for the 1989 comedy Uncle Buck.

== Career ==
In his early career McKay worked at several video and equipment rental companies. After purchasing production equipment of his own, he worked for three years shooting and editing music videos, industrial videos and local films. Then he started an editing job at a production company where he completed his first film 2wks, 1yr. McKay started his career as an editor, after leaving that company he first edited a film of his friend, titled Kwik Stop.

=== Television ===
In 2004, McKay moved to Los Angeles and landed an editing job at the animation studio ShadowMachine. He started work on the first episode of Robot Chicken, a stop motion adult animated sketch comedy TV series created by Seth Green and Matthew Senreich. McKay created and voiced the series' first end title sequence.

In 2006, McKay started work on animated series Moral Orel for Adult Swim, whose creator Dino Stamatopoulos said "really deserve[d] a producer credit" on the series, to which McKay replied that he would "really like to do is direct." He went on to direct episodes for the second and third seasons.

His work on Moral Orel impressed Matt and Seth, who offered him to direct Robot Chicken and in 2007, McKay directed the third, fourth, and the fifth seasons of the series, aired on Adult Swim.

In 2007, McKay worked as editor and visual effect artist on the special episode Robot Chicken: Star Wars with Seth, which aired on June 17, 2007. Then in 2008, he also worked on the Robot Chicken: Star Wars Episode II as co-producer and animation editor. In 2010, McKay directed and co-produced the final installment of the special episodes, Robot Chicken: Star Wars Episode III.

In 2009, McKay co-produced and directed the complete first season of the animated sci-fi adventure series Titan Maximum on Cartoon Network.

=== Film ===
In 2011, Warner Bros. Pictures hired McKay to join directors Phil Lord and Christopher Miller on The Lego Movie to co-direct the film's animation, the film was released domestically on February 7, 2014, and grossed over $468 million against a reported budget of $60 million. While Lord and Miller were working on 22 Jump Street, they sent McKay to Australia to supervise all animation, editing, effects, lighting and rendering of The Lego Movie.

In March 2014, Warner Bros. set McKay to direct the sequel to the 2014 hit The Lego Movie, which Lord and Miller would produce, and Michelle Morgan and Jared Stern would write. On October 10, WB announced the spin-off film The Lego Batman Movie, pushing back The Lego Movie sequel and fast-tracking development. McKay directed The Lego Batman Movie, which was released on February 10, 2017. Seth Grahame-Smith co-wrote the screenplay, while Will Arnett reprised the voice of Batman.

In February 2015, Warner Bros. announced the development of a theatrical Adventure Time animated film adaptation, which would be produced and written by creator Pendleton Ward and produced by Roy Lee and McKay. In March 2015, McKay signed a first-look deal for being a producer with Warner Bros.

McKay was developing and was attached to direct Nightwing, as a part of the DC Extended Universe, and was also set to direct an adaptation of Jonny Quest as well as a sequel to The Lego Batman Movie titled Lego Superfriends. However, Lego Superfriends was canceled following Universal's acquisition of the Lego film rights. In September 2019, McKay was set to direct Reborn for Netflix. He, alongside Jon and Josh Silberman, was set to produce the live-action/animation film Coyote vs. Acme, based on Looney Tunes character Wile E. Coyote and directed by Dave Green. However, he departed the project by December 2020.

In 2021, it was announced that McKay would replace Dexter Fletcher as director of the film Renfield from a screenplay by Ryan Ridley from a pitch by Robert Kirkman. It had its world premiere in New Orleans on March 30, 2023, and was released in US theaters on April 14, 2023, by Universal Pictures.

== Filmography ==
=== Film ===
Director

- 2wks, 1yr (2002)
- The Lego Batman Movie (2017)
- The Tomorrow War (2021)
- Renfield (2023)

Producer

- The Lego Ninjago Movie (2017)
- Renfield (2023)

Executive producer

- The Lego Movie 2: The Second Part (2019)

Writer

Year	Title	Notes
2002	2wks, 1yr	
2020	Dolittle	Writer for reshoots (Uncredited)
2023	Dungeons & Dragons: Honor Among Thieves	Story only

Editor

- It's Now... or NEVER! (1995)
- 35 Miles from Normal (1998)
- Stricken (1998)
- Bullet on a Wire (1998)
- Kwik Stop (2001)
- 2wks, 1yr (2002)
- The Lego Movie (2014) (Also animation co-director and supervisor)

=== Television ===
Year	Title	Director	Producer	Writer	Notes
2006–2008	Moral Orel	Yes	Yes	Yes	19 episodes (director); 33 episodes (producer); 1 episode (writer)
2007–2011	Robot Chicken	Yes	Yes	No	42 episodes (director); 27 episodes (producer)
2009	Titan Maximum	Yes	Yes	No	9 episodes (director); 9 episodes (producer)
2010	Robot Chicken: Star Wars Episode III	Yes	Yes	No	TV special

Technical credits

Year	Title	Animator	Editor	VFX artist	Notes
2005–2009	Robot Chicken	Yes	Yes	Yes	21 episodes (animation editor); 25 episodes (editor); 2 episodes (VFX artist)
2005–2007	Moral Orel	Yes	Yes	Yes	2 episodes (animation editor); 15 episodes (editor); 1 episode (VFX artist)
2007	The Sarah Silverman Program	No	Yes	No	Episode "Batteries"
2007	Robot Chicken: Star Wars	No	Yes	Yes	TV special
2009	Robot Chicken: Star Wars Episode II	Yes	No	No	TV special
2009	Titan Maximum	Yes	No	Yes	7 episodes (animation editor); 5 episodes (title sequence design)
