= Twisted ToyFare Theatre =

American comic strip (1996–2011)

Publication information
- Publisher: Wizard Entertainment
- Genre: Humor
- Publication date: Winter 1996 – January 2011

Creative team
- Written by: Justin Aclin, Rob Bricken, Doug Goldstein, Bill Jensen, Jon Gutierrez, Andrew Kardon, Pat McCallum, Zach Oat, Tom Palmer, Jr., Tom Root, Matthew Senreich, Chris Ward

Collected editions
- Twisted Toyfare Theatre, Volume 1: ISBN 0967248922

Twisted ToyFare Theatre (TTT) was a popular, humorous comic strip in the monthly magazine ToyFare.

== Publication history ==
Originally titled Twisted Mego Theatre, it predominantly featured 8-inch (200 mm) scale action figures made by the Mego Corporation (a line very popular in the 1970s, during the childhood years of much of the magazine's staff), and principally those based on Marvel Comics characters, such as Spider-Man ("Mego Spidey") and the Incredible Hulk. The artwork was done in the fumetti style by photographing toys on sets built by the magazine's staff, and using Photoshop to add effects and word balloons. The series was known for its bizarre humor and pop-culture references.

Twisted Mego Theatre debuted in ToyFare's 1996 Winter Special. The strip ended when ToyFare published its final issue in January 2011.

Collectively, the strips take place in a fictional world called Megoville.

Many early Twisted ToyFare Theatre strips featured several DC Comics characters, though an early strip entitled "The Super-Friends" featured Spider-Man insulting the DC heroes for their ridiculousness. DC later filed a cease and desist order, preventing Twisted ToyFare Theatre from ever using DC characters.

The television show Robot Chicken, which features animated action figures, directly sprang from Twisted ToyFare Theatre, as former writers Tom Root and Douglas Goldstein are head writers for the show, along with fellow Twisted ToyFare Theatre alumnus Matthew Senreich.

== See also ==
- List of Twisted ToyFare Theatre stories
