= List of Twisted ToyFare Theatre stories =

The following is a list of Twisted ToyFare Theatre stories from the magazine ToyFare.

== Issues ==
Title	Year	Issue No.	
"Super Villain Jeopardy"	Sept 1997	1	1x01
Trebek will rue the day he invited Dr Doom on his game show.
"The Great Jawa Hunt"		2	1x02
Pesky Jawas get more than they bargained for when Spidey wields mighty Mjolnir.
"How to Grade Your Toys"		3	1x03
Spidey teaches Mr. T about grading toys.
"Halloween at Castle Doom"		4	1x04
Surprise Dr. Doom! You're hosting a party!
"Scream"		5	1x05
Thor in a parody of the movie Scream
"How Von Doom Stole Christmas"		6	1x06
Doom teaches Christmas a lesson in love.
"Iron Resolve"		7	1x07
Iron Man's out of the Avengers unless the Hulk can help!
"Clash of the Titans"		8	1x08
Famous Covers Spidey's no match for Mego Spidey. Or is he?
"Clash of the Titans, Part 2"		9	1x09
It'll take Beanie Babies and Spice Girls to save Megoville. Makes sense to us!
"Have a Nice Day"		10	1x10
The Power Cosmic courses through... Doom's smiling face?
"The Bat Scab"		11	1x11
Spider-Man keeps an eye on Gotham City for Batman.
"On the Road"		12	1x12
Hulk, Thor, Spidey and Conan get stranded in Smurfville. Chaos ensues.
"Jolt to the System"	Sept 1998	13	1x13
Hulk drinks too much Jolt cola and runs rampant, and pantsless, through ToyFare.
"The New Neighbors"		14	1x14
Can the Borg assimilate their friendly neighborhood Spider-Man?
"The Super Friends"		15	1x15
Spider-Man is invited to join the Justice League.
"Trick or Treat!"		16	1x16
Hulk takes the Teen Titans trick-or-treating on Halloween.
"Blinded by Science"		17	1x17
The world of Megoville is not what it seems to be, so Spock is killed.
"The Big Race"		18	1x18
It is everyone vs. everyone after Superman and the Flash tie in a race.
"Leggo my Mego"		19	1x19
Tired of losing in Megoville, Doctor Doom sets his sights on a new city to counqure - Legoville!
"The Nut Shot"'		20	1x20
Hulk and Thor try to shoot a funny home video for a thousand dollars.
"House Party"		21	1x21
No Kid 'n Play in sight, but the X-Men are throwin' a party anyway.
"Law is War"		22	1x22
When Ponch and Jon get kicked off the force, it's luchadores to the rescue!
"The Menace"		23	1x23
Everyone is waiting to see the Phantom Menace.
"Beach Blanket Mego"		24	1x24
Hot fun (and fiddler crabs, and evisceration, and stabbing deaths) in the summertime.
"Megoville Squares"		25	1x25
Doctor Doom takes the center square to block! Mwa-ha-ha!
"Mr. Spidey Goes to Coruscant"		26	1x26
Spidey takes on everyone's favorite Star Wars flick, the Phantom Menace.
"It's a Doomed World After All"		27	1x27
Doctor Doom finally learns all of the FF's greatest secrets? Not really.
"The Mego Witch Project"		28	1x28
What happens when Spidey's trapped with the Hulk at a comic con?
"Y2K Monkey Business"		29	1x29
Remember when that Y2K bug destroyed mankind? Well, it's hitting Megoville!
"X-Mas Bloody X-Mas"		30	1x30
Can Hulk revive the spirit of Christmas?
"Working for the Man"		31	1x31
Stranded cashless in Megoville, Dr. Doom must temp for the FF. Curses!
"Off to see the Wizard"		32	1x32
Spidey is transported to the magical land of Oz.
"!Viva Mego!"		33	1x33
Enjoy your visit to the Mexican Megoville... just avoid the water!
"Everything Must Go"		34	1x34
At Doom's yard sale, Dr. Strange has an out-of-body experience he won't forget.
"Large and in Charge!"		35	1x35
The Thing is left in charge of the Baxter Building for a day. Wanna see his butt?
"No Business Like Show Business"		36	1x36
The X-Men face off against Pokémon.
"Luck be a Lady"		37	1x37
The gambling bug hits, so it's off to Las Vegas.
"Hit Me Baby One More Time"		38	1x38
The Thing heads to the mall in search of some frozen yogurt, but what he finds is... adventure!
"Bad to be Good"		39	1x39
Dr. Doom, Red Skull, and other baddies try to turn over a new leaf.
"A Real American Hero"		40	1x40
Fighting for freedom over land, see, and Spidey's kitchen...GI Joe is there!
"Pets or meat"		41	1x41
Doctor Doom takes the world by storm with his new creation, collectible Mego Pals!
"Crappy New Year"		42	1x42
Mephisto shows up to celebrate the new millennium!
"A Few Good Megos"		43	1x43
Megoville unites to put an end to the menace of... Spider-Man?
"Uatu be in Pictures"		44	1x44
The Watcher puts Earth's future in the Thing's hands. Good idea.
"War is Hell!"		45	1x45
A tour of Avenger's Mansion leads to an unfortunate history lesson.
"Fear and Loathing in Eternia"		46	1x46
Spidey becomes a Master of the Universe, with disastrous results.
"Defenders Assemble"		47	1x47
Can a football phone entice Spidey to join the Defenders?
"Craptus Interruptus"		48	1x48
Spidey pursues the paper while he drops a bomb or two.
"That '70s Twisted ToyFare Theatre"		49	1x49
Travel with the Megos to an era of afros and disco.
"Gause and Effect"		50	1x50
Conan goes through anger management.
"Weapon Echhhh!"		51	1x51
the Thing tells Franklin Wolverine's origin for a bedtime story.
"Give a Hoot"		52	1x52
What's worse than the Go-Bots as a Transformers cover band?
"Redneck Rhapsody"		53	1x53
The Duke boys crash Doctor Strange's LARP.
"Snow Day"		54	1x54
When Bucky goes missing on a hunting trip, who's to blame?
"When Harry Met Spidey"		55	1x55
Spidey's off to Hogwarts to meet all the little wizards.
"Shanks for the Memories"		56	1x56
Sent to prison for a crime didn't commit, Spider-man has to survive prison life. Hijinks ensue.
"'Til Death Do You Part"		57	1x57
Ever see a wedding launched into space? You've missed out.
"DVD-Day"		58	1x58
The Watcher unveils a very cosmic DVD collection.
"Trek or Treat"		59	1x59
The Enterprise must save the whales... for some reason.
"Mego Super Heroes: The Secret Wars"		60	1x60
Even washed-up 1970s TV stars must compete to amuse the Beyonder.
"A Clone in the Dark"		61	1x61
Spidey takes on a new clone saga, Star Wars: Attack of the Clones!
"The Hunt for the Red Ork-tober"		62	1x62
Spidey and Hawkeye hit Skeletor's 1980s big-game hunting range for the world's most annoying target—Orko.
"Variations on a Theme Park"		63	1x63
The Thing and Franklin head to the theme park to teach Franklin the true meaning of disappointment.
"The Way We Wuz"		64	1x64
Learn the shocking origins of your favorite "TTT" characters. They might even be true.
"The Cold War"		65	1x65
Looks like Spidey's got a Cobra infestation—get the Raid!
"Urine Luck"		66	1x66
The Thing is kicked out of the Fantastic Four. Will he be back? (Signs point to yes)
"Idol Hands"		67	1x67
Who will win the fiercest talent competition ever for the right to star in an "Ultimate" book?
"A Lizard in Every Pot"		68	1x68
The Lizard becomes a hero. Just don't ask to see his powers.
"Ticket Masters of Evil"		69	1x69
Doctor Strange goes to a Kiss concert to keep an eye on the Dormammu.
"Twenty, Twenty, 24 Hours to Go"		70	1x70
When a nuclear bomb threatens Megoville, it's Cap to the rescue... kind of in real-time!
"The Matrix Unloaded"		71	1x71
Morpheus wants Spidey to take the red pill, but Spidey just wants to go back to bed.
"Not Another Teen TTT"		72	1x72
Visit with the Watcher as he looks through the Megoville High yearbook.
"'Bots All Folks"		73	1x73
Welcome to Battle Bots, Herbie- Torch hopes you won't survive the experience.
"Cobra Commander: Beyond Terrordrome"		74	1x74
Cobra Commander can't sleep, so he wanders around his house. Of course, his house is Cobra HQ.
"Crisis on Infinite Megovilles"		75	1x75
It's the heroes of infinite worlds vs. Aunt May with the fate of the multiverse in the balance!
"28 Smurfs Later"		76	1x76
Zombie Smurfs. What else do you need to know?
"Death by Muppet"		77	1x77
Behind the scenes at the Muppet Theater.
"Electile Dysfunction"		78	1x78
It's Bush vs. Schwarzenegger vs. Thomas Jefferson for Mayor of Megoville!
"My Big, Fat, Fat, Wedding"		79	1x79
Spidey and the Sinister Six hop a plane for adventure when Doc Ock marries Aunt May.
"CHiPs Ahoy!"		80	1x80
No Mego escapes the California Highway Patrol!
"Dome and Domer"		81	1x81
Mysterio does the greatest illusion of all time...being locked in a glass box with no food, water, or toilet for 30 days. Not really an illusion though is it?
"RISKy Business"		82	1x82
1980s super-villain icons play their Wednesday night Risk game.
"If This Be My Roast!"		83	1x83
All the super-villains give Dr Doom the roast of his life.
"I Am Legend Part One"		84	1x84
The Marvel Legends invade Megoville.
"I Am Legend Part Two"		85	1x85
Spidey takes on the Marvel Legends just to get his house to himself again.
"Heroes for Fired!"		86	1x86
Power Man and Iron Fist start their own hero for hire racket after getting canned at the copy shop.
"Head of the Class"		87	1x87
Young Uatu's show-and-tell.
"These Boots Were Made for Daywalkin'!"		88	1x88
Join Blade the vampire hunter as he stalks dangerous prey... and learns that a couple of letters really make a difference when you're spelling names on your hit list.
"Christmas on Infinite Earths"		89	1x89
Peek along with the Watcher to find out what the holidays are like for Transformers, Predators, Borgs and Lindsay Lohans.
"Masters of the University"		90	1x90
Skeletor and his friends are always running afoul of He-Man and his jerk frat. Can they become the most popular kids on campus? What is this, a movie?
"The Daredevil's Advocate"		91	1x91
Daredevil finally experiences his movie and takes the only rational course of action - he decides to sue the pants of Ben Affleck.
"Dude, Where's my Thor?"		92	1x92
Loki's a pain in the butt. But to get rid of him, Spidey has to venture into Asgard to bring back Thor. Yep, Thor's been gone.
"Nobody Does It Vader"		93	1x93
Four stormtroopers are given a dangerous mission. Here's a hint: it involves young Anakin Skywalker and Klingons.
"Seder-Masochism"		94	1x94
The Thing gets in touch with his Jewish roots by holding a Passover Seder and cleaning up Elijah Wood's puke.
"Annoy All Monsters!"		95	1x95
Godzilla terrorizes Tokyo! Well, actually, he's just hangin' out.
"Running with Xizors"		96	1x96
Our intrepid band of Stormtroopers are at it again, getting sent on a mission to the darkest corner of the Empire... the Expanded Universe!
"International House of M"		97	1x97
Spider-Man joins the New Avengers, and the New Avengers join the ranks of teams that get attacked by crazy chicks.
"Sith Sandwich"		98	1x98
Spidey gets talked into going to see Episode III. Much pain follows.
"Sauron and so Forth"		99	1x99
The dark lord of Mordor is just a dude like any of us... you know, if we were all giant, flaming eyeballs. The dude just wants his ring back!
"Giant-Size Twisted ToyFare Theatre		100	1x100
ToyFare's #100's strip is the biggest TTT ever, as Spidey attempts to undo the deaths of all of Megoville's heroes despite his own best judgement.
"As the World Turnbuckles"		101	1x101
World Wrestling News. Bodyslamming the competition.
"Corporate Alien Vs. Predator"		102	1x102
Whoever wins...gets the promotion.
"Where No Hand Has Gone Before"		103	1x103
Kirk has to go without sexually harassing someone for 30 days or he's out of Starfleet. Good luck.
"Walk Like a Man-Wolf"		104	1x104
Man-Wolf gets a tour of the family business; the Daily Bugle.
"Blue Moon, White Wedding"		105	1x105
The much misunderstood Black Bolt marries Medusa.
"Up and Adamantium!"		106	1x106
How does Wolverine show up on so many comic covers each month? And what does this have to do with Fred Flintstone?
"Probes & Cons"		107	1x107
The Troopers probe droid the universe.
"Get Smart!"		108	1x108
In what surly must be an intelligent plan, the Leader decides to make the Hulk intelligent. Hey, we're no geniuses, but that sounds pretty dumb to us.
"Sssuper-Sssize Me!"		109	1x109
Cobra combats the all-American GI Joe with their one weakness - fast food!
"Return of the Troopers"		110	1x110
After the Death Star blows up the Troopers go back to school...Jedi Academy here they come!
"My Dinner With Vengeance!"		111	1x111
In what seems to be a brilliant idea at the time, the villains all swap arch-enemies.
"Kirks Up, Ho's Down"		112	1x112
Kirk inflicts his machoism on the Next Generation crew.
"Mutiny for the Bounty"		113	1x113
The Troopers want to collect the bounty on Harrison Ford.
"A Goombah With a View"		114	1x114
Spidey goes to the Mushroom Kingdom.
"Imperious Ex!"		115	1x115
Invisible Woman leaves Mr Fantastic for the Sub-Mariner.
"The Blues Fellowship"		116	1x116
Frodo is on a mission from God to get the Fellowship back together.
"The Once and Future Kang"		117	1x117
Come experience Kang the Conqueror's 'History Comes Alive' tour. Just don't impregnate anyone.
"Clean and Super Part One"		118	1x118
Iron Man goes sober and brings prohibition to Megoville.
"Clean and Super Part Two"		119	1x119
It's hero vs. hero as Cap leads the resistance to bring back booze.
"Lord Voldemort and the Homecoming of Doom"		120	1x120
He who shall not be named goes to his reunion at Hogwarts.
"Wookie of the Year"		121	1x121
It's Life Day and Chewie realizes he didn't get Malla anything.
"Islands of Advengeance!"		122	1x122
Spidey gets a plane ticket to Hawaii and ends up crashing on a mysterious island.
"Poppin' a Cap"		123	1x123
Captain America is dead and his sidekick Bucky had to be a man and take over.
"The Mirror has Two Phasers"		124	1x124
Kirk and Spock go to the mirror universe and meet the illogical Vulcans.
"The Xbox 300"		125	1x125
Master Chief leads the Spartain warriors against God-King Mario.
"The Xbox 300 Part Two"		126	1x126
The Spartians make their last stand against the 8-bit army.
"Joe-Bra Commander"		127	1x127
When he gets fired from Cobra, Cobra Commander takes his unique skills to GI Joe.
"Chairman of the Board"		128	1x128
The Avengers travel to the land of board games to take on the Opponent.
"Smurf City - A Smurf to Kill For"		129	1x129
Hefty Smurf has to smurf the killer of his love, Goldie Smurf.
"Catch a Rising Starscream"		130	1x130
When Megatron gets arrested at the border for weapon smuggling, Starscream takes over the Decepticons.

== Collections ==
Title	Copyright	Stories Reprinted
The Best of Twisted ToyFare Theatre Volume 1	2001	2, 8, 9, 12, 14, 17, 27, 28, 31, 34, 35, 39, 40, 45, 46
The Best of Twisted ToyFare Theatre Volume 2	2001	3, 4, 7, 21, 26, 30, 42, 36, 37, 43, 44, 48, 52, Spider-Man Special
The Best of Twisted ToyFare Theatre Volume 3	2003	6, 10, 33, 47, 49, 54, 55, 57, 58, 59, 60, 65, X-Men Special
The Best of Twisted ToyFare Theatre Volume 4	2004	22, 24, 29, 63, 64, 67, 70, 73, 75, 76, 78, 79
The Best of Twisted ToyFare Theatre Volume 5	2005	1, 20, 41, 51, 61, 68, 69, 80, 82, 83, 84, 85
The Best of Twisted ToyFare Theatre Volume 6	2005	38, 62, 74, 88, 91, 92, 93, 94, 95, 97, 98, Daredevil #1 ACE Edition
The Best of Twisted ToyFare Theatre Volume 7	2006	71, 89, 90, 96, 99, 100, 102, 103, 106
The Best of Twisted ToyFare Theatre Volume 8	2007	16, 53, 77, 81, 86, 101, 104, 107, 108, 109, 110, 112
The Best of Twisted ToyFare Theatre Volume 9	2008	56, 113, 114, 116, 117, 118, 119, 120, 122, 124, 127, Avengers #1 ACE Edition
The Best of Twisted ToyFare Theatre Volume 10	2009	50, 111, 121, 123, 125, 126, 128, 130, 131, 132, 133, 134, 135, 137
The Best of Twisted ToyFare Theatre Volume 11	2010	87, 129, 138, 141, 142, 144, 145, 146, 147, 148, 149, 150, 151, 156, 157, 160, 161
Twisted ToyFare Theatre 10th Anniversary Collection		
