= Robot Chicken DC Comics Special =

2012 television film directed by Seth Green

- DVD cover
- Genre: Crossover; Action
- Created by: Seth Green and Matthew Senreich
- Based on: Characters from DC Comics
- Written by: Matthew Beans; Mike Fasolo; Doug Goldstein; Seth Green; Geoff Johns; Breckin Meyer; Tom Root; Matthew Senreich; Kevin Shinick; Zeb Wells
- Directed by: Seth Green
- Starring: Seth Green; Paul Reubens; Neil Patrick Harris; Alfred Molina; Nathan Fillion; Megan Fox; Breckin Meyer
- Narrated by: Kevin Shinick
- Country of origin: United States
- Original language: English

Production
- Production companies: Stoopid Monkey; Stoopid Buddy Stoodios; DC Entertainment; Sony Pictures Television; Warner Bros. Animation; Williams Street

Original release
- Network: Adult Swim
- Release: September 10, 2012

Related
- Robot Chicken: Star Wars Episode III; Robot Chicken DC Comics Special 2: Villains in Paradise

Robot Chicken DC Comics Special is an episode of the television comedy series Robot Chicken and it was aired as a one-off special during Cartoon Network's Adult Swim on September 10, 2012. (Note: Adult Swim lists the special as premiering on September 9, 2012 at 12:00 a.m. (24:00) EST/PST, which is effectively September 10.)

A DC Universe special, in collaboration with DC Entertainment and Warner Bros. Animation. Voice actors are Seth Green, Paul Reubens, Neil Patrick Harris, Alfred Molina, Nathan Fillion, Megan Fox, Breckin Meyer, and Kevin Shinick. The rest of the cast also includes Abraham Benrubi, Alex Borstein, Clare Grant, Tara Strong, Matthew Senreich, Aaron Paul, Steven Tyler, Tom Root, and Zeb Wells. It was followed by Robot Chicken DC Comics Special 2: Villains in Paradise, which premiered April 6, 2014.

== Segments ==
=== RCDC ===
Robot Chicken joins forces with DC Comics superheroes and supervillains.

=== You Can't Fly ===
Superman, Green Lantern, and Wonder Woman have a laugh at Aquaman's expense.

=== That's Bane! ===
While staking out a robbery, Batman has his back broken by Bane.

=== Real Characters from the DC Universe ===
Meet B'dg, a squirrel who's a member of the Green Lantern Corps.

=== The Super Kiss ===
Parody of the scene in Superman II where Superman kisses Lois Lane to make her forget he's Superman. He decides to use his kissnesia on Lex Luthor, Darkseid, Solomon Grundy, Brainiac to make them forget why they hate him. It backfires on him when they show up at the Fortress of Solitude with flowers and candy.

=== Two-Face's OCD ===
Two-Face cannot stop flipping his coin to make decisions, even when he goes to the bathroom. His latest coin flip has him not flushing the toilet, to the dismay of Penguin.

=== Cold Villains ===
Mr. Freeze, Captain Cold, Icicle, and Chillblaine all rob a jewelry auction, causing a problem between the four cold-themed villains. The building collapses due to them inadvertently damaging the walls as Ice is shown outside.

=== Funeral in Earth-C ===
Superman invites Batman and Green Lantern to Captain Carrot's funeral in Earth-C, but Green Lantern cannot help himself from laughing at the other members of the Zoo Crew, causing him to abruptly leave. After Little Cheese comments on Green Lantern's insensitive behavior, Batman begins to snicker at his name.

=== Swamp Thing ===
Swamp Thing tries to get his girlfriend to understand his powers.

=== That's Bane! Again! ===
While recovering in the Batcave, Bane sneaks up on Batman and breaks his back over his knee again.

=== Real Characters from the DC Universe Pt. 2 ===
Meet Firestorm, a "popular" and powerful superhero.

=== Out to Score ===
Batman, Superman, Aquaman, Green Lantern, and Flash hit the bar scene to pick up some ladies. But when Superman and Green Lantern strike out, Aquaman tries to pick up a woman who turns out to be Martian Manhunter in disguise causing him to go home, get drunk and try to have sex with a dolphin.

=== Doom Secret Santa ===
Legion of Doom members Lex Luthor, Captain Cold, Sinestro, and Toyman draw names for Secret Santa as part of a team-building exercise. They make fun of mailroom worker Glenn for his odor, but he is offended and tells them that he is hygienic and only smells due to a gland condition. Glenn later kills himself during the commercial break.

=== Nerd Lantern ===
Instead of Hal Jordan, the Robot Chicken Nerd finds Abin Sur and receives his ring instead. When he is taken to Oa and begins his training with Kilowog, the Guardians begin to doubt if humans are worthy of a power ring. Meanwhile, Abin's corpse is eaten by bears.

=== Luthor's Warsuit ===
Lex Luthor steps into the perfect Superman-killing machine until the scientist's son kicks a ball that hits Lex in the face.

=== That Tickles ===
A criminal shoots Superman, but when he notices the bullets are bouncing off, he fires at his crotch, which continues to deflect the bullets, much to Superman's confusion.

=== The Punctuation Posse ===
After taking a break from the Legion of Doom, Riddler forms the Punctuation Posse which consists of Comma, Quotes, and Exclaimer. However, he is quickly beaten up by the Justice League.

=== That's Bane! Thrice! ===
At the Hall of Justice, Bane sneaks up on Batman and breaks his back over his knee once again while Superman, Wonder Woman, Flash, and Green Lantern watch.

=== Sinestro's Final Moment ===
In the Legion of Doom bathroom, Riddler and Mirror Master tease Sinestro into shaving his mustache. As soon as the razor touches his lip, it starts gushing blood, causing Riddler and Mirror Master to run off in disgust. Text appears stating that Sinestro sustained a near-fatal Staph infection.

=== That Is It ===
Aquaman's had enough of the lack of respect after Superman and Wonder Woman both mock his powers, Robin uses his trident to unclog the toilet, Martian Manhunter cooks his lobster friends, and he slips on a puddle and gets mocked by the other heroes.

=== Real Characters from the DC Universe Pt. 3 ===
Meet Mister Banjo, a supervillain who steals top secret information and plays Morse code about it on his banjo. Suddenly, an enraged Firestorm bursts in and refuses to be in the same category as "Fatty Arbuckle". When Banjo claims that his banjo costs him some money, Firestorm loses his temper, turns the banjo into metal, and uses it to beat up Banjo. When he asks where B'dg is, the narrator quotes "Down the hall. First dressing room to the right". Firestorm heads there and beats up B'dg with the banjo.

=== Aqua Doom ===
Aquaman visits the Legion of Doom HQ and asks to join after getting by Giganta much to the annoyance of Black Manta. At first, they refuse. But when he tells them he has security access codes to the Hall of Justice, they let him on the team.

=== Solomon Grundy ===
Solomon Grundy finds out he was actually born on a Tuesday and that his real name is Solomon Gruesday, much to his anger.

=== Aquaman Appreciation Party ===
Aquaman leads the Legion of Doom into the Hall of Justice in a Trojan cake, where the heroes are revealed to have thrown Aquaman a party. After Aquaman cuts into the cake with Toyman getting stabbed in the process, the Legion of Doom is revealed, leading to an epic final battle between the Justice League and the Legion of Doom.

As Penguin's leg is asleep, Mister Banjo plays his banjo as the Justice League and the Legion of Doom fight in various ways:

- Sinestro fights Green Lantern while mentioning how he got his staph infection and that he almost died. He kicks a ball which hits Lex Luthor during his fight with Martian Manhunter.
- Gorilla Grodd slams Samurai and El Dorado into each other.
- Mirror Master tries to do a mirror trick on Doctor Mid-Nite who punches him.
- Penguin and Captain Cold slam cake into Green Arrow.
- Wonder Woman strangles Black Manta.
- Solomon Grundy kicks Booster Gold as he quotes "See you next Gruesday".
- Robin is kicked by Captain Cold, Chillblaine, Icicle, and Mr. Freeze while still using their cold-related puns.
- Wonder Woman fights Catwoman, Cheetah, and Harley Quinn. Then she punches Penguin in the nose.
- Two-Face flips a coin and punches himself.
- Superman kisses Riddler.
- Darkseid incinerates Wildcat as he asks why he has to fight Darkseid.
- While fighting Batman, Joker shoots urine out of his squirting flower. After Harley Quinn makes a urine pun, Bane sneaks up on Batman again as he quotes "rule of three".
- Cyborg is harassed by the Humping Robot.
- Hawkman punches Brainiac who comments that he cannot concentrate with the banjo noise playing. When Mister Banjo tries to use the gun feature of his banjo, he is punched by Flash.

The fight ends with Superman, Lex Luthor, and Aquaman remaining. Aquaman punches Lex Luthor while Superman is hit by Kryptonite. Later, all the heroes attend Glenn's funeral.

== Voice cast ==
- Abraham Benrubi as Cyborg, Kilowog, Appa Ali Apsa, Solomon Grundy
- Alex Borstein as Wonder Woman, Giganta, Woman at Bar
- Nathan Fillion as Green Lantern, Mr. Freeze
- Megan Fox as Lois Lane
- Clare Grant as Cheetah, Ice, Abby Holland
- Seth Green as The Nerd, Batman, Robin, Aquaman, Penguin, Little Cheese, Martian Manhunter, Toyman, Green Arrow, Scarecrow, Abin Sur, Ganthet, Gorilla Grodd, Hawkman, Jimmy Olsen, various voices
- Neil Patrick Harris as Two-Face, Black Manta
- Breckin Meyer as Superman, Mirror Master
- Alfred Molina as Lex Luthor, Firestorm, Mister Banjo
- Aaron Paul as Glenn, Joker (deleted scene)
- Paul Reubens as Riddler, Deadman (deleted scene)
- Tom Root as Icicle, B'dg
- Kevin Shinick as Narrator, Captain Cold
- Matthew Senreich as The Flash, Brainiac, Wildcat, Chillblaine
- Tara Strong as Harley Quinn, Selena Gomez Construct
- Steven Tyler as Singer
- Zeb Wells as Sinestro, Swamp Thing

== Writers ==
- Matthew Beans
- Mike Fasolo
- Doug Goldstein
- Seth Green
- Geoff Johns
- Breckin Meyer
- Tom Root
- Matthew Senreich
- Kevin Shinick
- Zeb Wells

== Home media ==
Robot Chicken DC Comics Special was released on DVD and Blu-ray, on July 9, 2013.

== Sources and influences ==
The logo for the Robot Chicken DC Comics Special is a modification of that for the Super Powers Collection.

The opening sequence of the special parodies that of the Challenge of the Superfriends albeit with the Legion of Doom substituted with Robot Chicken original characters Chicken, Mad Scientist, Nerd, Humping Robot, Composite Santa, Gummy Bear, the Unicorn, and Bitch Puddin'.

Most of the figures used for the special are from the Mego World's Greatest Superheroes!, Mattel DC Universe Classics, and EMCE Toys/Mattel DC Retro Action Superheroes toylines. Brainiac and Lex Luthor would see both DC Universe Classics and DC Retro Action Superheroes versions (though, of course, the DC Retro Action Superheroes Brainiac figure was an original piece).

The graphic for the "Real Characters from the DC Universe" is similar to the Challenge of the Superfriends title graphic.

The Hall of Justice is from the Super Powers Collection but is white rather than yellow to be in line with its appearance in Super Friends.

The use of Mister Freeze, Captain Cold, Icicle, and Chillblaine as a group of cold-themed villains is an ongoing theme from DC Comics seeing previous versions including a team-up by Captain Cold, Icicle, and Minister Blizzard in Justice League of America #139 (February 1977), the Cold Warriors in Justice League Adventures #12 (December 2002), the Ice Pack in Super Friends #16 (August 2009), and Icicle, Icicle Jr, Mr. Freeze, Captain Cold, and Killer Frost in the Young Justice episode "Terrors".
