= Titan Maximum =

American adult stop motion-animated television series

- Genre: Adult animation; Black comedy; Parody; Mecha
- Created by: Tom Root; Matthew Senreich
- Written by: Tom Root; Zeb Wells
- Story by: Geoff Johns; Tom Root; Matthew Senreich; Zeb Wells
- Directed by: Chris McKay
- Voices of: Rachael Leigh Cook; Eden Espinosa; Seth Green; Breckin Meyer; Dan Milano; Billy Dee Williams; Adrienne Palicki; Tahmoh Penikett; Tom Root; Matthew Senreich; Hugh Davidson; Kurtwood Smith; Zeb Wells; H. Jon Benjamin; Abraham Benrubi; Donald Faison; Ralph Garman; Tom Kane; Edie McClurg; Kevin Shinick; Frank Welker
- Ending theme: "Rising Punch" (performed by Gina Hiraizumi)
- Composer: Shawn Patterson
- Country of origin: United States
- Original language: English
- No. of seasons: 1
- No. of episodes: 9

Production
- Executive producers: Seth Green; Tom Root; Matthew Senreich; Keith Crofford; Mike Lazzo
- Producers: Alex Bulkley; Corey Campodonico; Ollie Green
- Cinematography: Bryan Garver
- Editor: Matt Mariska
- Running time: 11 minutes; 22 minutes (Pilot only)
- Production companies: ShadowMachine; Titmouse, Inc; Stoop!d Monkey; Tom Is Awesome; Williams Street

Original release
- Network: Adult Swim
- Release: September 27 – November 22, 2009

Titan Maximum is an American adult stop motion-animated television series created by Tom Root and Matthew Senreich for Cartoon Network's late night programing block Adult Swim. It originally aired from September 27 to November 22, 2009. A teaser premiered during the "Robot Chicken on Wheels" tour and at the 2009 San Diego Comic-Con. It is a parody of the "Super Robot" anime style produced using stop motion animation.

== Plot ==
Drafted from the Solar System's best and brightest young people, Titan Force Five once defended the capital of Saturn's moon Titan by using the heavily armed Mecha Titan Maximum. However, the team was disbanded due to budget cuts after a series of escalating incidents caused by Titan Force Five.

Two years later, after the team members have long separated and gone to ground in civilian jobs (one of them, Spud, has even died in an accident), their former teammate Gibbs returns as a villain who wants to conquer the Solar System with an army of monsters.

The three remaining Titan Force Five members have to reform the team to stop him. Along for the ride are Palmer's younger brother Willie (a nerdy mechanical genius) and Leon (their silent monkey janitor), who take on the former roles of Gibbs and Spud, respectively.

== Characters ==
=== Titan Force Five ===
- Commander Palmer (voiced by Breckin Meyer) – The red teammate and leader of the group, Palmer is a narcissist who sees himself as the best member of the team. His ego irritates anyone close to him, particularly Gibbs, who describes Palmer as "an egomaniacal troglodyte who will let you all die a fiery hell before he shares even one iota of glory." Palmer never takes anything seriously, even in the face of danger, however has shown to be worried when a teammate is in trouble (like when the people of Eris tried to rape his brother or when Jodi was being arrested for treason). He is always referred to by his last name, even by close family like his brother and grandparents. Since the original team disbanded, he has lived off his prior fame and accomplishments while drinking heavily and bar hopping. He eagerly retakes his role as leader of Titan Force Five when Gibbs emerges as a villain. He has a younger brother, Willie, and takes every opportunity to demean him, but regardless does care for his well-being. He has a habit of starting a fight with the saying, "You have something in your teeth... my fist!", followed by a slight awkward pause then an attack that isn't a punch. Gibbs describes his fighting style as doing nothing but "hitting the A button". Ironically, despite Gibbs hatred towards Palmer, Palmer always thought of Gibbs as a friend back when they were a team; however, Palmer left him when he got captured because Palmer was trying to get to his date. Few months later, Palmer didn't even know Gibbs was gone. His ship forms the head and torso of Titan Maximum.
- Lt. Jodi Yanarella (voiced by Rachael Leigh Cook) – The quintessential "girl next door", Jodi is the bright, cheerful member of the team, reflecting her position as the yellow teammate. She is skilled in martial arts, works in many charities, and always tries to maintain a positive attitude. She's the only teammate that takes her job seriously. However, this falters around Sasha, who takes every opportunity to mock her; Jodi often finds herself incapable of gaining the upper hand in their bickering. Being the most intelligent member of the team, she finds satisfaction in being proven right while her teammates jump to conclusions. She had a previous relationship with Gibbs, who often refers to her as "Jo Jo", but Gibbs broke up with her before switching sides, later claiming it was to protect her. Her ship forms the right arm, even though in-story it is unheard of for a girl to pilot the right arm because of the constant so-called "training" a guy does with said arm.
- Lt. Junior Grade Sasha Caylo (voiced by Eden Espinosa) – The stuck-up sex symbol of the group, "tabloid harlot" Sasha is the black-suited member of the team. After the team disbanded, she took up singing, despite having a terrible singing voice (which others constantly remind her of). Unabashedly promiscuous, Sasha goes to clubs every night to drink and sleep with men, sometimes ending up so out of it that she cannot remember what day it is. Palmer boasts that "Sasha can find the genitals on anything that breathes" (something she is shown to be proud of). This boast comes in the form of attacking monsters in the groin, a strategy she believes is the best and only course of action. Troy commented that she "replaced her soul with a vacuous need for fame and penises." She has a rivalry with Jodi, insulting her any chance she gets as well as prone to blame her for anything that goes wrong, always saying "look what you did, Jodi." She is very emotional, prone to outbursts for the slightest reason, such as striking a reporter over the head with a bottle for an insult, whom she then saves from a falling sign. She is the most emotional in her reaction to Gibbs' turning to evil, going into a long, angry rant filled with obscenities that Palmer eventually mutes halfway through. Her father is the president of Titan, her excesses being her way of rebelling against him. She has also shown a sadistic side, such as repeatedly shooting a man in the knee and then stepping on it afterward, all while laughing maniacally. Sasha's ship forms the left arm, though she is sometimes seen controlling the right, as well.
- Space Seaman Willie Palmer (voiced by Dan Milano) – Willie is Palmer's younger brother, and a huge fan of Titan Maximum. Excited with the idea of being part of the team, he takes up the role of the blue team member when the team gets in trouble. Though he has played the Titan Force simulator hundreds of times, his application in handling the actual ship is poor at best, though he seems to have improved after his initial attempt. He deeply wanted the glory just like his brother. He has an ego just like his brother, but no one takes him seriously. He has a massive crush on Sasha, thinking he has a chance with her. He has a degree in robotics engineering from DeVry, which his brother mocks, and he is able to repair the Titan Force Five ships in an hour. He was also able to reassemble the damaged robot on a 10 million Zurich budget, despite the original costing about fifty times that amount, as well as making them better than they were before in only a two-week time frame (except for the face, which he didn't have time for, though later fixes). Willie constantly tries to win his brother's approval, in spite of Palmer's equally constant mockery. Willie is too blind to see through his brother and Sasha. He once ends up being kissed by a boy, whom Willie thinks is a girl. People often mistake him for a girl, and people call him Leon, or he is called a monkey. His ship forms the right leg.
- Leon – The silent monkey janitor of Titan Force Five, Leon becomes the green team member when it becomes apparent that the remaining three Titan Force members cannot win by themselves. He is a graduate of the military Primate Training Academy, which turns out trained monkeys to work for free in positions that humans won't do or are clearly suicidal. The ever-stoic Leon never reacts to anything said to him, the only sign that he's even paying attention being a single blink or a turn of the head. Despite his seemingly emotionless expressions, he has a non-verbal wit as shown in the pilot, where he is shown to have traced "Wash Me" and "Leon Rules" on the dirty windows of the Titan ships. He helps Willie in repairing Titan Maximum, and Sasha frequently mistakes the two for one another. His ship forms the left leg.
- Chief Petty Officer "Spud" Cunningham (voiced by Tom Root) – Spud was the original green team member and the "drug-fueled heart" or "lovable goofball" of the group. While his skills as a pilot and a warrior were lackluster, his friendly, lovable nature kept the team together despite their constant bickering, although it seems that he may have just sided by Palmer and Sasha in their antics. Some time after the disbanding, Spud died in what would be seen as a controversial death: after purchasing a large quantity of cocaine and a prostitute's services for a "Balcony Party," he fell off the exceedingly tall balcony to his death at age 27, the entire 50 second fall filmed by a camcorder he was using to film the party.

=== Titan ===
- Admiral Chester Bitchface (voiced by Billy Dee Williams) – Admiral Bitchface, age 66, is an official of the Titan military service, and comes from a line of Bitchface military officers. He is responsible for the original team's disbandment, wanting to save funds during peacetime and because of his own personal loathing for the Titan Force Five's antics in the past. Though he refused to rebuild Titan Maximum at first, Bitchface is forced to comply by the President due to the Titan Force Five getting the people's support and Gibbs (whom he assumed to be an idiot just like the rest of Titan Force Five. Bitchface underestimates Lt. Gibbs). having the platoon Bitchface sent after him systematically slaughtered. However, he manages to embezzle 490 million of the 500 million Zurich fund for his own attempt to stop Gibbs, Project Colostomy, forming a collaboration with Hammerschmiddtt Motors to create Titan Megamum. Eventually, when Jodi's sex tape is made public, Bitchface gets a suitable reason to disband the team for good and replace Titan Maximum with Titan Megamum (though he does not realize that Troy has joined forces with Lt. Gibbs).
- President Keith Caylo (voiced by Dan Milano) – Keith Caylo is the President of Titan and Sasha's father, which explains why she is able to get away with all she does and still be a member of Titan Force Five, even though he wishes she would give up being a member of Titan Force Five and get a real job. He has a hidden disdain toward his daughter for her selfishness and lewd behavior, usually having to suppress a strong anger just at the mere mention of her name. However, he nevertheless comes to his daughter's defense when someone speaks ill of her.

=== Mars ===
- Martian Prime Minister (voiced by Seth Green) – The unnamed prime minister of Mars. He seems to cave easily under pressure, and is more than willing to defy the Mars Constitution to ensure survival. President Caylo refers to him as a "Martian Windbag".
- Mr. Hammerschmiddtt (voiced by Hugh Davidson) – A savvy business man who runs Hammerschmiddtt Motors, and one of the more powerful men on Mars. He and his company are collaborating with Bitchface on Project Colostomy and sees Gibbs attack as finally bringing Mars and Titan together, to defeat him. He has a habit of using the metaphor "whipping that (something) like an uppity rent boy!", something Troy constantly reminds him to stop doing.
- Tiffany Hammerschmiddtt – Troy's younger sister, a silent and bookish looking young woman who will take over Hammerschmiddtt Motors. Her glasses have a habit of coming loose quite easily.

=== Mercury ===
- Jodi's Grandmother (voiced by Edie McClurg) – She is affectionately referred to as "Gammy" by her granddaughter. When Jodi confesses to her grandma about the many mistakes that she made in her life, Gammy is very supportive and proud of her granddaughter and promised to support her no matter what. But when Jodi's affair with Gibbs is made public, she promptly declares "You're dead to me" and walks off much to the dismay of the already emotionally shattered girl.
- Palmer & Willie's Grandparents – Referred to by Willie and Palmer as "Mamo and Bampo", they share the general hysteria when it comes to their elder grandson, and more often than not overlook Willie.
- Gibbs' Grandmother – A grouchy, bitter old woman who never stops complaining, particularly over her grandson's complete lack of communication with her. Nevertheless, she allows Gibbs to use her house as a hideout. She has a habit of smacking Claire in the head with a wooden spoon, believing children should be "seen and not heard", and while it is suggested she did the same thing to Gibbs as a child, he instructs Claire not to kill her.
- Leon's Grandparents – Both have a very similar attitude to Leon's, and they're both very protective of their grandson's innocence. They appear to be Christian, having a monkey-themed rendition of the Last Supper on their wall (Leon likewise reaches out to a monkey Jesus in the episode "Tip of the Iceberg").
- Mercury General (voiced by Kurtwood Smith) – An unnamed general of Mercury's military who approves of Admiral Bitchface's Titan Megamum project. He also tells Admiral Bitchface that if it breaks anything, he is paying for it.

=== Antagonists ===
- Lt. Gibson "Gibbs" Giberstein (voiced by Seth Green) – Gibbs was the original blue team member and second in command. Gibbs, being the brains of the group, resented being overshadowed by Palmer, who hogged all the glory. He also has a general hatred towards the team, such as Jodi and Sasha's constant bickering and Spud's carefree attitude. It would be Palmer's betrayal of Gibbs, prior to the group being disbanded (Palmer purposely stranded Gibbs in space, in order to attend a party he wanted to go to), that would cause him to denounce good and become a villain. After the group disbanded shortly after Gibbs reunited with his teammates (none of which cared that Palmer had abandoned him), Gibbs disappeared and began his evil scheming to conquer the solar system, ultimately losing his eye in an unrevealed incident. During a TV interview, he announces his plan to conquer the solar system, crush anyone who opposes him, and name himself "Super King Big Nuts". He had past relations with teammate Jodi, and constantly flirts with her in spite of Sasha claiming that he ended it. He has many habits: saying "MOOOOOOOO!" to get his teammates' attention, stating personal actions for no reason ("Time to take a dump!"), excessively giving the finger when mocking his adversaries to the point that he will press buttons with it, and mixes his insults with flirting. He also has a running gag of when he takes a dramatic pose, he is hit in the balls (usually by Palmer). He is extremely intelligent, and is usually able to achieve his goals by tricking Titan Force Five in some way, while his minion or monster may be defeated, he always achieves his true goal.
- Claire (voiced by Adrianne Palicki) – Claire is a dwarf girl who looks to be 8 years old rather than her natural age of 21. In spite of her appearance and cheery personality, Claire is actually a sadistic superhuman and the solar system's greatest assassin, able to climb walls and move at blinding speeds. She wields an aggregated diamond nanorod sword larger than her body, which she can pull from thin air. When Bitchface sends a squad to take Gibbs into custody, Claire kills them all single-handedly. However, Claire, on Gibbs' order, reluctantly refrains from killing Gibbs' grandmother while on Mercury, despite his grandmother's habit of whacking her in the head with a wooden spoon. Though she acts like a little girl, she hates being treated as such. Claire has pink hair with two Pigtails coming up from her head, resembling insect antennae. She seems to like frogs, having a backpack and hair clips with the image of a frog on them (Gibbs also refers to her as his "little frog"). Claire proves to be a better fighter than both Jodi and Sasha, until they decide to work together and fight dirty, eventually punting her into the energy beam for the solar shield, presumably killing her but because of her super human abilities, her current status is unknown.
- Troy Hammerschmiddtt (voiced by Tahmoh Penikett) – An ace pilot in the Mars military who used to fight Titan during the war between the two planets. Though he is the son of a wealthy industrialist, his father states that "he has the business acumen of a squirrel", so his sister is taking over the business while he "will be too busy french kissing adventure itself". He seems to have a love/hate relationship with Sasha, clearly seen while they were dancing romantically while insulting each other the entire time. Though neither one admits it through their rivalry, Troy is basically a male version of Sasha: an arrogant, sex-craving pilot who has lived a pampered life as the child of a powerful man, the only difference being that his father is proud of his child's career in the military. He is the pilot for Titan Megamum, a joint Mars/Titan program funded by Bitchface. He is secretly in league with Gibbs giving him Megamum in return for gaining control of Hammerschmiddtt Motors. Despite his earlier claim, he is upset by his father passing the mantle to his sister after he has risked life and limb piloting every invention his father made. Claire hospitalizes Troy to make it appear as if Titan Megamum was stolen, allowing him to appear innocent and earning him several medals for his "attempt" to stop Gibbs much to Sasha's annoyance.

== Mecha ==
- Titan Maximum – The team's Super Robot. It is composed of the Titan Force Five ships. A Titan serviceman remarks that prior to Jodi, "No girl has ever been the right arm of Titan Maximum before", implying that Titan Maximum has been in service for some time before its current crew. Titan Maximum's usual method of attack is to "punch the fuck" out of whatever they happen to be fighting, which is known as the "Titan Power Punch". It also has a blaster (which is lost on Neptune) and a net (which proved useless). It is destroyed by the first giant robot monster Gibbs sent to Titan, then rebuilt by Willie. He didn't have time to finish the face before Gibbs' next attack, making a bus load of students wonder if it was the "mentally handicapped cousin" of Titan Maximum, but finishes it by the following episode. It has a breakfast nook in what appears to be its chest, something Sasha was unaware of. It is severely damaged when Titan Force Five enters one of Mercury's solar shield generators in an attempt to stop Gibbs from carrying out his master plan.
- Titan Megamum – The replacement for Titan Maximum, funded by Bitchface and built by Hammerschmiddtt Motors, making it Martian in origin. Though Mars is prohibited from constructing war machines, Bitchface and Hammerschmiddtt exploited a loophole that allowed Megamum to be built for Titan. The Titan Maximum crew themselves point out that "Megamum" isn't a real word. Unlike Titan Maximum, Titan Megamum only requires a single pilot, using what appears to be a Wii Remote. The robot is highly advanced and heavily armed, including a large rifle and numerous laser weapons along the shoulders and in its eyes. Megamum is able to withstand extreme temperatures and has a crotch shield to block Sasha's trademark attack. It also has command codes to Titan Maximum, but Willie scrambled the codes after the first time this was exploited.

== Key planets ==
In the future setting of Titan Maximum, most of the solar system has been colonized and its planets and moons terraformed to support life.

- Mercury – The planet has since become a massive retirement planet, protected by a planet wide solar shield. Travel to Mercury is restricted for people not in their golden years (Gibbs states the median age of the planet is 85), unless they are there to visit relatives, in which case they are legally required to see them. Because of this rule, Mercury's military is made up entirely of elderly folk.
- Earth – Earth's fate in this future has not been explained in detail, only the vague statement that it has experienced "troubles".
- Mars – Like Titan, the planet Mars has been colonized. In the backstory of the series, there was a war between Mars and Titan which eventually ended with the formation of a treaty two years prior to the current day. Part of the treaty prohibits Mars from building weapons, which would seem to imply that they lost the war. Despite the two having entered peace and working together, the two sides still clearly hold some animosity for each other.
- Saturn
  - Titan – Titan is one of the moons of Saturn and is the home planet of Titan Force Five. It is shown to have a developed urban environment. It is apparently an independent democracy with its own navy and military.
  - Erriapus – Irregular moon of Saturn, where one of Gibbs' secret bunker-lairs is located.
  - Dione – The sixteenth moon of Saturn, converted into a romantic getaway complete with a surreal forest and a massive, heart-shaped lake. Jodi goes there to get away from her team, where she reminisces about her previous relationship with Gibbs before confronting him again.
- Neptune – The eighth planet from the Sun. it has been colonized as a vacation spot with the only real industry being the Neptunian Steam Farm.
- Eris – Could be considered the stereotypical "deep south" of the solar system, located farthest from the centers of civilization. As the air scrubbers couldn't overpower the methane in the air, the entire planet stinks and no women will settle there, resulting in a population of nothing but inbred rednecks. Titan Force Five finds proof of alien life here while tracing a signal emitted by Gibbs' robots, but accidentally destroys it in a fire fight with the locals.

== Episodes ==
Each episode is eleven minutes long, with the exception of the 30-minute pilot.

No.	Title	Directed by	Written by	Original release date
1	"Pilot"	Chris McKay	Tom Root	September 27, 2009
After the Titan Maximum team is disbanded due to lack of funds, one of the members goes rogue and attacks the capital city on Saturn's moon of Titan with a robotic lava monster. Titan Force Five, restaffed by Leon the monkey janitor and Palmer's little brother Willie, fights the monster, successfully defeating it at the cost of their robot.
2	"Busted"	Chris McKay	Tom Root	October 4, 2009
Titan Force rallies a gigantic mob to demand that Titan Maximum be repaired after being denied by Admiral Bitchface and President Keith Caylo. After a failed attempt to take out Gibbs with his own team, Admiral Bitchface embezzles almost all the funds allocated to Titan Maximum and allows them to rebuild on a meager $10 million.
3	"Tip of the Iceberg"	Chris McKay	Tom Root and Zeb Wells	October 11, 2009
Titan Maximum battles a vicious ice monster on the planet Neptune. Gibbs uses the distraction to steal a one-of-a-kind insulated coil from the local steam factory.
4	"Went to Party; Got Crabs"	Chris McKay	Zeb Wells	October 18, 2009
Gibbs uses a giant robotic crab monster to hold the leaders of both Titan and Mars hostage at the annual Peace Feast on Io, bartering their lives for the codes to a Martian weapon of mass destruction. Titan Maximum battles the crab, but the prime minister gives up the codes before they can stop it.
5	"To Eris, Human!"	Chris McKay	Tom Root	October 25, 2009
Jodi has an encounter with Gibbs while taking a break from her teammates, and the rest of the team discovers an alien spaceship on Eris while investigating a signal associated with Gibbs' robotic monsters.
6	"Dirty Lansbury"	Chris McKay	Tom Root and Zeb Wells	November 1, 2009
After her encounter with Gibbs, Jodi suggests that he might be hiding on Mercury, the retirement home planet. As a result, Titan Force Five has to spend time with their grandparents (except Sasha, whose grandparents are supposedly dead) to be admitted. Guest Star: Abraham Benrubi as Drill Instructor
7	"Megamum Overdrive"	Chris McKay	Zeb Wells	November 8, 2009
When Gibbs releases a tape of him and Jodi having sex, Titan Force Five is disbanded and Jodi is arrested for treason. Meanwhile, Troy Hammerschmiddtt shows up in Titan Maximum's replacement: Titan Megamum. However, he is secretly in league with Gibbs.
8	"Mercury Falling"	Chris McKay	Tom Root	November 15, 2009
Gibbs takes Titan Megamum, intending to use the robot in his plan to destroy Mercury's solar shield and roast every living thing on the planet as a warning to anyone who might cross him. Titan Force Five goes AWOL to stop him.
9	"One Billion Dead Grandparents"	Chris McKay	Tom Root and Zeb Wells	November 22, 2009
Titan Force Five fights with Gibbs and Claire in order to determine the fate of Mercury. Note: This cliffhanger episode was originally supposed to serve as the season finale with the conclusion revealed in episode one of season two, unfortunately Adult Swim cancelled the series shortly after this episode aired and so the fate of Titan Force Five remains up in the air.

== International broadcast ==
In Canada, Titan Maximum previously aired on G4's Adult Digital Distraction block, and currently airs on the Canadian version of Adult Swim.

== Home media ==
DVD name	Release date	No. of episodes	Features
Titan Maximum Season 1	August 10, 2010	9	Audio commentaries, Behind the scenes, Deleted animatics, Anatomy of a sequence, Crew mugshots, Table read, Trailers, Design showcase, and Pop-up trivia
