= Tom Root =

American actor and television producer

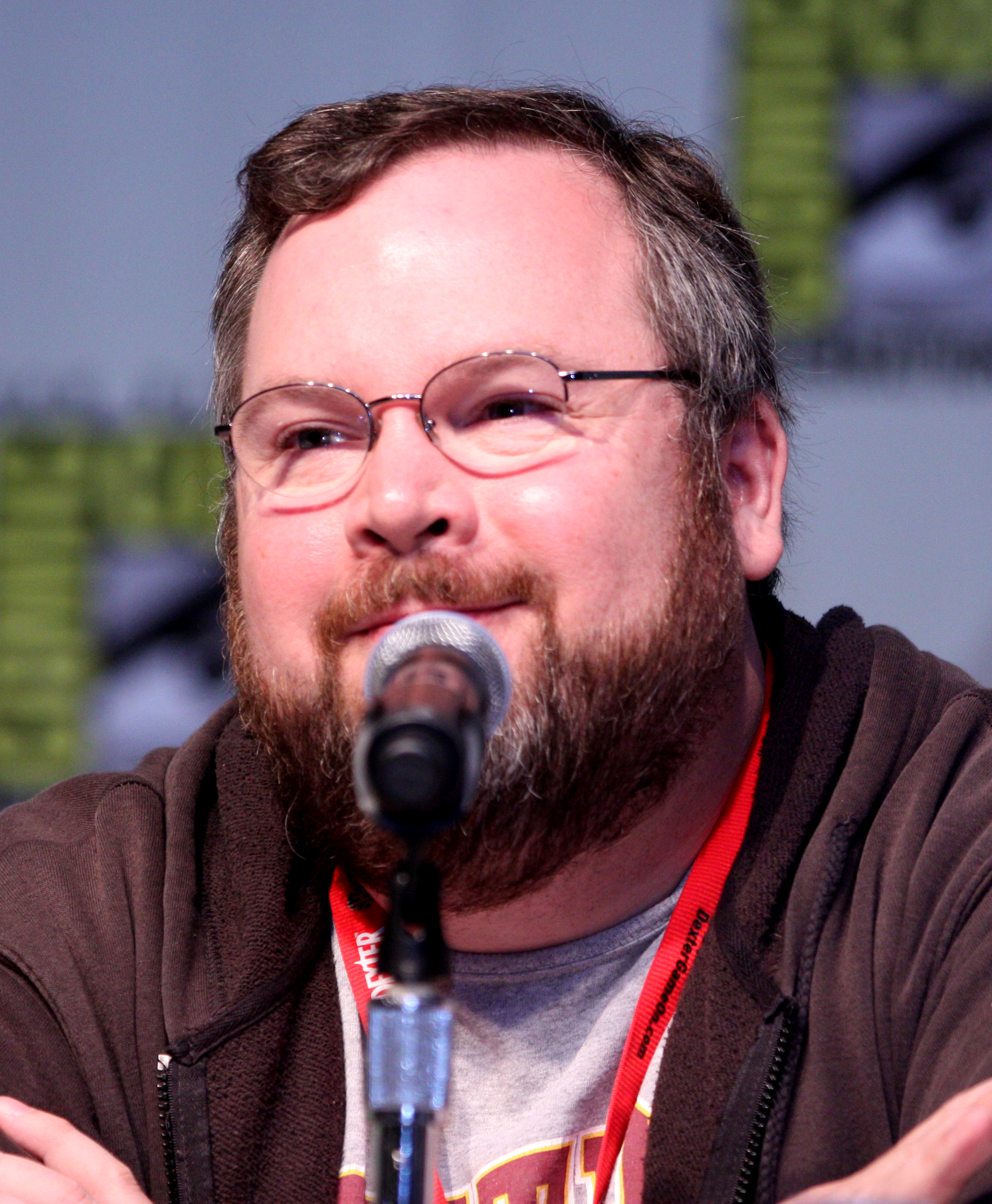
- Root at the 2010 San Diego Comic-Con
- Born: Thomas R. Root; September 20, 1973 (age 52); Iowa City, Iowa, U.S.
- Education: Central Michigan University
- Occupations: Writer; producer; television director; voice actor
- Years active: 2005–present

Thomas R. Root (born September 20, 1973) is an American writer, producer, director and voice actor known for his work on Robot Chicken.

== Early life ==
Root was born in Iowa City, Iowa. He attended Central Michigan University, graduating with a degree in journalism. While at CMU, Root edited the student newspaper CM Life.

== Career ==
Root was one of the original staffers of ToyFare magazine, and was a staff writer and copy editor for Wizard Entertainment's family of publications. While at ToyFare, he was a co-writer of the magazine's 's popular Twisted ToyFare Theatre feature.

Root co-wrote Writers on Comics Scriptwriting, vol. 2, with Andrew Kardon in 2004. He also wrote Archie Comics' 200th issue of Jughead in 2010.

Root and Robot Chicken co-creator Matthew Senreich created the Adult Swim series Titan Maximum which premiered on September 27, 2009. He was a writer on Lucasfilm's animated series Star Wars Detours. Root also wrote The Simpsons' Robot Chicken-style animated opening in 2013.

== Filmography ==
Tom Root's production company is called Tom is Awesome and produces many television shows, seen in the table below.

Year	Title	Contribution				Role	Notes
Year	Title	Writer	Producer	Actor	Director	Role	Notes
2005–2020	Robot Chicken	{X}		{X}	{X}	Various voices	Head writer (145 episodes); Writer (15 episodes); Actor (91 episodes); Director (7 episodes)
2007	Robot Chicken: Star Wars	{X}	{X}				TV short (Head writer, co-producer)
2008	Robot Chicken: Star Wars Episode II	{X}	{X}				TV short (Head writer, co-producer)
2009	Titan Maximum	{X}	{X}	{X}		"Spud" Cunningham / Cadet #2	Creator (6 episodes); Story (9 episodes); Writer (4 episodes); Executive producer (9 episodes); Actor (2 episodes)
2009–2010	Hot Wheels Battle Force 5	{X}					Writer (2 episodes)
2010	Robot Chicken: Star Wars III	{X}	{X}				Television film (Head writer and co-executive producer)
2011–2020	Robot Chicken		{X}				Executive producer (91 episodes, 2011–2020); Co-producer (79 episodes, 2005–09); Co-executive producer (6 episodes, 2010–11); Consulting producer (1 episode, 2018)
2012	Robot Chicken: DC Comics Special	{X}		{X}		Icicle, B'dg	TV short
2013	Übermasion			{X}		Brad	TV short
2013–17	The Simpsons	{X}	{X}				Executive producer (2 episodes) — "The Fabulous Faker Boy" (2013) — "The Cad and the Hat" (2017) (also writer)
2014	Robot Chicken DC Comics Special 2: Villains in Paradise	{X}	{X}				TV short (Head writer, executive producer)
2015	Robot Chicken DC Comics Special III: Magical Friendship	{X}					TV short (Head writer)
2015–19	SuperMansion	{X}	{X}	{X}		Brad, Buster Nut	Executive producer (44 episodes); Writer (3 episodes)
2017	American Dad!			{X}		Townsperson, Fan	3 episodes
2020–2021	Crossing Swords	{X}	{X}				Creator (10 episodes); Writer (3 episodes); Executive producer (1 episode)
2020	Stargirl		{X}				Consulting producer (13 episodes)
2020	Star Wars: The Clone Wars			{X}		Manage (Voice Role)	— "Together Again"
