= Robot Chicken: Star Wars Episode II =

- DVD cover
- Genre: Crossover; Sci-fi; Action
- Created by: Seth Green; Matthew Senreich
- Based on: Star Wars by George Lucas
- Written by: Seth Green; Breckin Meyer; Hugh Davidson; Mike Fasolo; Douglas Goldstein; Dan Milano; Tom Root; Matthew Senreich; Kevin Shinick; Zeb Wells
- Directed by: Seth Green
- Starring: Seth Green; Abraham Benrubi; Bob Bergen; Ahmed Best; Rachael Leigh Cook; Hugh Davidson; Donald Faison; Keith Ferguson; Carrie Fisher; Seth MacFarlane; Breckin Meyer; Dan Milano; Conan O'Brien; Adrianne Palicki; Andy Richter; Amy Smart; Zeb Wells; Billy Dee Williams
- Theme music composer: Les Claypool
- Country of origin: United States

Production
- Production companies: Lucasfilm; Sony Pictures Digital; Stoopid Monkey; ShadowMachine Films

Original release
- Network: Adult Swim
- Release: November 16, 2008

Related
- Robot Chicken: Star Wars; Robot Chicken: Star Wars Episode III

"Robot Chicken: Star Wars Episode II" is a 2008 episode of the television comedy series Robot Chicken, and the sequel to the Annie Award winning "Robot Chicken: Star Wars", which aired as a one-off special during Cartoon Network's Adult Swim block on November 16, 2008. Like "Robot Chicken: Star Wars", it has been released on its own DVD on July 21, 2009, and will not be part of a season box set. The DVD contains the original broadcast version, and the "Extended Version", which features an additional 15 minutes of footage cut from the broadcast version. It was nominated for a 2009 Primetime Emmy Award for Outstanding Animated Program (for Programming Less Than One Hour).

== Synopsis ==
"Robot Chicken: Star Wars Episode II" is a 22-minute-long special episode of Robot Chicken

=== List of Skits in the Broadcast Version ===
1. In the middle of the Ewoks' celebration of the second Death Star's destruction, Boba Fett returns from the Sarlacc pit alive and well, then slaughters numerous Ewoks using his laser blasters, lightsabers, and a missile from his jetpack before Princess Leia arrives, does a striptease which leaves Leia in her slave outfit and then proceeds to make Boba grope her. In the end, all is revealed to be the fantasy of Robot Chicken's own Nerd.
2. Opening sequence, redone from the previous special "Robot Chicken: Star Wars", based on the end sequences of Star Wars: Episode III – Revenge of the Sith but modified from the original (the condition of the Death Star in the background is that of the half-constructed version seen in Return of the Jedi). The Mad Scientist (as Emperor Palpatine) saves the Robot Chicken (as Darth Vader) from the volcanic planet Mustafar and rebuilds it before forcing it to watch the show.
3. Palpatine pays a visit to his Ithorian barber Alfonso for a haircut, who eventually suggests the idea of hiring a bounty hunter to capture the crew of the Millennium Falcon instead of relying on Darth Vader.
4. Parody of the Geonosian arena scene from Star Wars: Episode II – Attack of the Clones, as an over-the-top commercial for a monster truck event.
5. Princess Leia scolds Luke Skywalker for missing Ben Kenobi, whom he met the day before, while her entire family and home planet have been destroyed.
6. After his wife insists he do so, Gary the Stormtrooper brings his daughter Jessica to work, which includes the assault on Tantive IV during the opening sequence of Star Wars Episode IV: A New Hope. Gary and Jessica are later on Tatooine, encountering Obi-Wan Kenobi in a parody of the "These Are Not The Droids You Are Looking For" scene where Gary shouts at his daughter when she tries to tell him the droids are the ones they're looking for, frustratedly explaining that he couldn't think with the temperatures being too high. Jessica runs off sobbing, and Gary chases after. A fellow Stormtrooper remarks, "See? That's why I don't take my daughter to jack sh*t."
7. The interrogator droid from the Death Star refuses to torture Leia. It becomes a parody of medical drama shows where "Dr. Ball" points out medical inadequacies from the movies.
8. A jingle for "Admiral Ackbar's Fish Sticks" is pitched by Figrin D'an, but gets rejected. One of the other Modal Nodes suggests that it's better as an instrumental.
9. A stormtrooper mourns the loss of a fellow trooper killed by Princess Leia.
10. A mouse is shown piloting a "mouse droid" and flees in fright from Chewbacca.
11. Parody of the scene from Revenge of the Sith where Anakin Skywalker kills the younglings in the Jedi temple. Anakin deals with the trauma of killing children by imagining he's on planet Naboo and the children are sunflowers — which later gives Padmé a fright when he brings her a bouquet of "fresh cut sunflowers".
12. Two AT-ATs have a race during the Battle of Hoth.
13. In perhaps the only oceanic part of Tatooine, a Krayt Dragon gives a dramatic speech about how planets made up of only one topographic feature (like Hoth [ice], Endor's Forest Moon [forest], and Mustafar [lava]) are ridiculous, and departs to explore the rest of the planet. A week later, C-3PO walks past the dragon's skeleton in the desert.
14. Continuation of the third scene where Palpatine goes to his barber. In a parody of the "What is thy bidding" scene from The Empire Strikes Back, Palpatine criticizes (and belittles) Darth Vader and then puts an ad out for bounty hunters.
15. Parody of GEICO commercials using Jar Jar Binks to explain car insurance. At the end, the customer comments that her explanation makes more sense than Jar Jar's babblings.
16. Continuation from the fourteenth scene, parodying the bounty hunter scene from The Empire Strikes Back.
17. Lando Calrissian comments on the name of Boba Fett's ship, Slave I.
18. Recycled skit from "Moesha Poppins" where Han Solo, Chewbacca and Princess Leia have an awkward meal with Boba Fett, Lando Calrissian and Darth Vader.
19. Ad for Bob Goldstein, an attorney who specializes in suing Jedi and any cases involving missing limbs. Among his clients are a Wampa, Ponda Baba and Darth Maul.
20. Parody of a scene from The Empire Strikes Back, where Han Solo hears an unexpected confession from Chewbacca before he is frozen in carbonite.
21. Parody of the scene from The Empire Strikes Back where Darth Vader says the line, "I am altering the deal, pray I don't alter it any further", in which he continually alters the deal as soon as Lando Calrissian voices a complaint, to make him do such embarrassing things, such as wearing a dress and bonnet, riding a unicycle, wearing clown shoes and referring to himself as "Mary".
22. Parody of the scene from The Empire Strikes Back where Luke Skywalker refuses Darth Vader's offer to join the dark side; in this version, Luke imagines what a father/son relationship with Darth Vader would be like, complete with fishing, learning to ride a bike, teaching Luke how to shave, and a father/son break dance contest against Jango and Boba Fett. He accepts the offer but trips on his way back to Vader and falls anyway.
23. A couple looking to buy an apartment in Cloud City. Their interaction with the apartment's "features" causes Luke's further perils after his fall in the previous scene.
24. Mon Mothma orders the calamari at a restaurant, much to the umbrage of Admiral Ackbar, who is a Mon Calamari.
25. The aftermath of Boba Fett being swallowed by the Sarlacc. In order to preserve his reputation, he withholds the truth from a Weequay captive that his dropping in here was the result of an accident, claiming that he defeated 67 Jedi and killed Han Solo plus Luke Skywalker before jumping into the Sarlacc.
26. Palpatine has an awful day. First, the tray-table on the shuttle broke spilling his coffee and burning his groin in the process. Then, the Death Star's spaceport loses his luggage, forcing him to buy novelty clothing at a gift shop; then, it turns out that his throne is directly beneath an air vent and only views the blackness of space and lastly, one hour later, a frustrated Darth Vader throws him down a reactor vent.
27. End credits - Chickens "bawk" the Star Wars theme.
28. After the credits - Two Imperial officers discuss the state of the Empire after the second Death Star's destruction. Even though they still have a vast arsenal of weapons and starships and many legions of stormtroopers, the Rebels still win because they destroyed the Death Star and killed Palpatine at the same time. The Imperial Officers then decide to go get massages.

=== List of Skits in the Extended Version ===
1. Parody of the introductionary opening crawl from A New Hope, where the narrative writing quickly becomes much too informal.
2. Anakin returns to the Lars homestead with the body of his mother. Padmé, Owen and Beru start laughing when they call him "Little Orphan Ani." In a follow-up skit, just before Owen and Beru are killed in A New Hope, the stormtrooper says they may now laugh at the joke before they are burned alive.
3. A Tusken Raider flees a bar when the bartender comes up behind him. Obi-Wan tells the bartender that they startle easily, but will return in greater numbers (much to the barman's pleasure).
4. R2-D2's shutting down of the Death Star's garbage compactors poses a problem to Darth Vader when he attempts to get rid of his dinner leftovers via the kitchen sink.
5. When Princess Leia names Dantooine as the main Rebel base to Governor Tarkin, Vader immediately orders the Death Star crew to fire upon the planet, forgetting in his excitement that Tarkin's house is located there.
6. During the honoring ceremony following the first Death Star's destruction, Han and Luke react with indignation at the less-than-flattering inscriptions on their medals.
7. When Han and Luke return to the Rebel base on Hoth, two Tauntauns are outraged to hear about the fate of their fellow Maurice.
8. When the Rebel fighter fleet masses for an attack, a new prototype fighter - a "Q-Wing" - goes completely out of control due to the inconvenient placement of its main thruster.
9. General Grievous, working as a car washer, is forced to make use of his additional arms to get the job done.
10. Admiral Ackbar, participating in a quiz show, fails to find the very word which would become part of his most famous quote.
11. A scene casting a somber view on Greedo's abandoned home while the rest of the galaxy is as yet unaware of his death.
12. During his training on Dagobah, Luke's acrobatic achievements make Yoda - whom he carries on his back - go spectacularly sick.
13. Zuckuss and 4-LOM respond to Vader's ad for able bounty hunters.
14. Before joining the bounty hunter meeting, Dengar asks Bossk what recent bounty hunter adventures he had. Bossk thinks back to him fighting some adversaries in a similar fashion to the opening scene of Indiana Jones and the Temple of Doom; but then replies, "Nothing much".
15. Bib Fortuna blow-dries his head-tails.
16. After the Millennium Falcon evades the Imperial Fleet by floating amongst a Star Destroyer's garbage, Dengar prepares to pursue them, boasting about his "sneaky" toilet seat-shaped ship before it is smashed to pieces by a stray asteroid.
17. When the Ugnaughts of Bespin's junk disposal unit taunt Chewbacca by throwing around C-3PO's head, one of them - a failed football player - once again misses his chance to keep a hold on the prize.
18. An extension to the "Moesha Poppins" skit, in which IG-88 waits in the wrong dining room to capture Han, Leia and Chewbacca.
19. During the clone troopers' assault on the Geonosian arena, one of the soldiers expresses his concern about Yoda's peculiar speech pattern.
20. A mock commercial about "My Little Tauntaun" dolls.
21. A parody of a final scene from Revenge of the Sith, where Palpatine is depicted as an innocent-appearing but naughty child who taunts his pet cat, "Mr. Whiskers" (Vader), over the loss of his "squeaky toy".
22. When Lando Calrissian and Chewbacca prepare to depart for their quest for Han, Chewbacca complains unintelligibly about Lando acting as Han's replacement - right down to his clothes and aftershave.
23. When Obi-Wan Kenobi's Force ghost relays Darth Vader's full story to Luke, he and Yoda also explain about the technicalities of truth within the film trilogy's continuity in the form of a musical performance.
24. Parody of the scene from Return of the Jedi where Luke removes Darth Vader's helmet; as the Death Star crew evacuates, one of the crew members pauses to take a picture of Vader with a camera phone.
25. The Ewoks are killed by falling debris from the destruction of the second Death Star.
26. A post-credit scene showcasing numerous outtakes from the Boba Fett in the Pit of Sarlacc sequence, where Fett is constantly spoiling his performance.

== Cast ==
- Seth Green as Obi-Wan Kenobi, Anakin Skywalker, Nerd, Ponda Baba, Bob Goldstein, various voices
- Seth MacFarlane as Emperor Palpatine, Dr. Ball, Figrin D'an
- Breckin Meyer as Boba Fett, Admiral Ackbar, Wampa
- Abraham Benrubi as Darth Vader
- Bob Bergen as Luke Skywalker
- Ahmed Best as Jar Jar Binks
- Hugh Davidson as Alfonso, Stormtrooper, Rebel Trooper
- Keith Ferguson as Han Solo, General Veers
- Conan O'Brien as Zuckuss
- Adrianne Palicki as Padmé Amidala, Jessica
- Carrie Fisher as Princess Leia, Mon Mothma, Female Krayt Dragon
- Billy Dee Williams as Lando Calrissian, Ackbar's Manager
- Donald Faison as Gary the Stormtrooper, Darth Maul, Star Wars nerd
- Andy Richter as Male Krayt Dragon, 4LOM
- Zeb Wells as Dengar, Imperial Officer

== Writers ==
- Seth Green
- Breckin Meyer
- Hugh Davidson
- Mike Fasolo
- Douglas Goldstein
- Dan Milano
- Tom Root
- Matthew Senreich
- Kevin Shinick
- Zeb Wells

== DVD release ==
"Robot Chicken: Star Wars Episode II" was released on DVD on July 21, 2009. The DVD contains the original broadcast version, and the "Extended Version", which features an additional 15 minutes of footage cut from the broadcast version, along with many bonus features.

== Sequel ==
Robot Chicken: Star Wars Episode III was shown on December 19, 2010.
