= Ahmed Best =

American actor (born 1973)

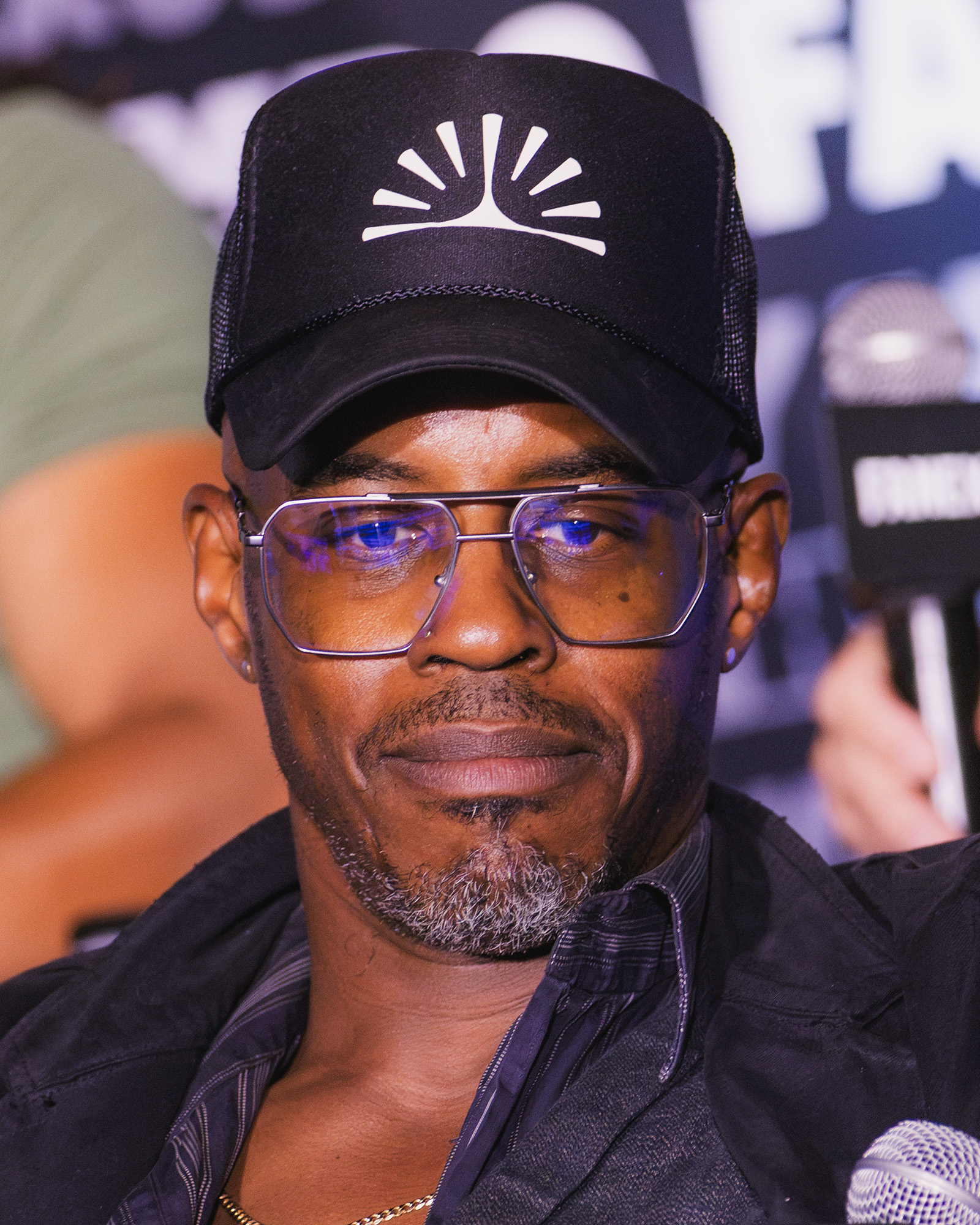
- Best in 2026
- Born: August 19, 1973 (age 53); New York City, U.S.
- Education: Manhattan School of Music
- Occupations: Actor; comedian; musician
- Years active: 1989–present
- Spouse: Raquel Horsford

Ahmed Best (born August 19, 1973) is an American actor, comedian and musician. He is known for providing the voice and motion capture for the character Jar Jar Binks in the Star Wars franchise.

Best likewise collaborated with director George Lucas in three films and seven episodes of the animated show Star Wars: The Clone Wars. He won the Annie Award for Voice Acting in an Animated Television Production for portraying Jar Jar Binks in Robot Chicken: Star Wars Episode II. He also voices Roux, a powerful mythical being in the video game South of Midnight.

== Early life ==
Ahmed Best was born in New York City on August 19, 1973. Born in Roosevelt Hospital, he lived the majority of his formative years in the Soundview section of the Bronx. Best and his family moved to Maplewood, New Jersey, in 1984. He attended Columbia High School, graduating in 1991. He then studied percussion at the Manhattan School of Music.

== Career ==
=== 1994–1995: Early work ===
In 1994, Best joined the acid jazz group the Jazzhole and was a member for two years. He co-wrote and co-produced three albums for the group, including The Jazzhole, And the Feeling Goes Around, and The Beat is the Bomb. In 1995, he co-wrote and co-produced Escape by Bill Evans.

In 1995, he joined Stomp. He toured with the cast throughout the US and Europe.

=== Star Wars ===
==== 1997–2014: Star Wars prequel trilogy and The Clone Wars ====
In 1997, after casting director Robin Gurland had observed his flexible, athletic movements in Stomp, Ahmed was cast as Jar Jar Binks in the Star Wars prequel trilogy (1999–2005). His first audition for George Lucas "was a motion-capture session." He wore a full body suit on set during principal photography and originally, it was planned to only animate his character's head. His choreographed body movements provided 'reference points for the digital artists at ILM.' Lucas asked him to voice Jar Jar. Best described his character as, "A loyal, honest, innocent character who really means well." His involvement on the production is featured in the 2001 documentary The Beginning: Making Star Wars Episode I.

Best reprised the role in the Robot Chicken specials Robot Chicken: Star Wars and Robot Chicken: Star Wars Episode II, Star Wars: The Clone Wars, and an episode of The Colbert Report. Best also portrayed an Outlander Club patron, Achk Med-Beq in Star Wars Episode II: Attack of the Clones. C-3PO actor Anthony Daniels (Note: Daniels also made a cameo as Lieutenant Dannl Faytonni (in the same scene Achk Med-Beq appeared in) in Attack of the Clones. According to Daniels, both Med-Beq and Faytonni were a criminal partnership. Faytonni appeared in Revenge of the Sith but Med-Beq did not.) told Best "that they were going to let [him] reveal [his] face" in the film so Best decided to take part in the scene. His character can be seen in the Outlander Club on Coruscant when Anakin Skywalker and Obi-Wan Kenobi pursue the changeling assassin Zam Wesell.

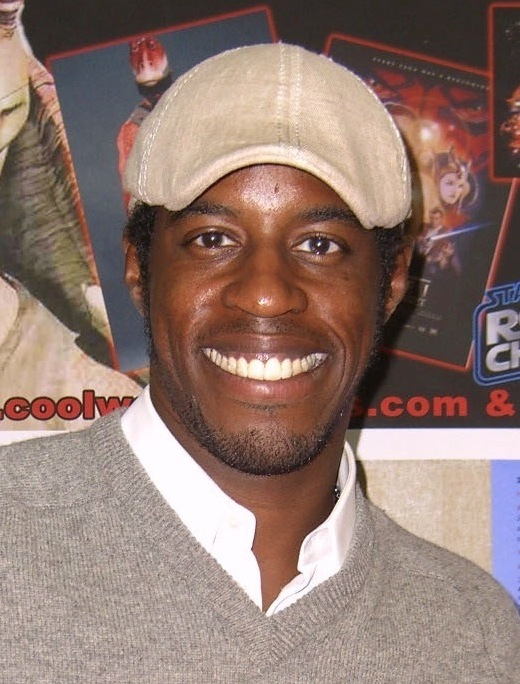
Best in 2010

Initially, Star Wars Episode I: The Phantom Menace received mixed reviews, but it became the highest-grossing film of 1999 and nominally the highest-grossing Star Wars film at the time of its release. Best said he put a lot of himself into the character, so when Jar Jar drew hostility from audiences, it sometimes extended toward the actor, or he otherwise interpreted it personally. Best reprised his role in the following two films rounding up the prequel trilogy but appeared in few scenes. The character of Jar Jar Binks was so disliked that Best considered suicide. This evoked support from fans and some of the cast, including Frank Oz and Star Wars: The Last Jedi film director, Rian Johnson. Oz said, "I just will never understand the harshness of people's dislike of [Jar Jar Binks]. I do character work. He is a GREAT character!" Johnson tweeted, "Lots of love to you Ahmed. I think there are many of us who'd get quite a lot from hearing your story."

==== 2019: Reappraisal ====
Following a reappraisal of the prequel trilogy, Anthony Daniels said in his memoirs that "the years have been kinder to this, the first Prequel. Many, who were young at the time, still hold it, and Jar Jar Binks as their dearest memory of the Saga." Daniels praised Best for his "quick-witted humour" during the first Star Wars Celebration held at Denver, Colorado, a few weeks before the release of The Phantom Menace. A lot of the cast (including Liam Neeson) and crew defended Best. Neeson, who was aware of the criticism Best faced, praised him for his humour and talent. He said that Best "was probably one of the funniest guys and talented guys I have ever worked with." Jake Lloyd who also faced criticism over his performance also praised Best for his humour, saying, "He is one of the coolest guys that I've ever met." Daniels personally defended Best, praising him for his intelligence and energy and saying that the criticism he faced "was beyond cruel."

In 2019, as part of the 20th anniversary, Best cited the audience for which The Phantom Menace was aimed reaching adulthood and their perspective on the film as some of the reasons for the reappraisal of the prequel trilogy. He said, "the prequels, that's theirs, and they defend the prequels. So I see the same thing. I see the resurgence of The Phantom Menace." Initially, Best was hesitant about attending Star Wars Celebration Chicago in 2019 due to the criticism and spending "most of [his] time defending" the film and his character. However, he was moved by the warm welcome he received from the crowd during the Star Wars Show Live and The Phantom Menace 20th anniversary panel - as well as positive reception and the newfound appreciation for the film. Lucas named Jar Jar as his favourite character and praised Best, saying, "Ahmed, you did a fantastic job. It was very, very hard."

Best appeared with fellow Star Wars alumni Dee Bradley Baker, James Arnold Taylor, and Daran Norris on the TV show Big Time Rush. He also appeared in the second season of the documentary television series Light & Magic and talked about the significance of his character (being Lucasfilm's first CGI character), the experience making The Phantom Menace, as well as the criticism he faced following the film's release.

==== 2020–present: return to Star Wars franchise ====
"I love the mythology of Star Wars more than anything else. I love that I got to be a Jedi Master rather than me, because Ahmed Best is not a part of the Star Wars galaxy. The suspension of disbelief doesn't happen for the kids if Ahmed Best is the host."

— Best talking about Jedi Master Kelleran Beq to Star Wars Insider

In late May 2020, Lucasfilm announced that Best would star as Jedi Master Kelleran Beq in the game show Star Wars: Jedi Temple Challenge, which premiered in June 2020. (Note: Attributed to multiple references:) Best reprised the role of Beq in the third season of The Mandalorian, a live-action series set in the Star Wars universe. His character rescued Grogu from Darth Sidious's Jedi Purge and acted as his protector preceding the Mandalorian. (Note: The Mandalorian is set five years after the events of Return of the Jedi, though Grogu's flashback of the Jedi Purge takes place concurrently with the events of Revenge of the Sith.)

Dave Filoni said, "We love Ahmed, and he did such a great job. It was a real thrill for us to get him involved." Filoni and Jon Favreau said that there is a possibility that Best could appear as Kelleran Beq again. Best confirmed that Kelleran Beq is related to Achk Med-Beq. In 2023, when discussing the possibility of playing Jar Jar again, Best said, “I would never say never. I don't feel like Jar Jar's story was ever closed”. He has expressed an interest in exploring Kelleran Beq further and doing "a Star Wars martial arts show".

Best voiced Darth Jar Jar, a Sith Lord version of his character in Lego Star Wars: Rebuild the Galaxy (2024–2025). He reprised this role in the video game Fortnite Battle Royale.

Best has attended several conventions as part of Star Wars Celebration as a guest since 1999. He attended Star Wars Celebration Japan in April 2025.

In October 2025, an upcoming Marvel Comics title, Jar Jar Binks, was announced at New York Comic Con. Best and Guggenheim wrote the issue published on 11 February 2026 which featured Best's characters, Jar Jar Binks and Kelleran Beq. The one-shot comic explored "the consequences Binks faced after giving Chancellor Palpatine emergency powers" as depicted in Attack of the Clones. Best will attend Star Wars Celebration Los Angeles in 2027.

== Other work ==
In addition to his acting roles, Best has worked as an adjunct professor at Stanford University. His Stanford classes have touched on subjects such as art and Afrofuturism.

In 2008, he wrote, directed, and produced the pilot for a television show called This Can't Be My Life.

== Filmography ==
=== Film ===
| Year | Title | Role | Note | Ref. |
|---|---|---|---|---|
| 1989 | Lean on Me | Extra | | |
| 1999 | Star Wars: Episode I – The Phantom Menace | Jar Jar Binks | Voice and motion capture | |
| 2002 | Friendly Criminal | Himself | Short film | |
| 2002 | Star Wars: Episode II – Attack of the Clones | Jar Jar Binks and Achk Med-Beq | Voice and cameo | |
| 2002 | Armitage: Dual Matrix | Mouse | Voice; English version | |
| 2003 | The Stockholm Syndrome | Himself | Short film | |
| 2003 | There's a Sucker Born Every Minute | Nathan | Short film | |
| 2004 | Kangaroo Jack: G'Day U.S.A.! | Louis Booker | Voice | |
| 2005 | Escorched | Richard Prentiss | Short film | |
| 2005 | Star Wars: Episode III – Revenge of the Sith | Jar Jar Binks | Voice | |
| 2006 | Open Window | Rufus | | |
| 2007 | Charlie's Bitch Ass Hos | Makeafoolofme West | Short film | |
| 2009 | Mother and Child | Julian | | |
| 2010 | The Pink House | Actor Judge | | |
| 2010 | 2001 Maniacs: Field of Screams | Crow | | |
| 2011 | Poolboy: Drowning Out The Fury | Sidney Moncrief | | |
| 2011 | Some Guy Who Kills People | Mayor Maxwell | | |
| 2012 | FDR: American Badass! | Curtis | | |
| 2013 | DJ | Mouse (Armitage segments) | | |
| 2013 | W.M.D. | News Reporter | | |

=== Television ===
| Year | Title | Role | Note |
|---|---|---|---|
| 2003 | Alias | Seth | Episode: "A Free Agent" |
| 2006 | The Colbert Report | Jar Jar Binks (voice) | Episode: "George Lucas" |
| 2007 | Robot Chicken: Star Wars | Jar Jar Binks, AT-AT Driver (voice) | Television film |
| 2007 | The DL Chronicles | —N/a | Episodes: Wes & Robert (executive producer); Boo & Mark (co-executive producer) |
| 2008 | This Can't Be My Life | Ahmed | Episode: "The Pink Pages"; also composer, co-producer, writer, and director |
| 2008 | Robot Chicken: Star Wars Episode II | Jar Jar Binks, Stormtrooper (voice) | Television film Annie Award for Best Voice Acting in an Animated Television Production or Short Form |
| 2008 | 5 Second Movies | Himself | |
| 2008–14 | Star Wars: The Clone Wars | Jar Jar Binks, Lyonie (voice) | 7 episodes |
| 2009 | Cougar Town | Dwayne | Episode: "Mystery Man" |
| 2009–12 | Big Time Rush | Marketer, Rob | 3 episodes |
| 2010 | Robot Chicken: Star Wars Episode III | Jar Jar Binks, Carl the Stormtrooper (voice) | Television film |
| 2011 | Law & Order: LA | Dell Gregory | Episode: "Runyon Canyon" |
| 2011 | Zeke and Luther | Sal Sackelson | Episode: "Bro'd Trip" |
| 2011 | In the Flow with Affion Crockett | Black Jock | |
| 2012 | Lego Star Wars: The Empire Strikes Out | Jar Jar Binks (voice) | Television short |
| 2020 | Star Wars: Jedi Temple Challenge | Jedi Master Kelleran Beq | |
| 2020 | The George Lucas Talk Show | Himself | Episode: "Best in Show" |
| 2023 | The Mandalorian | Kelleran Beq | Episode: "Chapter 20: The Foundling" |
| 2024 | Lego Star Wars: Rebuild the Galaxy | Darth Jar Jar Binks (voice) | |
| 2025 | Krapopolis | Gargie the Giant (voice) | 2 episodes |

=== Documentary ===
| Year | Title | Role | Note |
|---|---|---|---|
| 1999 | From Star Wars to Star Wars: The Story of Industrial Magic | Himself | |
| 2001 | The Beginning: Making Star Wars Episode I | Himself | |
| 2001 | R2-D2: Beneath the Dome | Himself | Uncredited |
| 2005 | Science of Star Wars | Himself | |
| 2009 | Black to the Future | Himself | |
| 2010 | The Life of Bob Marley | Bob Marley | |
| 2010 | 2001 Maniacs: Behind the Screams | Himself | |
| 2025 | Light & Magic | Himself | |

=== Music ===
| Year | Title | Songs |
|---|---|---|
| 2010 | 2001 Maniacs: Field of Screams | "The South's Gonna Rise Again" "Rot in Hell" "Hey Hey Howdy Howdy Hey" "Fun, Games and Feastin'" "Building From the Ground Up" |

=== Video games ===
| Year | Title | Role | Note | Ref. |
|---|---|---|---|---|
| 1999 | Star Wars: Yoda's Challenge Activity Center | Jar Jar Binks | Voice | |
| 1999 | Star Wars Episode I: The Phantom Menace | Jar Jar Binks | Voice | |
| 1999 | Star Wars: The Gungan Frontier | Jar Jar Binks | Voice | |
| 2000 | Star Wars Episode I: Jedi Power Battles | Jar Jar Binks | Voice | |
| 2000 | Star Wars: Early Learning Activity Center | Jar Jar Binks | Voice | |
| 2000 | Star Wars: Jar Jar's Journey Adventure Book | Jar Jar Binks | Voice | |
| 2001 | Star Wars: Galactic Battlegrounds | Jar Jar Binks | Voice | |
| 2001 | Star Wars: Super Bombad Racing | Jar Jar Binks | Voice | |
| 2005 | Lego Star Wars: The Video Game | Jar Jar Binks | Uncredited | |
| 2007 | Lego Star Wars: The Complete Saga | Jar Jar Binks | Uncredited | |
| 2009 | Marvel: Ultimate Alliance 2 | Cloak | Voice | |
| 2011 | Lego Star Wars III: The Clone Wars | Jar Jar Binks | Voice | |
| 2015 | Disney Infinity 3.0 | Jar Jar Binks | Voice | |
| 2020 | Fallout 76: Wastelanders | Carver Timmerman, James Addison, Jide | Voice DLC | |
| 2020 | The Last of Us Part II | Additional voices | | |
| 2025 | South of Midnight | Performance and voice director | | |
| 2025 | Fortnite Battle Royale | Darth Jar Jar | | |

=== Theatre ===
| Year | Title | Role | Note |
|---|---|---|---|
| 1995 | Stomp | Sarge | Winner of Obie Award |
| 1997 | The Tempest | Lead | |
| 2002 | Uncle Tom's Cabin | Lead | |
| 2002 | Jack | Sammy | |
| 2003 | Vacuums | J. Buttersworth III | |

== Discography ==
| Song | Note |
|---|---|
| "The Jazzhole" | Co-wrote and co-produced |
| "And the Feeling Goes Around" | Co-wrote and co-produced |
| "The Beat is the Bomb" | Co-wrote and co-produced |
| "Secret" | |
| "Falling Apart" | |
| "Take Time" | |
| "Mean What You Say" | |
| "Sweet Child" | |
| "I Wonder" | |
| "Is It Worth" | |
| "Dear James" | |
| "It's the Jazz" | On the album Vitality of Expression by Jeff Peretz |
| "Forms of the Rhythm" | On the album Vitality of Expression by Jeff Peretz |
| Celebrity EP | as DJ Starfaker |
