= ToyFare =

Monthly Wizard Entertainment magazine

- Cover of ToyFare #80 (Feb. 2004) featuring Teen Titans action figures
- Frequency: Monthly
- Founded: 1997
- Final issue: 2011
- Company: Wizard Entertainment
- Country: United States
- Based in: New York City, New York
- Language: English

ToyFare was a monthly magazine published by Wizard Entertainment that focused on collectible action figures, busts, statues, and maquettes. It previewed new and upcoming lines and figures each month, as well as providing a price guide for toy lines, both new and old. ToyFare was also known for its satirical humor.

== Publication history ==
The magazine began publication in 1997, initially borrowing many features which first appeared in its sister magazine, Wizard. It maintained a steady monthly schedule, reaching its 100th issue in December 2005. ToyFare featured alternative covers, first with issue #20, and subsequently was used with almost every issue after #57.

Along with its sister publication, Wizard, ToyFare ceased publication on January 24, 2011. The final issue published was #163.

=== Twisted ToyFare Theatre ===
The most popular feature in ToyFare was Twisted ToyFare Theatre (TTT), a humorous comic strip done by photographing toys on sets built by the magazine's staff (this technique was likewise used for covers for much of the magazine's earlier run). The strips predominantly featured action figures produced by the Mego Corporation, toys popular in the 1970s, during the childhoods of much of the magazine's staff. Most of the regular figures/characters featured in the strip were Marvel Comics characters, such as Spider-Man (popularly known as "Mego Spidey") and the Incredible Hulk. Twisted ToyFare Theatre's popularity was such that Wizard Entertainment released several trade paperback collections of the strips.

=== The Monthly Rag ===
The magazine added "The Monthly Rag", a feature similar to supermarket tabloids, presenting parody articles using various toy and pop culture references. (An example would be an article reporting on the intelligent design debate on the planet Cybertron, home of the robotic Transformers). Originally, this feature's main articles were humorous exaggerations of actual toy-related stories (such as news of the He-Man and the Masters of the Universe series' release on DVD, reported as "Shocking He-Man Footage Made Public!"), and a sidebar column would appear somewhere within the "Monthly Rag" section with short summaries of the real news behind the exaggerated articles.

== Regular features ==
- Monthly horoscopes with ridiculous or nonsensical predictions, supposedly written by Cobra Command hypnotist/interregator Crystal Ball (billed as "psychic to the famous toys").
- An advice column headed by a fictional character who, because of a specific situation or certain quirks in their personality, gives advice that ranges from useless to extremist to outright non-sequiturs. An example would be "Ask Anakin Skywalker, Burning in Lava" (a reference to the character's horrific fate at the end of Star Wars: Episode III – Revenge of the Sith); all of Skywalker's responses were non-sequiturs, primarily cries of pain and lamentations about his fall from grace.
- A classified section featuring ads supposedly placed by various fictional celebrities, such as movie or TV characters and superheroes.
- The "Page Sixteen Girl", a photo on said page of a "sexually appealing" female action figure, a parody of the Page Three Girl, a feature originating in the Rupert Murdoch-owned United Kingdom tabloid The Sun.
- Parodies of comic strips, primarily drawn by Ryan Dunlavey, usually placing toy or other pop culture characters in the roles of an established comic strip, such as "Cringerfield", which placed the feline character Cringer from the Masters of the Universe mythos into a setting similar to that of the comic strip character Garfield (with He-Man in the role of Jon Arbuckle).

== Connection to Robot Chicken ==
Several former ToyFare staffers, such as Doug Goldstein, Tom Root, and Matthew Senreich, went on to help create the Adult Swim program Robot Chicken with actor Seth Green, whose humor is in the same vein as Twisted ToyFare Theatre.
