= Robot Chicken: Star Wars =

- DVD cover
- Genre: Crossover; Sci-fi; Action
- Created by: Seth Green; Matthew Senreich
- Based on: Star Wars by George Lucas
- Written by: Jordan Allen-Dutton; Mike Fasolo; Doug Goldstein; Seth Green; Charles Horn; Breckin Meyer; Tom Root; Matthew Senreich; Hugh Sterbakov; Erik Weiner
- Directed by: Seth Green
- Starring: Seth Green; Candace Bailey; Abraham Benrubi; Bob Bergen; Ahmed Best; Donald Faison; Joey Fatone; Keith Ferguson; Mark Hamill; Hulk Hogan; Tom Kane; George Lucas; Seth MacFarlane; Malcolm McDowell; Breckin Meyer; Dan Milano; Chad Morgan; Conan O'Brien; Robert Smigel; Adam Talbott; James Van Der Beek
- Theme music composer: Les Claypool
- Composers: Charles Fernandez; Adam Sandborne; Michael Suby
- Country of origin: United States of America
- Original language: English

Production
- Executive producers: Seth Green; Matthew Senreich
- Producers: Alex Bulkley; Corey Campodonico
- Cinematography: Jeff Gardner; Bryan Garver
- Editor: Chris McKay
- Running time: 30 minutes
- Production companies: Lucasfilm; Sony Pictures Digital; Stoopid Monkey; ShadowMachine Films

Original release
- Network: Adult Swim
- Release: June 17, 2007

Related
- Robot Chicken: Star Wars Episode II

"Robot Chicken: Star Wars" (also known as "Robot Chicken: Star Wars Episode I") is a 2007 episode of the television comedy series Robot Chicken, airing as a one-off special during Cartoon Network's Adult Swim block on June 17, 2007 (released after the original Star Wars film's 30th anniversary). It was released on DVD on July 22, 2008.

== Synopsis ==
The 22-minute episode's sketches all relate to Star Wars.

=== Chapter 1 ===
1. Opening sequence – based on the end sequences of Star Wars: Episode III – Revenge of the Sith, the Mad Scientist (as Palpatine) saves Robot Chicken (RC) (as Anakin Skywalker) from the volcanic planet Mustafar and rebuilds him as Darth Vader before forcing it to watch Robot Chicken.
2. An AT-AT pilot sits on the toilet during the battle at the beginning of The Empire Strikes Back, as Luke Skywalker throws a grenade into the bathroom.
3. Palpatine gets a collect call from Vader who tells him that the Rebel Alliance blew up the Death Star, leaving Palpatine in financial turmoil. This skit is recycled from the episode "1987," although the voice of Darth Vader heard on Palpatine's phone has been redone from the original.
4. A Jawa orders a "Martini!" at the cantina.
5. A janitor sweeps up the corpse of Darth Maul on Naboo, exclaiming that he's "gotta get that transfer to Coruscant".
6. An advert for Admiral Ackbar's breakfast cereal.
7. Ponda Baba is shown to be an architect. He goes with Evazan to the cantina at lunch and there asks Luke Skywalker a question (in non-human tongue). A drunken Evazan convinces Luke that this is actually a threat, and despite Ponda's friendly intentions, Obi-Wan Kenobi slices his arm off. He returns to work, but is laid off as the chopped-off appendage was his drawing arm.

=== Chapter 2 ===
1. C-3PO sets off the metal detector going through an airport-like security screening and assumes that it's his keys.
2. Qui-Gon Jinn accidentally drops his lightsaber on the Trade Federation ship; it slashes its way through the decks below.
3. Vader's meditation chamber attempts to put his helmet on, but accidentally lifts him up.
4. An Imperial officer explains to some new recruits that Vader does not actually have the power of Force strangulation, but that they should pretend to die anyway, so that Vader does not kill them with his lightsaber.
5. After destroying the Death Star, Luke asks R2-D2 to call his aunt and uncle, before remembering that they are dead, and R2 was damaged during the fight.
6. George Lucas attends a Star Wars convention and attempts to escape with a nerd dressed as a Tauntaun. After running into an army of fans, the nerd gives Lucas a "ride" to the speech platform on his back – which he later describes as the "greatest day of my entire life".
7. Luke complains that with the blast shield down on his helmet, during his first lesson in using the Force, he cannot see. Obi-Wan takes advantage of this and knees him in the groin.
8. A space slug, after failing to catch the Millennium Falcon, discusses ordering Chinese food as an alternative with his space slug neighbor.
9. The janitor sweeps up the corpse of Mace Windu on Coruscant, now claiming that he's "gotta get the transfer to the Death Star".
10. After discovering he is a Jedi, George W. Bush convinces Laura Bush to have a threesome with Condoleezza Rice, throws Bill Clinton's car into a pond at McDonald's, and defaces the Lincoln Memorial, before dueling with Abraham Lincoln. Then, in a parody of the scene between Luke and Vader in The Empire Strikes Back, Bush accidentally cuts off Jenna Bush's middle finger. Bush awakens from his daydream, revealing that he does not actually have Jedi powers. This skit is recycled from the episode "Massage Chair".

=== Chapter 3 ===
1. A weather report reveals that Cloud City is currently "cloudy, followed by clouds".
2. Han Solo cuts open his Tauntaun, to use its warmth to keep Luke alive, only to find it already occupied by a drunken homeless man.
3. Luke has a "Yo Mamma" fight against Palpatine. Palpatine loses and Vader throws him down the energy shaft as seen in Return of the Jedi.
4. The janitor sweeps away Palpatine's corpse on the second Death Star, this time exclaiming "Oh, come on! What are they doing up there all the time?"
5. During the attempt to rescue Princess Leia, Han attempts to prevent any stormtroopers being sent to the prisoner control room by telling an Imperial officer that there is a reactor leak. The officer is skeptical, who eventually calls Vader, who decides that installing a reactor there would be a good idea.
6. Jar Jar Binks meets up with Anakin Skywalker after the prequel trilogy, although remains largely oblivious to the fact that he is now Darth Vader. Annoyed, Vader ejects him from an airlock. Later, however, as Vader prepares to sleep, he is woken up by Jar Jar, who has returned as a Force ghost.
7. Luke enjoys the Tosche Station strippers called "The Power Converters". This implies the "true" motive behind Luke's claim to Uncle Owen, "But I have to go to Tosche Station to pick up some power converters" in A New Hope.
8. Boba Fett walks up to a carbonite-frozen Han Solo and begins to gloat at his superiority, which slowly turns into Fett coming on to the frozen Solo.
9. Chewbacca goes to comb his hair, in a parody of Fonzie from the opening credits of Happy Days.
10. In order to win Luke to the dark side of the Force, Darth Vader reveals many spoilers about Star Wars. These include that Vader is Luke's father, Leia is his sister, that the Empire will eventually be defeated by Ewoks and that C-3PO was built by Anakin himself. This sketch is recycled from the episode "Vegetable Funfest", and is the only part of the special where Luke is voiced by Mark Hamill.
11. As Palpatine tries to give an impassioned speech, he is continually interrupted by the ongoing construction of the second Death Star. This skit was partially inspired by a conversation in the movie Clerks regarding private contractors and construction workers on the Death Star II.

=== Chapter 4 ===
1. Lobot dances around the Cloud City corridors to an excerpt of the song Star Wars Theme/Cantina Band by Meco.
2. A posthumous advertisement of "Max Rebo's Greatest Hits", which includes a list of "hits" which mostly stress that while he looks like one, he is not actually an elephant. This sketch includes a vocal cameo by 'N Sync's Joey Fatone.
3. Mid-Night with Zuckuss - A parody of Late Night with Conan O'Brien (with the real-life O'Brien voicing Zuckuss), with guests including a Syncro-Vox Emperor Palpatine and "Darth Vader". The filming studio is visited and destroyed by the Death Star.
4. Luke and Leia are shown in the aftermath of an incestuous night.
5. The Empire on Ice! - An "On Ice" musical version of The Empire Strikes Back.
6. End credits – The chickens "bawk" the Star Wars credits music.
7. Following the credits, there is a continuation of the "Vader and Jar Jar Reunion" sketch, where the ghost of Jar Jar is still annoying Vader.

== Voice cast ==
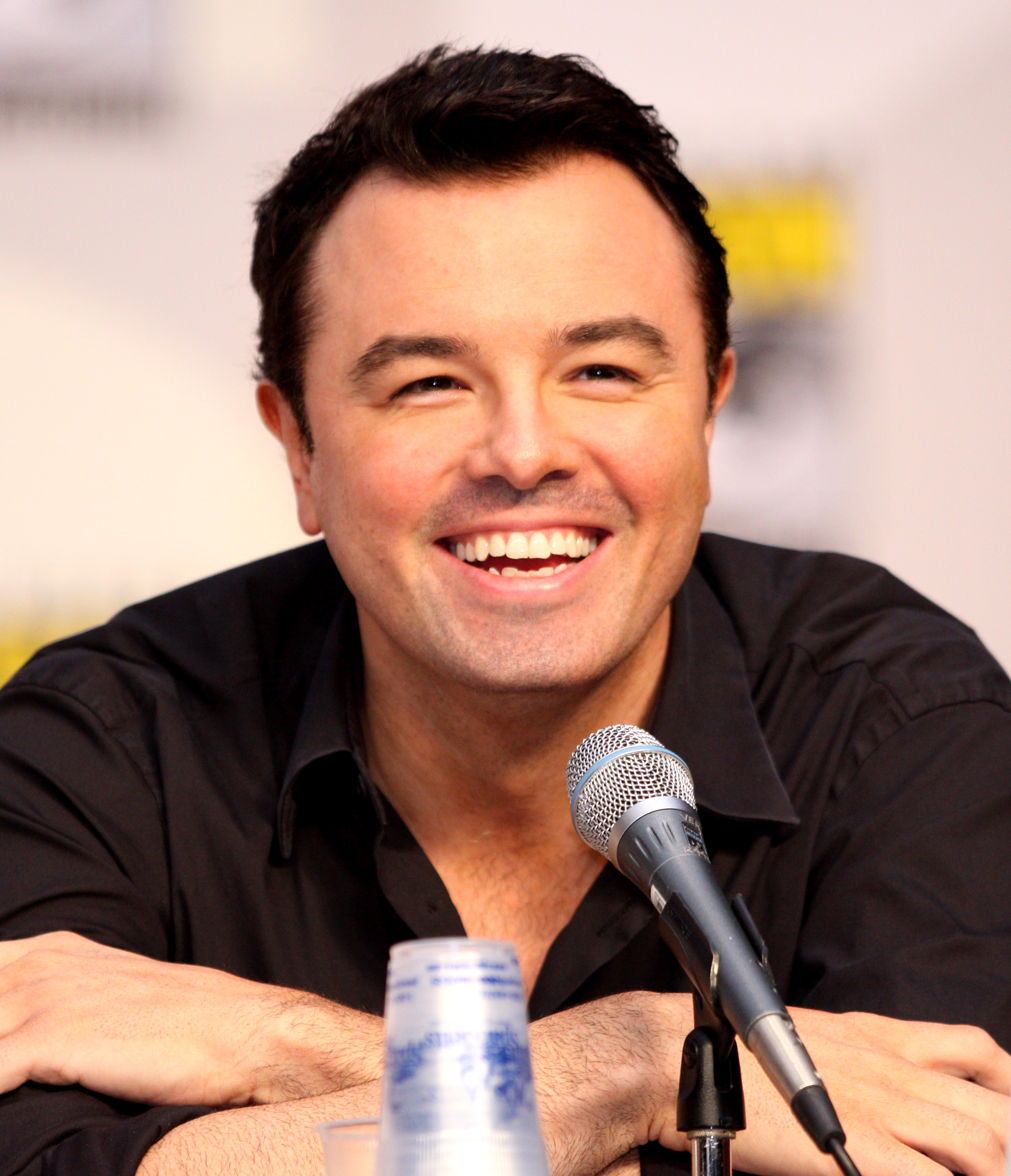
Producer Matthew Senreich commented that Seth MacFarlane added "a whole new layer of sympathy to [the] once evil character [of Palpatine]."

The episode features the voices of:

- Seth Green - Announcer, Bill Clinton, George W. Bush, Homeless man, Private Perkins, Jenna Bush, Max Rebo, Nerd, Ponda Baba, Space slug #2, Qui-Gon Jinn
- Candace Bailey - Girl, Princess Leia
- Abraham Benrubi - Darth Vader
- Bob Bergen - Luke Skywalker
- Ahmed Best - Jar Jar Binks, Imperial Army pilot
- Donald Faison - Dr. Evazan, Mace Windu
- Joey Fatone - Himself
- Keith Ferguson - Han Solo, C-3PO, Imperial probe droid
- Mark Hamill - Luke Skywalker (Spoilers sketch only)
- Hulk Hogan - Abraham Lincoln
- Tom Kane - C-3PO
- George Lucas - Himself
- Seth MacFarlane - Emperor Palpatine
- Malcolm McDowell - Imperial commander
- Breckin Meyer - Admiral Ackbar, Boba Fett, Janitor, Space slug #1
- Dan Milano - Boy, Cantina bartender, Luke Skywalker
- Chad Morgan - Laura Bush, Princess Leia, Weather girl
- Conan O'Brien - Ponda Baba's boss, Zuckuss
- Robert Smigel - Emperor Palpatine parody, Ray
- Adam Talbott - Jawa, Han Solo
- James Van Der Beek - Bush's aide

== Production ==
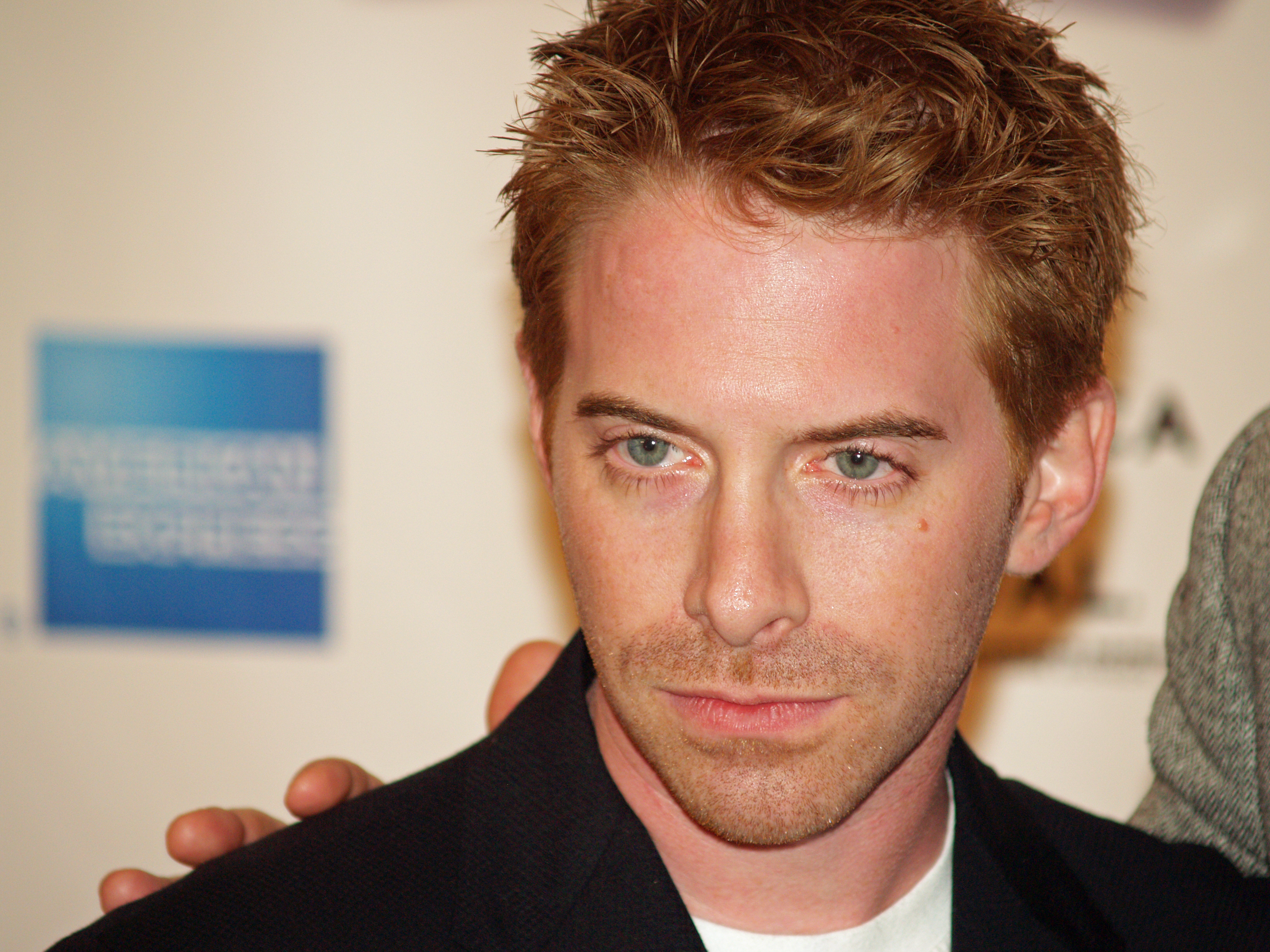
Seth Green directed the episode.

Robot Chicken had previously featured several Star Wars parodies in standard episodes of the show. One such sketch from the second season in 2006 featured Palpatine receiving a collect call from Darth Vader informing him of the Death Star's destruction, shortly after the conclusion of A New Hope. The sketch was pitched by Doug Goldstein (with Palpatine originally portrayed as a Bob Newhart-esque character) and rewritten by Breckin Meyer. The skit became popular and was uploaded to YouTube until it was eventually seen by Star Wars creator George Lucas. Impressed, Lucas invited the show's creators Seth Green and Matthew Senreich to Lucasfilm for a meeting. They permitted Green and Senreich to produce a 30-minute full Star Wars parody. Green noted "The people at Lucasfilm realized you could do a comedic take on Star Wars without compromising the integrity of any dramatic take."

The duo and the rest of the show's writing staff then spent three weeks writing material for the episode, with it being twice the length of a standard episode. The writers did not intentionally tone down their material as they knew that Lucasfilm would inform them of any items unsuitable for broadcast. Lucasfilm's director of marketing Tom Warner noted that "There were definitely a few [sketches] I batted an eye at, and if I were producing probably wouldn't have put in. But they were having fun with it." The writers decided not to choose "obvious" things to subvert so, for example, rather than just penning a sketch mocking Jar Jar Binks, had Jar Jar meet up with Darth Vader and react to the changes he has undergone since they last met. Goldstein noted "It was a wild challenge to come up with fresh, new stuff since Star Wars has already been parodied for 30 years now." On the style of the humor, Green opined: "We love to emphasize the mundane in the extraordinary, and Star Wars was perfect for that. You have something that's intergalactic, and yet there's got to be some textural machinations of day-to-day business: How can you run an industry that large without paperwork? And where are the bathrooms?"

From writing to animation, the episode took three months to produce. After the script was finished and approved, the animators storyboarded each scene and the dialogue was recorded before the two were merged into the animatic. As with the other episodes, stop-motion animation of custom-made action figures was used to produce the episode. Each animator produced 12 seconds of footage a day and the team, which Green directed, was finished in two weeks. Editing, visual and sound effects then took a further two months. Lucasfilm supplied them with the sound effects from the films. A sketch parodying the Han shot first controversy (which saw Han Solo and Greedo repeatedly attempt to shoot each other, but continually miss) was cut from the episode.

Green voices the majority of the characters, with others such as Mark Hamill, Conan O'Brien, Malcolm McDowell, Hulk Hogan, Ahmed Best, Joey Fatone as well as Lucas making appearances. Goldstein wanted James Earl Jones to appear, but they were unable to get him.

== Reception ==
Green won the Annie Award for Best Directing in an Animated Television Production for the episode. It was also nominated for Best Animated Television Production. The episode was nominated for the Primetime Emmy Award for Outstanding Animated Program (for Programming Less Than One Hour) in 2008, losing to the episode of The Simpsons "Eternal Moonshine of the Simpson Mind". Dan Iverson of IGN praised the special, calling it "head and shoulders above the hit and miss nature of the regular episodes of Robot Chicken." He concluded that "it is tough to find anything wrong with [it]" and "Robot Chicken went all out in creating a humorous half hour which would have us [Star Wars] nerds rolling on the floor laughing." Variety reviewer Brian Lowry praised the episode adding that "Lucas' fantasy has frequently sailed the smoothest when he takes a back seat and leaves the starship piloting to someone else." Aubry D'Arminio of Entertainment Weekly, in reviewing the DVD, stated "Every adult cartoon, from Family Guy to The Simpsons, has spawned a Star Wars parody, but the stop-motion maniacs at Robot Chicken top them all with 23 guffaw-filled minutes." Noel Murray of The A.V. Club gave an overall positive review stating the episode has "15 minutes of good gags" and "is pitched to anyone who grew up playing with the lesser-known Star Wars toys: the Ugnaughts, Bossks, and Dengars of the Kenner line."

A DVD of the episode was released on July 22, 2008.

== Sequels ==
Two sequels were created. The first was Robot Chicken: Star Wars Episode II, which aired on November 16, 2008. The second, Robot Chicken: Star Wars Episode III, aired on December 19, 2010.
