= Jar Jar Binks =

Star Wars character

- Star Wars character
- Jar Jar Binks as he appears in Episode II – Attack of the Clones
- First appearance: The Phantom Menace (1999)
- Created by: George Lucas
- Portrayed by: Ahmed Best (motion capture, some body close-ups, Episodes I–III)
- Voiced by: Ahmed Best (Note: all appearances except where noted); Phil LaMarr (three episodes of The Clone Wars, Lego: The Padawan Menace, and Lego Star Wars: The Skywalker Saga); Trevor Devall (Lego: The Yoda Chronicles and Lego: Droid Tales)

In-universe information
- Species: Gungan
- Gender: Male
- Occupation: General in the Gungan Grand Army; Representative of the Gungan race Senator of Chommell Sector (substituting for Padmé Amidala); Entertainer
- Affiliation: Gungan Grand Army, Galactic Republic, Galactic Senate, Delegation of 2000, Galactic Empire, Imperial Senate, New Republic
- Homeworld: Naboo

Jar Jar Binks is a fictional character from the Star Wars saga created by George Lucas. A member of the Gungan race, Jar Jar appears throughout the Star Wars prequel trilogy—as a major character in Star Wars: Episode I – The Phantom Menace, with a supporting role in Star Wars: Episode II – Attack of the Clones and a cameo in Star Wars: Episode III – Revenge of the Sith—as well as having a role in the television series Star Wars: The Clone Wars. One of the first fully computer-generated (CGI) supporting characters in a live-action film, he has been voiced by Ahmed Best in most of his appearances, who also acted out the character with prosthetics prior to the CGI work. He also appears in various other media.

Jar Jar's primary role in Episode I was to provide comic relief for the audience. He was met with overwhelming dislike from both audiences and critics, and has been recognized as one of the most hated characters in Star Wars and film history in general, with some commentators arguing that the character was based on stereotypes of black people, especially Jamaicans. The hate affected Best personally, who rejected the idea that the character was based on racist stereotypes.

In 2010, Adult Swim released Robot Chicken: Star Wars Episode III which included a sketch where Jar Jar, voiced by Ahmed Best himself, revealed that he was a Sith Lord throughout the six films, and had manipulated Palpatine himself. Five years later, in 2015, a Reddit user posted a fan theory that Jar Jar was originally going to be revealed as a manipulative villain, but this plot point was removed due to the character's unpopularity. The theory gained popularity on the internet, and was even encouraged by Best, who implied that it could have been partially true.

The character's reception has changed as he has been championed by fans who had seen the prequels at the time of their release as children. Best cited the audience reaching adulthood as well as their perspective as some of the reasons for the character's reassessment, as well as the newfound appreciation for the prequel trilogy. He has also been defended by members of the prequels' production team.

== Conception ==
George Lucas was inspired to develop Jar Jar based on the Disney character Goofy. Singer Michael Jackson wanted to play the role, but wished to portray the character using prosthetics while Lucas wanted him to be all CGI. (Note: Ahmed Best, who would end up playing the character, later hypothesized that Lucas might have felt uncomfortable with the thought of the singer's casting overshadowing the actual movie.) Ahmed Best was cast based on his work in the production of Stomp, as Lucas wanted someone athletic for the role. During his audition he performed several martial arts moves and flips, which according to Best was a contrast to how Lucas pictured the character, more in line with comedic silent actors such as Buster Keaton. After Lucas walked out of the audition, Best felt he had failed it. Terryl Whitlatch created the final designs for the "cowardly and insecure" character.

Best wore a prosthetic costume to portray Jar Jar, which cost about $100,000 and served as a reference for the actors to interact with, animators to base the performance on, and digital artists to match the lighting. He was the first computer-generated supporting character in a live-action film, although in a small number of shots (such as those only showing the character's hands or feet), the costume was not replaced with CGI.

== Appearances ==
=== Films ===
==== The Phantom Menace ====
Jar Jar Binks first appears in Star Wars: Episode I – The Phantom Menace as a bumbling, foolish Gungan from the planet Naboo who was banished by his tribe as punishment for his clumsiness. He is nearly killed by a Trade Federation transport, only to be saved at the last minute by Jedi Master Qui-Gon Jinn (Liam Neeson). Qui-Gon and his padawan, Obi-Wan Kenobi (Ewan McGregor), persuade Jar Jar's tribe to release him to their custody as a guide. He later goes with the Jedi and Padmé Amidala (Natalie Portman) to the planet Tatooine, where he meets and befriends nine-year-old slave Anakin Skywalker (Jake Lloyd).

Jar Jar later appears in the film's climactic battle scene, where he leads his fellow Gungans, as a general in the Gungan army, in defeating the Trade Federation. After the battle, he appears at the funeral of Qui-Gon Jinn and in the ending parade with his fellow Gungans.

==== Attack of the Clones ====
Jar Jar's role in Attack of the Clones is smaller, but his actions are significant. Ten years after helping save his planet, he is a delegate to the Galactic Senate and, as such, plays a role in bringing two of his old friends, Obi-Wan and Anakin (Hayden Christensen), back to Coruscant, where he greets them with enthusiasm. Later, on behalf of Naboo, he gives a speech to the assembled Senate in favor of granting Chancellor Palpatine (Ian McDiarmid) vast emergency powers.

==== Revenge of the Sith ====
Jar Jar appears in only a few scenes in Revenge of the Sith, and has no lines apart from a brief "excuse me". He was originally meant to have more lines, but they were removed. Also cut was a scene of Palpatine mockingly thanking Jar Jar for granting him emergency powers before crowning himself emperor. He is most prominently featured marching in front of Padmé Amidala's coffin during her funeral procession at the end of the film.

==== The Force Awakens ====
In a 2015 interview with Vanity Fair, J. J. Abrams suggested that he would include Jar Jar's skeleton in The Force Awakens as an Easter egg. This idea was later scrapped.

=== The Clone Wars television series ===
Jar Jar Binks is a supporting character in the animated series Star Wars: The Clone Wars, once again voiced by Best, although Phil LaMarr voiced the character in three episodes under the pseudonym BJ Hughes. In this series, he is a Senate representative who sometimes accompanies the main characters—Anakin, Obi-Wan, Padmé, and Anakin's padawan Ahsoka Tano—on their adventures. He and Jedi Master Mace Windu are the two main characters of the two-part episode "The Disappeared" in which they had to search for missing elders and rescue a queen, who was Jar Jar's past love interest.

=== Literature ===
==== Aftermath: Empire's End ====
Chuck Wendig's 2017 novel Star Wars: Aftermath: Empire's End, set one year after the events of Return of the Jedi, depicts Jar Jar as a street performer who entertains refugee children but is loathed by adults who blame him for his part in the rise of the Empire. Chris Taylor of Mashable wrote that the situation reflects real life in that adults disliked Jar Jar in the prequel films, but children were entertained by him.

==== Legends ====
With the 2012 acquisition of Lucasfilm by The Walt Disney Company, most of the licensed Star Wars novels and comics produced since the originating 1977 film Star Wars were rebranded as Star Wars Legends and declared non-canon to the franchise in April 2014.

In the game Star Wars: The Force Unleashed, Jar Jar is shown to have been frozen in carbonite by an Imperial officer and kept in his trophy room.

=== Video games ===
Jar Jar appears as a playable character in the Lego Star Wars video games, and appears as an Angry Bird with a hook move called "Jar Jar Wings" in Angry Birds Star Wars II.

=== Other appearances ===
Ahmed Best was signed on to portray Jar Jar in the show Star Wars Detours, but the series was never released.

== Reception ==
=== Initial response ===
Even before the release of The Phantom Menace, Jar Jar Binks became the subject of significant media and popular attention. After the film's release, Binks became symbolic of what many reviewers such as Brent Staples (The New York Times), David Edelstein (Slate), and Eric Harrison (Los Angeles Times) considered to be creative flaws of the film. The character was widely rejected and often ridiculed by people who felt that Jar Jar was included solely to appeal to children (a criticism first leveled at the Ewoks in Return of the Jedi). Bruce Handy of Vanity Fair wrote that "Jar Jar has come to symbolize what many fans see as the faults of the prequel trilogy: characters no one much cares about; a sense of humor geared toward the youngest conceivable audience members; an over-reliance on computer graphics; and story lines devoted to the kinds of convoluted political machinations which wouldn't have been out of place in adaptations of I, Claudius or The Rise and Fall of the Third Reich, but which fit less snugly in films with characters like Jar Jar Binks." One fan, Mike J. Nichols, created and distributed, free of charge, a modified version of the film, entitled The Phantom Edit, which cut out several scenes featuring what Nichols dubbed 'Jar Jar antics.' The character was also lampooned on an episode of the television show South Park entitled "Jakovasaurs", in The Fairly OddParents (Episode: "Abra-Catastrophe!"), The Simpsons (Episode: "Co-Dependents' Day"), as well as the parody Star Wars episodes of Robot Chicken, in which Best reprised the role in voice-over form.

In response to the criticism, Star Wars creator George Lucas stated that he feels there is a section of the fanbase upset that "the movies are for children but they don't want to admit that ... There is a small group of fans that do not like comic sidekicks. They want the films to be tough like The Terminator, and they get very upset and opinionated about anything that has anything to do with being childlike."

In 2018, Best said that the widespread criticism of his character negatively impacted his career and led him to consider suicide. After these comments were reported by The Guardian, fans expressed their support for Best on social media, with many, including Frank Oz (the actor portraying Yoda), denouncing the vitriol Best experienced. Oz wrote, "I LOVED Jar Jar Binks. I know I'll get raked over the coals for saying that but I just will never understand the harshness of people's dislike of him. I do character work. He is a GREAT character!"

=== Allegations of racial caricature ===
In an article for The Wall Street Journal, film critic Joe Morgenstern described the character as a "Rastafarian Stepin Fetchit on platform hoofs, crossed annoyingly with Butterfly McQueen." Legal scholar Patricia J. Williams argued that many aspects of Jar Jar Binks' characterization were reminiscent of the blackface archetypes in minstrel shows, and noting that "Jar Jar’s speech is a weird pidgin mush of West African, Caribbean and African-American linguistic styles", and that the "toadlike ruler of the Gungan race, who is called Boss Nass [...] seems to be wearing the distinctive West African robe known as a boubou". Academic Paul J. Ford suggested Jar Jar Binks is a "laid-back clown character" which utilizes stereotypes of Afro-Caribbean people. Lucasfilm denied any racist intention in the character's creation. George Lucas further stated that "those criticisms are made by people who've obviously never met a Jamaican ... How in the world could you take an orange amphibian and say that he's a Jamaican?". Ahmed Best also rejected such claims, stating that "Jar Jar has nothing to do with the Caribbean".

=== Speculations of villainy ===
On December 19, 2010, Adult Swim released Robot Chicken: Star Wars Episode III, an animated comedy special parody of Star Wars. In the first sketch, titled The Emperor's Back, Emperor Palpatine feels remorse for his actions and calls Jar Jar, voiced by Ahmed Best himself, on the telephone, apologizing to him for manipulating him into granting Palpatine emergency powers in the senate during Attack of the Clones. Jar Jar pretends to accept this apology, feigning innocence, but after he hangs up he reveals that he was in fact a Sith Lord, named Darth Jar Jar, who only pretended to be manipulated by Palpatine and actually manipulated Palpatine himself. This sketch was in reference to a popular in-joke among Star Wars fans.

Five years later, in late October 2015, a Reddit user by the name of "Lumpawarroo" (the name of Chewbacca's son) published a detailed theory speculating that Jar Jar was originally written as a major antagonist of the series, a manipulative, prominent collaborator of Palpatine, before being written off from his major villain's role due to the character's negative reception. A response in the theory further gave it the name of "Darth Jar Jar", mixing his name with the usual Sith title. This theory was related to an earlier interview with actor Ahmed Best in /r/IAmA, where he claimed that Jar Jar had been displaced from the story's main focus due to the backlash, implying at the same time that the hate received by the character was not entirely unintentional.

The post quickly became popular and received significant media coverage internationally by independent bloggers and major news outlets like The Guardian, The Washington Post, and The New York Times, which included analysis of his actions in The Phantom Menace. Journalist Andrew Street from The Guardian called it a "classic twist", comparing it to Yoda's role in The Empire Strikes Back, while Matt Hickey from Forbes went to the extent of contacting George Lucas about the question, but received no answer.

In response to the speculations, Best tweeted, "I will say this, it feels really good when the hidden meaning behind the work is seen. No matter how long it takes," apparently confirming the theory. Some months later, he expanded upon his tweet in a YouTube interview, stating, "there is a lot about [the theory] that is true, there are some things about it that are not true ... Could Jar Jar have evolved into that? I think the answer is yes. Because of the backlash, and rightfully so, Lucasfilm backed off of Jar Jar a lot, but a lot of the influence that I put into the character mirrored a lot of what was already in the Star Wars universe." Best concluded only Lucas could unveil the actual role of Binks, yet he also claimed that a deleted scene from Attack of the Clones would have still shown Palpatine darkly confiding his plans about the Empire to Jar Jar.

J. J. Abrams, who directed two installments of the franchise's sequel trilogy after its buyout by Disney, personally approved of the theory about the villainous Jar Jar. He described Lumpawarroo's argumentation as an "unbelievably lengthy analysis, in a very seriously thought-out way, as to why it's obviously true he's [evil]."

In 2019, when questioned about it, Best stated again only Lucas could answer, but he confirmed the theorists' idea of Jar Jar's antics being actually a disguised fighting style akin to drunken boxing, revealing that he based his performance on Jackie Chan's role in the 1978 film Drunken Master. He said, "the Darth Jar Jar theory caught it - caught it. I never thought anybody would see that".

The Darth Jar Jar theory is referenced in the animated miniseries Lego Star Wars: Rebuild the Galaxy, in which a Jedi relic accidentally rewrites reality and turns Jar Jar (reprised by Best) into a Sith Lord. In 2025, Jar Jar was added to Fortnite Battle Royale as part of the Star Wars-themed "Galactic Battle" season, where he is depicted as a Sith Lord capable of using Force Lightning.

=== Character reassessment ===
I actually felt terrible that Ahmed Best suffered so much. I remember when he came out to [ILM headquarters] Kerner and I met him, showed him around, and I said, "We're really interested in having your interpretation of this character. You're going to bring a lot to this, the personality is something that we have not experienced that yet. And that's going to be your part in it."

And he was this kid in his twenties, who did that beautiful Stomp, that show that he was involved in, which we all got to see. George let us see a special [performance] of that -- yeah, that was during a company meeting. There was a big theater up there in San Rafael, and the company meeting turned out to be a little bit of conversation and then we got to see Stomp. Ahmed was in that thing, and I was just like, "This is so cool!" It was just wonderful.

So here he was, this kid I think had hoped that this was going to be something that transformed his life in a really great way. Who wouldn't think that? It's an opportunity to work on a Star Wars movie.

— Digital model designer Jean Bolte remembers meeting actor Ahmed Best.

Since the release of The Phantom Menace, cast and crew who have worked on the Star Wars films and viewers have defended Jar Jar Binks (as well as Best).

Lucas defended Jar Jar by clarifying that the Star Wars films were made for 12-year-old children. He has said from the beginning in early interviews for A New Hope that the series was intended for children. In April 2019, during the annual Star Wars Celebration event ahead of the 20th anniversary panel for The Phantom Menace, George Lucas named Jar Jar as his favorite Star Wars character.

In an interview with IGN during the premiere of The Force Awakens, Yoda's performer Frank Oz stated that Jar Jar Binks is his favorite character: "I love Jar Jar Binks. I swear to god I do ... When I saw that script I thought he was a fantastic character and I don't know what the heck happened ... I thought he was fantastic; he was hysterical. He reminded me of Abbott and Costello."

Actor Liam Neeson praised Ahmed Best for his portrayal of Jar Jar: "I know a lot of fans and critics didn't like it. [Best] received a lot of criticism, to the point where it really hurt his career. And I have to say that when he was making that movie, with Best as Jar Jar Binks and with Ewan McGregor as young Obi-Wan Kenobi, he was probably one of the funniest and most talented guys I've ever worked with. I remember calling ... my old ex-agent ... and saying, 'Listen, I think I just worked with the new Eddie Murphy.' And I still believe it."

During the 20th anniversary of The Phantom Menace, many members of the prequel production team have defended the character and appreciated the public's acceptance at the Star Wars Celebration panel. Visual effects supervisor John Knoll reflected: "Well, I think it's good to see [his newfound popularity], because I think George took a lot of the criticism pretty harshly. It was kind of painful for me to see how cruel people were about it and how personally George took it. I think the movies didn't deserve as much hate as they received. It hurt me to see how much George took those things." He also said, "I thought [the Star Wars Celebration panel] was great, especially the warm reaction there was to Ahmed. I know he took all the vicious comments people had about Jar Jar very hard. That's not his fault, he didn't write that character. He's an actor who did a really good job and worked hard to get it right. Seeing the really warm reaction of the crowd made me feel ... It was moving." Animation director Rob Coleman said that twenty years later he still has younger people coming up to him and telling him that Jar Jar is their favorite character. Digital model designer Jean Bolte cited Jar Jar as one of her favorite characters to work with alongside Sebulba and Yoda, saying, "Going to Star Wars Celebration and seeing and hearing the fans so interested in which one was our contribution ... It really completely changed my point of view about being privileged to have had anything to do with these films."

In an interview with Europa Press during the premiere of Rogue One: A Star Wars Story, a journalist asked actress Felicity Jones who she would like to receive a gift from if she were in the Star Wars galaxy at Christmas time and she said either Jar Jar or C-3P0.

Following the reassessment of Jar Jar (as well as the reappraisal of the prequel trilogy), C-3PO actor Anthony Daniels reflected in his memoirs that "the years have been kinder to this, the first Prequel. Many, who were young at the time, still hold it, and Jar Jar Binks as their dearest memory of the Saga."

Best was moved by people's appreciation for Jar Jar: "It was definitely the kids. I had to start looking at Jar Jar through their eyes, and that's what made me smile again. Now those kids, they are between 20 and 30 years old. They have a different perspective on The Phantom Menace. The Phantom Menace, for them, is their Star Wars. [Episodes] IV, V and VI, that's their parents' Star Wars, and VII, VIII and IX, that's their children's Star Wars. But the prequels, that's theirs, and they defend the prequels. So I see the same thing. I see the resurgence of The Phantom Menace." He then talked about his experience of going to Star Wars Celebration: "To be very honest, I was very afraid to go to Celebration. Every time I'm in a Star Wars setting, I spend most of my time defending our work and defending Jar Jar. And I just don't want to do that anymore. So I was very reluctant to come to Celebration because of that, and I have to say, I was pleasantly surprised. It wasn't the case at all. I just felt nothing but love and respect and admiration for the work we did. I couldn't have been more proud and I couldn't have been happier. I wish George was there because I think we're at a time right now where we have to stand in that work. We have to say, "We did it," and step into that in a very proud way, because it stands the test of time."
