= Matthew Senreich =

American television producer (born 1974)

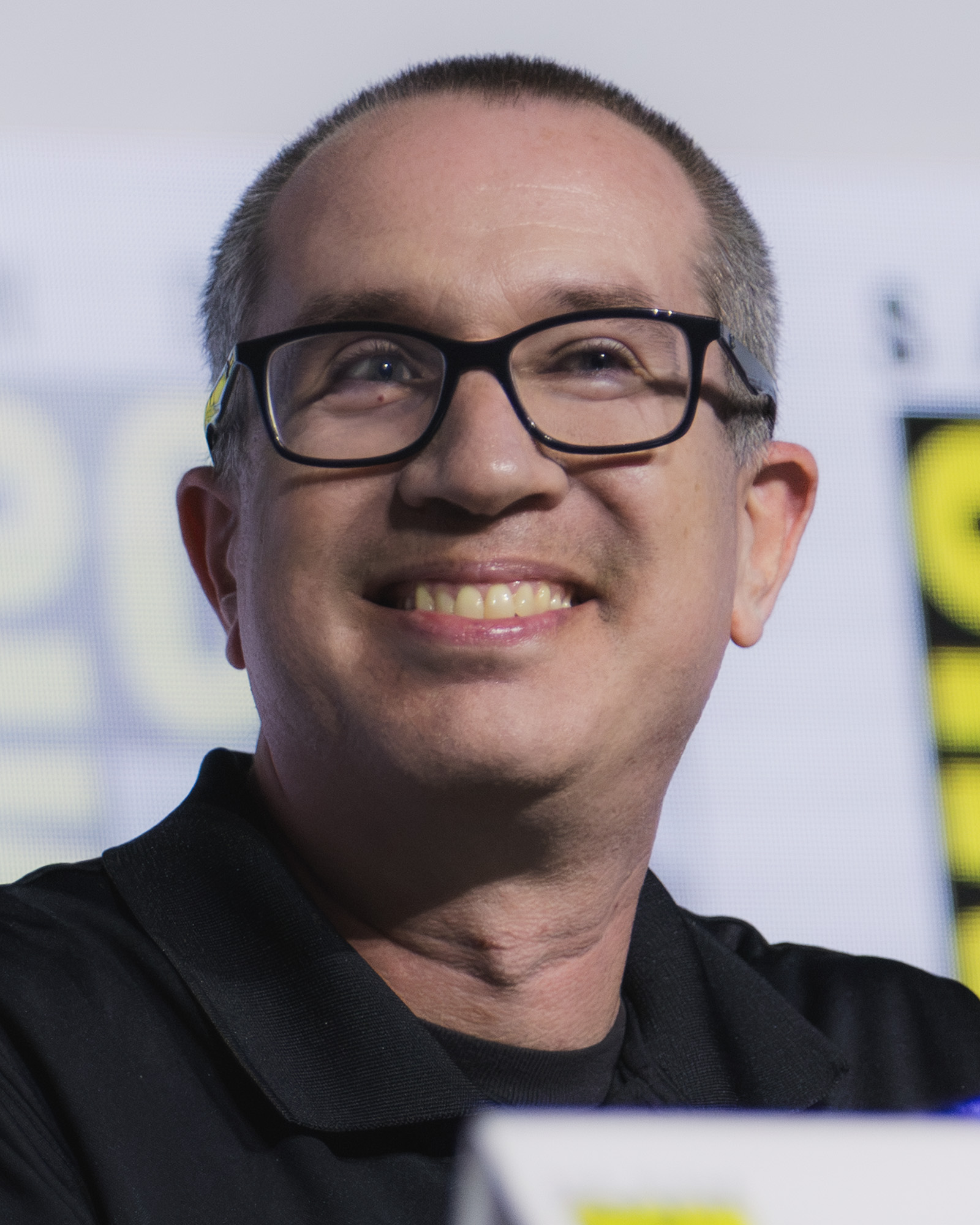
- Senreich in 2026
- Born: Matthew Ian Senreich; June 17, 1974 (age 52); Long Island, New York, U.S.
- Other names: Matt Senreich; Matty Senreich
- Occupations: Screenwriter; producer; television director; voice actor
- Years active: 2005–present

Matthew Ian Senreich (/ˈsɛnraɪʃ/; born June 17, 1974) is an American screenwriter, television producer, director, and voice actor best known for his work with animated television series Robot Chicken, which he co-created with business partner and close friend Seth Green.

== Early life ==
Born to a Jewish family, Senreich graduated from Herricks High School in New Hyde Park, New York.

== Career ==
In 1996, Senreich was employed by Wizard Entertainment, gradually rising to become its editorial director. In 1996 or 1997, Senreich met Green when the actor, a fan of Wizard magazine, responded enthusiastically to an interview request. With Green, Senreich created in 2000 and 2001 Sweet J Presents, a web-based series of animated shorts presented on screenblast.com. Adult Swim contracted the Robot Chicken series on the basis of these shorts.

=== Stoopid Monkey ===
Senreich and Green together run the production company Stoopid Monkey. His Emmy nominations were shared with other key members of the production staff of Robot Chicken, including partner Seth Green, for "Outstanding Animated Program (For Programming Less Than One Hour)" in 2007, 2008, and 2009. Senreich received an Emmy Award for Outstanding Short-Format Animated Program (shared with key members of his production staff) at the 62nd annual Emmy Award ceremony held on August 29, 2010.

Senreich along with Tom Root have created Titan Maximum, a television series on Adult Swim, that premiered on September 27, 2009.

== Filmography ==
=== Television ===
Year	Title	Producer	Writer	Actor	Role	Notes
2005–present	Robot Chicken	Yes	Yes	Yes	Himself, The Flash, Additional voices	Co-creator
2007	Robot Chicken: Star Wars	Yes	Yes	No		Co-creator (TV movie)
2008	Robot Chicken: Star Wars Episode II	Yes	Yes	No		Co-creator (TV movie)
2009	Titan Maximum	Yes	Yes	Yes	Co-creator	Co-creator (TV movie)
2010	Robot Chicken: Star Wars Episode III	Yes	Yes	Yes	Additional voices	
2012	Star Wars: The Clone Wars	No	No	Yes	Bartender	Episode: "Bounty"
2012	Robot Chicken DC Comics Special	Yes	Yes	Yes	The Flash, Additional voices	
2014	Robot Chicken DC Comics Special 2: Villains in Paradise	Yes	Yes	Yes	The Flash, Additional voices	
2015–2019	SuperMansion	Yes	Yes	No		Co-creator
2015	Robot Chicken DC Comics Special III: Magical Friendship	Yes	Yes	Yes	The Flash, Additional voices	
2017	Buddy Thunderstruck	Yes	No	No	Narrator	Executive producer
Cancelled	Star Wars Detours	Yes	Yes	No		

=== Film ===
Year	Title	Notes
2018	The Predator Holiday Special	Writer
TBA	Untitled Rabbids film	Writer
