= List of Robot Chicken episodes =

List of episodes for an animated series

Robot Chicken is an American stop-motion animated television series created by Seth Green and Matthew Senreich that premiered on Cartoon Network's nighttime programming block Adult Swim on February 20, 2005, at 11:30 p.m. EST. The eleventh and most recent season premiered on September 7, 2021, at 12:00 a.m. EDT.

As of August 30, 2026, 220 episodes of Robot Chicken have aired, concluding the eleventh season. There have also been a number of half-hour specials.

== Series overview ==
Series overview
Season	Episodes	Originally released	
Season	Episodes	First released	Last released
1	20	February 20, 2005	July 17, 2005
2	20	April 2, 2006	November 19, 2006
3	20	August 12, 2007	October 5, 2008
4	20	December 7, 2008	December 6, 2009
5	20	December 12, 2010	January 16, 2012
6	20	September 17, 2012	February 17, 2013
7	20	April 13, 2014	December 7, 2014
8	20	October 25, 2015	May 15, 2016
9	20	December 10, 2017	July 22, 2018
10	20	September 30, 2019	July 27, 2020
11	20	September 7, 2021	April 11, 2022

== Episodes ==
=== Season 1 (2005) ===
No. overall	No. in season	Title	Directed by	Written by	Original release date	Prod. code
1	1	"Junk in the Trunk"	Matthew Senreich	Seth Green, Pat McCallum & Matthew Senreich	February 20, 2005	102
2	2	"Nutcracker Sweet"	Doug Goldstein	Seth Green, Matthew Senreich & Mike Fasolo	February 27, 2005	105
3	3	"Gold Dust Gasoline"	Tom Root	Seth Green, Matthew Senreich & Mike Fasolo	March 6, 2005	106
4	4	"Plastic Buffet"	Tom Root	Seth Green, Matthew Senreich & Mike Fasolo	March 13, 2005	108
5	5	"Toyz in the Hood"	Matthew Senreich	Seth Green, Mike Fasolo, Pat McCallum & Matthew Senreich	March 20, 2005	110
6	6	"Vegetable Fun Fest"	Doug Goldstein	Seth Green, Mike Fasolo & Matthew Senreich	March 27, 2005	111
7	7	"A Piece of the Action"	Seth Green	Seth Green, Matthew Senreich & Mike Fasolo	April 3, 2005	109
8	8	"The Deep End"	Seth Green	Seth Green, Pat McCallum & Matthew Senreich	April 10, 2005	101
9	9	"S&M Present"	Tom Root	Seth Green, Mike Fasolo, Pat McCallum & Matthew Senreich	April 17, 2005	112
10	10	"Badunkadunk!"	Seth Green	Seth Green, Mike Fasolo & Matthew Senreich	April 24, 2005	113
11	11	"Toy Meets Girl"	Matthew Senreich	Seth Green, Mike Fasolo, Pat McCallum & Matthew Senreich	May 1, 2005	114
12	12	"Midnight Snack"	Seth Green	Seth Green, Mike Fasolo & Matthew Senreich	May 15, 2005	115
13	13	"Atta Toy"	Tom Root	Seth Green, Mike Fasolo & Matthew Senreich	May 22, 2005	116
14	14	"Joint Point"	Doug Goldstein	Seth Green, Mike Fasolo & Matthew Senreich	June 5, 2005	117
15	15	"Kiddie Pool"	Doug Goldstein	Seth Green, Matthew Senreich & Mike Fasolo	June 12, 2005	107
16	16	"Nightmare Generator"	Matthew Senreich	Seth Green, Mike Fasolo, Pat McCallum & Matthew Senreich	June 19, 2005	103
17	17	"Operation: Rich in Spirit"	Seth Green	Seth Green, Mike Fasolo & Matthew Senreich	June 26, 2005	118
18A	18A	"The Sack"	Matthew Senreich	Seth Green, Mike Fasolo, Pat McCallum & Matthew Senreich	July 3, 2005	104A
18B	18B	"Adultizzle Swizzle"	Matthew Senreich	Seth Green, Matthew Senreich, Mike Fasolo & Pat McCallum	April 11, 2008; May 16, 2008	104B
19	19	"That Hurts Me!"	Matthew Senreich	Seth Green, Mike Fasolo & Matthew Senreich	July 10, 2005	119
20	20	"The Black Cherry"	Doug Goldstein	Seth Green, Mike Fasolo & Matthew Senreich	July 17, 2005	120

=== Season 2 (2006) ===
No. overall	No. in season	Title	Directed by	Written by	Original release date	Prod. code
21	1	"Suck It!"	Seth Green	Seth Green, Mike Fasolo, Charles Horn, Breckin Meyer & Matthew Senreich	April 2, 2006	201
22	2	"Federated Resources"	Seth Green	Seth Green, Mike Fasolo, Charles Horn, Breckin Meyer & Matthew Senreich	April 9, 2006	205
23	3	"Easter Basket"	Tom Root	Seth Green, Mike Fasolo, Charles Horn, Breckin Meyer & Matthew Senreich	April 16, 2006	202
24	4	"Celebrity Rocket"	Tom Root	Seth Green, Jordan Allen-Dutton, Mike Fasolo, Charles Horn, Breckin Meyer, Matthew Senreich & Erik Weiner	April 23, 2006	204
25	5	"Dragon Nuts"	Doug Goldstein	Seth Green, Jordan Allen-Dutton, Mike Fasolo, Charles Horn, Breckin Meyer, Matthew Senreich & Erik Weiner	April 30, 2006	206
26	6	"1987"	Doug Goldstein	Seth Green, Mike Fasolo, Charles Horn, Breckin Meyer & Matthew Senreich	May 7, 2006	203
27	7	"Cracked China"	Matthew Senreich	Jordan Allen-Dutton, Mike Fasolo, Seth Green, Matthew Senreich & Erik Weiner	May 14, 2006	207
28	8	"Rodiggity"	Matthew Senreich	Jordan Allen-Dutton, Mike Fasolo, Seth Green, Charles Horn, Breckin Meyer, Matthew Senreich & Erik Weiner	May 21, 2006	208
29	9	"Massage Chair"	Doug Goldstein	Jordan Allen-Dutton, Mike Fasolo, Seth Green, Matthew Senreich & Erik Weiner	May 28, 2006	210
30	10	"Password: Swordfish"	Matthew Senreich	Jordan Allen-Dutton, Mike Fasolo, Seth Green, Matthew Senreich & Erik Weiner	June 4, 2006	209
31	11	"Adoption's an Option"	Tom Root	Hugh Davidson, Jordan Allen-Dutton, Mike Fasolo, Seth Green, Dan Milano, Matthew Senreich & Erik Weiner	September 17, 2006	216
32	12	"The Munnery"	Doug Goldstein	Hugh Davidson, Mike Fasolo, Seth Green, Dan Milano & Matthew Senreich	September 24, 2006	215
33	13	"Metal Militia"	Seth Green	Hugh Davidson, Jordan Allen-Dutton, Mike Fasolo, Seth Green, Dan Milano, Matthew Senreich & Erik Weiner	October 1, 2006	211
34	14A	"Veggies for Sloth"	Matthew Senreich	Hugh Davidson, Jordan Allen-Dutton, Mike Fasolo, Seth Green, Dan Milano, Matthew Senreich & Erik Weiner	October 8, 2006	212A
34B	14B	"Blankets in a Pig"	Matthew Senreich	Hugh Davidson, Jordan Allen-Dutton, Mike Fasolo, Seth Green, Dan Milano, Matthew Senreich & Erik Weiner	April 11, 2008; May 15, 2008	212B
35	15	"Sausage Fest"	Tom Root	Hugh Davidson, Mike Fasolo, Seth Green, Dan Milano & Matthew Senreich	October 15, 2006	213
36	16	"Drippy Pony"	Doug Goldstein	Hugh Davidson, Mike Fasolo, Seth Green, Dan Milano & Matthew Senreich	October 22, 2006	214
37	17	"A Day at the Circus"	Tom Root	Jordan Allen-Dutton, Mike Fasolo, Seth Green, Dan Milano, Matthew Senreich & Erik Weiner	October 29, 2006	217
38	18	"Lust for Puppets"	Seth Green	Hugh Davidson, Jordan Allen-Dutton, Mike Fasolo, Seth Green, Dan Milano, Matthew Senreich & Erik Weiner	November 5, 2006	218
39	19	"Anne Marie's Pride" "Donkey Punch"	Seth Green	Jordan Allen-Dutton, Mike Fasolo, Seth Green, Dan Milano, Matthew Senreich & Erik Weiner	November 12, 2006	219
40	20	"Book of Corrine"	Matthew Senreich	Jordan Allen-Dutton, Mike Fasolo, Seth Green, Dan Milano, Matthew Senreich & Erik Weiner	November 19, 2006	220

=== Season 3 (2007–08) ===
No. overall	No. in season	Title	Directed by	Written by	Original release date	Prod. code
41	1	"Werewolf vs. Unicorn"	Chris McKay	Seth Green, Mike Fasolo, Matthew Senreich, Kevin Shinick & Zeb Wells	August 12, 2007	301
42	2	"Squaw Bury Shortcake"	Chris McKay	Seth Green, Mike Fasolo, Matthew Senreich, Kevin Shinick & Zeb Wells	August 19, 2007	303
43	3	"Rabbits on a Roller Coaster"	Chris McKay	Seth Green, Mike Fasolo, Matthew Senreich, Kevin Shinick & Zeb Wells	August 26, 2007	304
44	4	"Tapping a Hero"	Seth Green & Chris McKay	Seth Green, Mike Fasolo, Matthew Senreich, Kevin Shinick & Zeb Wells	September 2, 2007	305
45	5	"Shoe"	Chris McKay	Seth Green, Mike Fasolo, Harp Pekin, Ben Schwartz, Matthew Senreich & Kevin Shinick	September 9, 2007	306
46	6	"Endless Breadsticks"	Chris McKay	Seth Green, Mike Fasolo, Harp Pekin, Ben Schwartz, Matthew Senreich & Kevin Shinick	September 16, 2007	307
47	7	"Yancy the Yo-Yo Boy"	Matthew Senreich	Seth Green, Mike Fasolo, Harp Pekin, Ben Schwartz, Matthew Senreich & Kevin Shinick	September 23, 2007	308
48	8	"More Blood, More Chocolate"	Chris McKay	Seth Green, Mike Fasolo, Harp Pekin, Ben Schwartz, Matthew Senreich & Kevin Shinick	September 30, 2007	309
49	9	"Celebutard Mountain"	Chris McKay	Seth Green, Mike Fasolo, Breckin Meyer, Matthew Senreich & Kevin Shinick	October 7, 2007	311
50	10	"Moesha Poppins"	Seth Green	Seth Green, Mike Fasolo, Breckin Meyer, Matthew Senreich & Kevin Shinick	October 21, 2007	312
51	11	"Ban on the Fun"	Chris McKay & Matthew Senreich	Seth Green, Mike Fasolo, Breckin Meyer, Matthew Senreich & Kevin Shinick	October 28, 2007	313
52	12	"Losin' the Wobble"	Chris McKay	Seth Green, Mike Fasolo, Breckin Meyer, Matthew Senreich & Kevin Shinick	November 4, 2007	314
53	13	"Slaughterhouse on the Prairie"	Chris McKay	Seth Green, Mike Fasolo, Breckin Meyer, Matthew Senreich & Kevin Shinick	November 11, 2007	315
54	14	"Robot Chicken's Half-Assed Christmas Special"	Matthew Senreich	Seth Green, Mike Fasolo, Harp Pekin, Ben Schwartz, Matthew Senreich & Kevin Shinick	December 9, 2007	310
55	15	"Tubba-Bubba's Now Hubba-Hubba"	Chris McKay	Seth Green, Mike Fasolo, Breckin Meyer, Matthew Senreich & Kevin Shinick	April 1, 2008 (April Fools Sneak Peek); July 4, 2008 (Episode's Premiere)	302
56	16	"Boo Cocky"	Chris McKay	Seth Green, Hugh Davidson, Mike Fasolo, Matthew Senreich & Erik Weiner	September 7, 2008	316
57	17	"Bionic Cow"	Chris McKay	Seth Green, Hugh Davidson, Mike Fasolo, Matthew Senreich & Erik Weiner	September 14, 2008	317
58	18	"Monstourage"	Chris McKay	Seth Green, Hugh Davidson, Mike Fasolo, Matthew Senreich & Erik Weiner	September 21, 2008	318
59	19	"President Evil"	Chris McKay	Seth Green, Hugh Davidson, Mike Fasolo, Matthew Senreich & Erik Weiner	September 28, 2008	319
60	20	"Chirlaxx"	Seth Green	Seth Green, Hugh Davidson, Mike Fasolo, Matthew Senreich & Erik Weiner	October 5, 2008	320

=== Season 4 (2008–09) ===
No. overall	No. in season	Title	Directed by	Written by	Original release date	Prod. code
61	1	"Help Me"	Chris McKay	Hugh Davidson, Mike Fasolo, Seth Green, Geoff Johns, Matthew Senreich, Kevin Shinick & Zeb Wells	December 7, 2008	401
62	2	"They Took My Thumbs"	Chris McKay	Hugh Davidson, Mike Fasolo, Seth Green, Geoff Johns, Matthew Senreich, Kevin Shinick & Zeb Wells	December 14, 2008	404
63	3	"I'm Trapped"	Chris McKay	Hugh Davidson, Mike Fasolo, Seth Green, Geoff Johns, Matthew Senreich, Kevin Shinick & Zeb Wells	December 21, 2008	402
64	4	"In a DVD Factory"	Chris McKay	Hugh Davidson, Mike Fasolo, Seth Green, Geoff Johns, Matthew Senreich, Kevin Shinick & Zeb Wells	December 28, 2008	403
65	5	"Tell My Mom"	Chris McKay	Mike Fasolo, Seth Green, Breckin Meyer, Matthew Senreich, Kevin Shinick & Zeb Wells	January 4, 2009	406
66	6	"P.S. Yes, in That Way"	Chris McKay	Mike Fasolo, Seth Green, Breckin Meyer, Matthew Senreich, Kevin Shinick & Zeb Wells	January 11, 2009	410
67	7	"Love, Maurice"	Chris McKay	Mike Fasolo, Seth Green, Breckin Meyer, Matthew Senreich, Kevin Shinick & Zeb Wells	January 18, 2009	409
68	8	"2 Weeks Without Food"	Chris McKay	Hugh Davidson, Mike Fasolo, Seth Green, Geoff Johns, Matthew Senreich, Kevin Shinick & Zeb Wells	January 25, 2009	405
69	9	"But Not in That Way"	Chris McKay	Mike Fasolo, Seth Green, Breckin Meyer, Matthew Senreich, Kevin Shinick & Zeb Wells	February 1, 2009	408
70	10	"I Love Her"	Chris McKay	Mike Fasolo, Seth Green, Breckin Meyer, Matthew Senreich, Kevin Shinick & Zeb Wells	February 8, 2009	407
71	11	"We Are a Humble Factory"	Chris McKay	Hugh Davidson, Mike Fasolo, Seth Green, Matthew Senreich, Kevin Shinick & Zeb Wells	July 26, 2009	412
72	12	"Maurice Was Caught"	Chris McKay	Mike Fasolo, Seth Green, Hugh Davidson, Matthew Senreich, Kevin Shinick & Zeb Wells	August 2, 2009	413
73	13	"Unionizing Our Labor"	Chris McKay	Mike Fasolo, Seth Green, Hugh Davidson, Matthew Senreich, Kevin Shinick & Zeb Wells	August 9, 2009	414
74	14	"President Hu Forbids It"	Chris McKay	Mike Fasolo, Seth Green, Hugh Davidson, Matthew Senreich, Kevin Shinick & Zeb Wells	August 16, 2009	415
75	15	"Due to Constraints of Time and Budget"	Chris McKay	Jordan Allen-Dutton, Mike Fasolo, Seth Green, Matthew Senreich, Kevin Shinick & Erik Weiner	August 23, 2009	416
76	16	"The Ramblings of Maurice"	Chris McKay	Jordan Allen-Dutton, Mike Fasolo, Seth Green, Matthew Senreich, Kevin Shinick & Erik Weiner	August 30, 2009	417
77	17	"Cannot Be Erased, So Sorry"	Chris McKay	Jordan Allen-Dutton, Mike Fasolo, Seth Green, Matthew Senreich, Kevin Shinick & Erik Weiner	September 6, 2009	418
78	18	"Please Do Not Notify Our Contractors"	Chris McKay	Jordan Allen-Dutton, Mike Fasolo, Seth Green, Matthew Senreich, Kevin Shinick & Erik Weiner	September 13, 2009	419
79	19	"Especially the Animal Keith Crofford!"	Chris McKay	Jordan Allen-Dutton, Mike Fasolo, Seth Green, Matthew Senreich, Kevin Shinick & Erik Weiner	September 20, 2009	420
80	20	"Dear Consumer" "Robot Chicken's Full-Assed Christmas Special"	Chris McKay	Jordan Allen-Dutton, Mike Fasolo, Seth Green, Matthew Senreich, Kevin Shinick & Erik Weiner	December 6, 2009	411

=== Season 5 (2010–12) ===
No. overall	No. in season	Title	Directed by	Written by	Original release date	Prod. code
81	1	"Robot Chicken's DP Christmas Special"	Chris McKay	Matthew Beans, Mike Fasolo, Seth Green, Brendan Hay, Daniel Libman, Matthew Libman, Matthew Senreich & Zeb Wells	December 12, 2010	506
82	2	"Saving Private Gigli"	Chris McKay	Matthew Beans, Mike Fasolo, Seth Green, Breckin Meyer, Eric Schaar, Matthew Senreich & Zeb Wells	January 9, 2011	501
83	3	"Terms of Endaredevil"	Chris McKay	Matthew Beans, Mike Fasolo, Seth Green, Breckin Meyer, Eric Schaar, Matthew Senreich & Zeb Wells	January 16, 2011	502
84	4	"Big Trouble in Little Clerks 2"	Chris McKay	Matthew Beans, Mike Fasolo, Seth Green, Breckin Meyer, Eric Schaar, Matthew Senreich & Zeb Wells	January 23, 2011	503
85	5	"Kramer vs. Showgirls"	Chris McKay	Matthew Beans, Mike Fasolo, Seth Green, Breckin Meyer, Eric Schaar, Matthew Senreich & Zeb Wells	January 30, 2011	504
86	6	"Malcolm X: Fully Loaded"	Chris McKay	Matthew Beans, Mike Fasolo, Seth Green, Breckin Meyer, Eric Schaar, Matthew Senreich & Zeb Wells	February 6, 2011	505
87	7	"Major League of Extraordinary Gentlemen"	Chris McKay	Matthew Beans, Mike Fasolo, Seth Green, Brendan Hay, Daniel Libman, Matthew Libman, Matthew Senreich & Zeb Wells	February 13, 2011	507
88	8	"Schindler's Bucket List"	Chris McKay	Matthew Beans, Mike Fasolo, Seth Green, Brendan Hay, Daniel Libman, Matthew Libman, Matthew Senreich & Zeb Wells	February 20, 2011	508
89	9	"No Country for Old Dogs"	Chris McKay	Matthew Beans, Mike Fasolo, Seth Green, Brendan Hay, Daniel Libman, Matthew Libman, Matthew Senreich & Zeb Wells	February 27, 2011	509
90	10	"Catch Me If You Kangaroo Jack"	Chris McKay	Matthew Beans, Mike Fasolo, Seth Green, Brendan Hay, Daniel Libman, Matthew Libman, Matthew Senreich & Zeb Wells	March 6, 2011	510
91	11	"Beastmaster and Commander"	Chris McKay	Matthew Beans, Mike Fasolo, Seth Green, Breckin Meyer, Matthew Senreich, Zeb Wells & Harland Williams	October 24, 2011	511
92	12	"Casablankman"	Chris McKay	Matthew Beans, Mike Fasolo, Seth Green, Breckin Meyer, Matthew Senreich, Zeb Wells & Harland Williams	October 31, 2011	512
93	13	"The Departy Monster"	Chris McKay	Matthew Beans, Mike Fasolo, Seth Green, Breckin Meyer, Matthew Senreich, Zeb Wells & Harland Williams	November 7, 2011	513
94	14	"Some Like It Hitman"	Chris McKay	Matthew Beans, Mike Fasolo, Seth Green, Breckin Meyer, Matthew Senreich, Zeb Wells & Harland Williams	November 14, 2011	514
95	15	"The Core, the Thief, His Wife, and Her Lover"	Chris McKay	Matthew Beans, Mike Fasolo, Seth Green, Breckin Meyer, Matthew Senreich, Zeb Wells & Harland Williams	November 21, 2011	515
96	16	"The Godfather of the Bride 2"	Chris McKay	Jordan Allen-Dutton, Matthew Beans, Mike Fasolo, Seth Green, Matthew Senreich, Zeb Wells & Erik Weiner	December 5, 2011	518
97	17	"The Curious Case of the Box"	Chris McKay	Jordan Allen-Dutton, Matthew Beans, Mike Fasolo, Seth Green, Matthew Senreich, Zeb Wells & Erik Weiner	December 12, 2011	517
98	18	"Fool's Goldfinger"	Chris McKay	Jordan Allen-Dutton, Matthew Beans, Mike Fasolo, Seth Green, Matthew Senreich, Zeb Wells & Erik Weiner	December 19, 2011	519
99	19	"Casablankman 2"	Chris McKay	Jordan Allen-Dutton, Matthew Beans, Mike Fasolo, Seth Green, Matthew Senreich, Zeb Wells & Erik Weiner	January 9, 2012	516
100	20	"Fight Club Paradise"	Chris McKay	Jordan Allen-Dutton, Matthew Beans, Mike Fasolo, Seth Green, Matthew Senreich, Zeb Wells & Erik Weiner	January 16, 2012	520

=== Season 6 (2012–13) ===
No. overall	No. in season	Title	Directed by	Written by	Original release date	Prod. code	US viewers (millions)
101	1	"Executed by the State"	Zeb Wells	Matthew Beans, Mike Fasolo, Jessica Gao, Seth Green, Matthew Senreich & Zeb Wells	September 17, 2012	601	1.41
102	2	"Crushed by a Steamroller on My 53rd Birthday"	Zeb Wells	Matthew Beans, Mike Fasolo, Jessica Gao, Seth Green, Matthew Senreich & Zeb Wells	September 24, 2012	602	1.23
103	3	"Punctured Jugular"	Zeb Wells	Matthew Beans, Mike Fasolo, Jessica Gao, Seth Green, Matthew Senreich & Zeb Wells	October 1, 2012	603	1.26
104	4	"Poisoned by Relatives"	Zeb Wells	Matthew Beans, Mike Fasolo, Jessica Gao, Seth Green, Matthew Senreich & Zeb Wells	October 8, 2012	604	1.25
105	5	"Hurtled from a Helicopter into a Speeding Train"	Zeb Wells	Matthew Beans, Mike Fasolo, Seth Green, Mehar Sethi, Matthew Senreich & Zeb Wells	October 15, 2012	606	1.13
106	6	"Disemboweled by an Orphan"	Zeb Wells	Matthew Beans, Mike Fasolo, Seth Green, Mehar Sethi, Matthew Senreich & Zeb Wells	October 22, 2012	605	1.63
107	7	"In Bed Surrounded by Loved Ones"	Zeb Wells	Matthew Beans, Mike Fasolo, Jessica Gao, Seth Green, Matthew Senreich & Zeb Wells	October 29, 2012	607	1.17
108	8	"Choked on Multi-Colored Scarves"	Zeb Wells	Matthew Beans, Rachel Bloom, Mike Fasolo, Seth Green, Jason Reich, Matthew Senreich & Zeb Wells	November 5, 2012	609	1.14
109	9	"Hemlock, Gin and Juice"	Zeb Wells	Matthew Beans, Mike Fasolo, Seth Green, Breckin Meyer, Jason Reich, Matthew Senreich, Erik Weiner & Zeb Wells	November 12, 2012	613	1.13
110	10	"Collateral Damage in Gang Turf War"	Zeb Wells	Matthew Beans, Rachel Bloom, Mike Fasolo, Seth Green, Jason Reich, Matthew Senreich & Zeb Wells	November 19, 2012	610	1.88
111	11	"Eviscerated Post-Coital by a Six Foot Mantis"	Zeb Wells	Matthew Beans, Mike Fasolo, Seth Green, Breckin Meyer, Jason Reich, Matthew Senreich, Erik Weiner & Zeb Wells	December 2, 2012	614	2.01
112	12	"Butchered in Burbank"	Zeb Wells	Matthew Beans, Rachel Bloom, Mike Fasolo, Seth Green, Jason Reich, Matthew Senreich & Zeb Wells	December 9, 2012	611	1.65
113	13	"Robot Chicken's ATM Christmas Special"	Zeb Wells	Matthew Beans, Mike Fasolo, Seth Green, Mehar Sethi, Matthew Senreich & Zeb Wells	December 16, 2012	608	2.17
114	14	"Papercut to Aorta"	Zeb Wells	Matthew Beans, Rachel Bloom, Mike Fasolo, Seth Green, Jason Reich, Matthew Senreich & Zeb Wells	January 6, 2013	612	1.79
115	15	"Caffeine-Induced Aneurysm"	Zeb Wells	Matthew Beans, Mike Fasolo, Seth Green, Breckin Meyer, Jason Reich, Matthew Senreich, Erik Weiner & Zeb Wells	January 13, 2013	615	1.72
116	16	"Eaten by Cats"	Zeb Wells	Matthew Beans, Mike Fasolo, Seth Green, Breckin Meyer, Jason Reich, Matthew Senreich, Erik Weiner & Zeb Wells	January 20, 2013	616	2.10
117	17	"Botched Jewel Heist"	Zeb Wells	Matthew Beans, Rachel Bloom, Mike Fasolo, Jessica Gao, Seth Green, Matthew Senreich, Tom Sheppard & Zeb Wells	January 27, 2013	617	1.71
118	18	"Robot Fight Accident"	Zeb Wells	Matthew Beans, Rachel Bloom, Mike Fasolo, Jessica Gao, Seth Green, Matthew Senreich, Tom Sheppard & Zeb Wells	February 3, 2013	618	2.07
119	19	"Choked on a Bottle Cap"	Zeb Wells	Matthew Beans, Rachel Bloom, Mike Fasolo, Jessica Gao, Seth Green, Matthew Senreich, Tom Sheppard & Zeb Wells	February 10, 2013	619	1.87
120	20	"Immortal"	Zeb Wells	Matthew Beans, Rachel Bloom, Mike Fasolo, Jessica Gao, Seth Green, Matthew Senreich, Tom Sheppard & Zeb Wells	February 17, 2013	620	2.12

=== Season 7 (2014) ===
No. overall	No. in season	Title	Directed by	Written by	Original release date	Prod. code	US viewers (millions)
121	1	"G.I. Jogurt"	Zeb Wells	Rachel Bloom, Mikey Day, Mike Fasolo, Seth Green, Matthew Senreich & Zeb Wells	April 13, 2014	701	1.91
122	2	"Link's Sausages"	Zeb Wells	Rachel Bloom, Mikey Day, Mike Fasolo, Seth Green, Matthew Senreich & Zeb Wells	April 20, 2014	702	1.59
123	3	"Secret of the Booze"	Zeb Wells	Rachel Bloom, Mikey Day, Mike Fasolo, Seth Green, Matthew Senreich & Zeb Wells	April 27, 2014	703	1.54
124	4	"Rebel Appliance"	Zeb Wells	Rachel Bloom, Mikey Day, Mike Fasolo, Seth Green, Matthew Senreich & Zeb Wells	May 4, 2014	704	1.56
125	5	"Legion of Super-Gyros"	Zeb Wells	Rachel Bloom, Mike Fasolo, Seth Green, David Phillips, Matthew Senreich & Zeb Wells	May 11, 2014	705	1.73
126	6	"El Skeletorito"	Zeb Wells	Rachel Bloom, Mike Fasolo, Seth Green, David Phillips, Matthew Senreich & Zeb Wells	May 18, 2014	706	1.61
127	7	"Snarfer Image"	Zeb Wells	Rachel Bloom, Mike Fasolo, Seth Green, David Phillips, Matthew Senreich & Zeb Wells	May 25, 2014	707	1.67
128	8	"Up, Up, and Buffet"	Zeb Wells	Rachel Bloom, Mike Fasolo, Seth Green, David Phillips, Matthew Senreich & Zeb Wells	June 1, 2014	708	1.65
129	9	"Panthropologie"	Zeb Wells	Mikey Day, Mike Fasolo, Seth Green, Brendan Hay, David Phillips, Matthew Senreich & Zeb Wells	June 8, 2014	709	1.78
130	10	"Catdog on a Stick"	Zeb Wells	Mikey Day, Mike Fasolo, Seth Green, Brendan Hay, David Phillips, Matthew Senreich & Zeb Wells	June 15, 2014	710	1.66
131	11	"Super Guitario Center"	Zeb Wells	Mikey Day, Mike Fasolo, Seth Green, Brendan Hay, David Phillips, Matthew Senreich & Zeb Wells	June 22, 2014	711	1.89
132	12	"Noidstrom Rack"	Zeb Wells	Mikey Day, Mike Fasolo, Seth Green, Brendan Hay, David Phillips & Matthew Senreich & Zeb Wells	June 29, 2014	712	1.39
133	13	"Stone Cold Steve Cold Stone"	Zeb Wells	Matthew Beans, Rachel Bloom, Mike Fasolo, Seth Green, Brendan Hay, Matthew Senreich & Zeb Wells	July 6, 2014	713	1.91
134	14	"Walking Dead Lobster"	Zeb Wells	Matthew Beans, Rachel Bloom, Mike Fasolo, Seth Green, Brendan Hay, Matthew Senreich & Zeb Wells	July 13, 2014	714	1.87
135	15	"Victoria's Secret of NIMH"	Zeb Wells	Matthew Beans, Rachel Bloom, Mike Fasolo, Seth Green, Matthew Senreich, Erik Weiner & Zeb Wells	July 20, 2014	715	2.11
136	16	"Bitch Pudding Special"	Zeb Wells	Tom Root	July 27, 2014	716	2.12
137	17	"Batman Forever 21"	Zeb Wells	Matthew Beans, Rachel Bloom, Mike Fasolo, Seth Green, Matthew Senreich, Erik Weiner & Zeb Wells	August 3, 2014	717	1.75
138	18	"The Hobbit: There and Bennigan's"	Zeb Wells	Matthew Beans, Rachel Bloom, Mike Fasolo, Seth Green, Brendan Hay, Matthew Senreich & Zeb Wells	August 10, 2014	718	1.71
139	19	"Chipotle Miserables"	Zeb Wells	Matthew Beans, Rachel Bloom, Mike Fasolo, Seth Green, Brendan Hay, Matthew Senreich & Zeb Wells	August 17, 2014	719	1.72
140	20	"Lots of Holidays (But Don't Worry Christmas is Still in There Too So Pull the Stick Out of Your Ass Fox News) Special"	Zeb Wells	Matthew Beans, Rachel Bloom, Mike Fasolo, Seth Green, Matthew Senreich, Erik Weiner & Zeb Wells	December 7, 2014	720	1.62

=== Season 8 (2015–16) ===
No. overall	No. in season	Title	Directed by	Written by	Original release date	Prod. code	US viewers (millions)
141	1	"Garbage Sushi"	Tom Sheppard	Mike Fasolo, Seth Green, Matthew Senreich, Mehar Sethi, Tom Sheppard & Brian Wysol	October 25, 2015	801	1.17
142	2	"Ants on a Hamburger"	Tom Sheppard	Mike Fasolo, Seth Green, Matthew Senreich, Mehar Sethi, Tom Sheppard & Brian Wysol	November 1, 2015	802	1.04
143	3	"Zeb and Kevin Erotic Hot Tub Canvas"	Tom Sheppard	Mike Fasolo, Seth Green, Matthew Senreich, Mehar Sethi, Tom Sheppard & Brian Wysol	November 8, 2015	803	1.14
144	4	"Cheese Puff Mountain"	Tom Sheppard	Mike Fasolo, Seth Green, Matthew Senreich, Mehar Sethi, Tom Sheppard & Brian Wysol	November 15, 2015	804	1.22
145	5	"Cake Pillow"	Tom Sheppard	Mike Fasolo, Shelby Fero, Seth Green, Joel Hurwitz, Matthew Senreich & Tom Sheppard	November 22, 2015	805	1.07
146	6	"Zero Vegetables"	Tom Sheppard	Mike Fasolo, Shelby Fero, Seth Green, Joel Hurwitz, Matthew Senreich & Tom Sheppard	December 6, 2015	806	1.11
147	7	"The Robot Chicken Christmas Special: The X-Mas United"	Tom Sheppard	Mike Fasolo, Shelby Fero, Seth Green, Joel Hurwitz, Matthew Senreich & Tom Sheppard	December 13, 2015	807	1.24
148	8	"Joel Hurwitz"	Tom Sheppard	Mike Fasolo, Shelby Fero, Seth Green, Joel Hurwitz, Matthew Senreich & Tom Sheppard	January 3, 2016	808	1.25
149	9	"Blackout Window Heat Stroke"	Tom Sheppard	Deirdre Devlin, Jeff Eckman, Mike Fasolo, Seth Green, J.T. Krul & Matthew Senreich	January 10, 2016	809	1.26
150	10	"The Unnamed One"	Tom Sheppard	Deirdre Devlin, Jeff Eckman, Mike Fasolo, Seth Green, J.T. Krul, Matthew Senreich & Tom Sheppard	January 17, 2016	810	1.57
151	11	"Fridge Smell"	Tom Sheppard	Deirdre Devlin, Jeff Eckman, Mike Fasolo, Seth Green, J.T. Krul & Matthew Senreich	March 13, 2016	811	1.23
152	12	"Western Hay Batch"	Tom Sheppard	Deirdre Devlin, Jeff Eckman, Mike Fasolo, Seth Green, J.T. Krul & Matthew Senreich	March 20, 2016	812	1.32
153	13	"Triple Hot Dog Sandwich on Wheat"	Tom Sheppard	Deirdre Devlin, Mike Fasolo, Seth Green, Joel Hurwitz, Jason Reich, & Matthew Senreich	March 27, 2016	813	1.36
154	14	"Joel Hurwitz Returns"	Tom Sheppard	Deirdre Devlin, Mike Fasolo, Seth Green, Joel Hurwitz, Jason Reich, & Matthew Senreich	April 3, 2016	814	1.14
155	15	"Hopefully Salt"	Tom Sheppard	Deirdre Devlin, Mike Fasolo, Seth Green, Joel Hurwitz, Jason Reich, & Matthew Senreich	April 10, 2016	815	1.61
156	16	"Yogurt in a Bag"	Tom Sheppard	Deirdre Devlin, Mike Fasolo, Seth Green, Joel Hurwitz, Jason Reich, & Matthew Senreich	April 17, 2016	816	1.33
157	17	"Secret of the Flushed Footlong"	Tom Sheppard	Mikey Day, Mike Fasolo, Shelby Fero, Seth Green, Matthew Senreich, Mehar Sethi & Erik Weiner	April 24, 2016	817	1.42
158	18	"Food"	Tom Sheppard	Mikey Day, Mike Fasolo, Shelby Fero, Seth Green, Matthew Senreich, Mehar Sethi & Erik Weiner	May 1, 2016	818	1.41
159	19	"Not Enough Women"	Tom Sheppard	Mikey Day, Mike Fasolo, Shelby Fero, Seth Green, Matthew Senreich, Mehar Sethi & Erik Weiner	May 8, 2016	819	1.35
160	20	"The Angelic Sounds of Mike Giggling"	Tom Sheppard	Mikey Day, Mike Fasolo, Shelby Fero, Seth Green, Matthew Senreich, Mehar Sethi & Erik Weiner	May 15, 2016	820	1.29

=== Season 9 (2017–18) ===
No. overall	No. in season	Title	Directed by	Written by	Original release date	Prod. code	US viewers (millions)
161	1	"Freshly Baked: The Robot Chicken Santa Claus Pot Cookie Freakout Special: Special Edition"	Tom Sheppard	Nick Cron-DeVico, Deirdre Devlin, Mike Fasolo, Seth Green, Tesha Kondrat, Matthew Senreich and Tom Sheppard	December 10, 2017	901	1.10
162	2	"Hey I Found Another Sock!"	Tom Sheppard	Nick Cron-DeVico, Mike Fasolo, Shelby Fero, Seth Green, Matthew Senreich and Tom Sheppard	December 17, 2017	902	1.19
163	3	"Scoot to the Gute"	Tom Sheppard	Nick Cron-DeVico, Mike Fasolo, Shelby Fero, Seth Green, Matthew Senreich and Tom Sheppard	January 7, 2018	903	1.15
164	4	"Things Look Bad for the Streepster"	Tom Sheppard	Nick Cron-DeVico, Mike Fasolo, Shelby Fero, Seth Green, Matthew Senreich and Tom Sheppard	January 14, 2018	904	1.14
165	5	"Mr. Mozzarella's Hamburger Skateboard Depot"	Tom Sheppard	Nick Cron-DeVico, Mike Fasolo, Shelby Fero, Seth Green, Matthew Senreich and Tom Sheppard	January 21, 2018	905	1.14
166	6	"Strummy Strummy Sad Sad"	Tom Sheppard	Deirdre Devlin, Mike Fasolo, Seth Green, Kiel Kennedy, Matthew Senreich and Ellory Smith	January 28, 2018	906	1.19
167	7	"3 2 1 2 333, 222, 3...66?"	Tom Sheppard	Deirdre Devlin, Mike Fasolo, Seth Green, Kiel Kennedy, Matthew Senreich and Ellory Smith	February 4, 2018	907	1.17
168	8	"We Don't See Much of That in 1940s America"	Tom Sheppard	Deirdre Devlin, Mike Fasolo, Seth Green, Kiel Kennedy, Matthew Senreich and Ellory Smith	February 11, 2018	908	1.00
169	9	"Ext. Forest - Day"	Tom Sheppard	Deirdre Devlin, Mike Fasolo, Seth Green, Kiel Kennedy, Matthew Senreich and Ellory Smith	February 18, 2018	909	1.24
170	10	"Factory Where Nuts Are Handled"	Tom Sheppard	Nick Cron-DeVico, Deirdre Devlin, Mike Fasolo, Seth Green, Tesha Kondrat, Matthew Senreich and Tom Sheppard	February 25, 2018	910	1.05
171	11	"Never Forget"	Tom Sheppard	Nick Cron-DeVico, Deirdre Devlin, Mike Fasolo, Seth Green, Tesha Kondrat, Matthew Senreich and Tom Sheppard	May 20, 2018	911	1.08
172	12	"Shall I Visit the Dinosaurs?"	Tom Sheppard	Nick Cron-DeVico, Deirdre Devlin, Mike Fasolo, Seth Green, Tesha Kondrat, Matthew Senreich and Tom Sheppard	May 27, 2018	912	1.00
173	13	"What Can You Tell Me About Butt Rashes?"	Tom Sheppard	Mike Fasolo, Seth Green, Kiel Kennedy, Michael Poisson, Matthew Senreich, Tom Sheppard and Ellory Smith	June 3, 2018	913	1.05
174	14	"Gimme That Chocolate Milk"	Tom Sheppard	Mike Fasolo, Seth Green, Kiel Kennedy, Michael Poisson, Matthew Senreich, Tom Sheppard and Ellory Smith	June 10, 2018	914	1.01
175	15	"Why Is It Wet?"	Tom Sheppard	Mike Fasolo, Seth Green, Kiel Kennedy, Michael Poisson, Matthew Senreich, Tom Sheppard and Ellory Smith	June 17, 2018	915	1.07
176	16	"Jew No. 1 Opens a Treasure Chest"	Tom Sheppard	Mike Fasolo, Seth Green, Kiel Kennedy, Michael Poisson, Matthew Senreich, Tom Sheppard and Ellory Smith	June 24, 2018	916	1.03
177	17	"He's Not Even Aiming at the Toilet"	Tom Sheppard	Hugh Davidson, Mike Fasolo, Seth Green, Michael Poisson, Matthew Senreich, Mehar Sethi, Tom Sheppard and Erik Weiner	July 1, 2018	917	0.98
178	18	"Your Mouth Is Hanging off Your Face"	Tom Sheppard and Alex Kamer	Mike Fasolo, Seth Green, Michael Poisson, Matthew Senreich, Mehar Sethi, Tom Sheppard and Erik Weiner	July 8, 2018	918	0.90
179	19	"No Wait, He Has a Cane"	Tom Sheppard	Mike Fasolo, Seth Green, Michael Poisson, Matthew Senreich, Mehar Sethi, Tom Sheppard and Erik Weiner	July 15, 2018	919	0.97
180	20	"Hi."	Tom Sheppard	Mike Fasolo, Seth Green, Michael Poisson, Matthew Senreich, Mehar Sethi, Tom Sheppard and Erik Weiner	July 22, 2018	920	1.05

=== Season 10 (2019–20) ===
No. overall	No. in season	Title	Directed by	Written by	Original release date	Prod. code	US viewers (millions)
181	1	"Ginger Hill in: Bursting Pipes"	Tom Sheppard	Mike Fasolo, Shelby Fero, Seth Green, Matthew Senreich, Tom Sheppard, Ellory Smith and Andrew Ti	September 30, 2019	1001	0.62
182	2	"Bugs Keith in: I Can't Call Heaven, Doug"	Tom Sheppard	Mike Fasolo, Seth Green, Jamie Loftus, Michael Poisson, Matthew Senreich, Tom Sheppard and Milana Vayntrub	September 30, 2019	1002	0.61
183	3	"Fila Ogden in: Maggie's Got a Full Load"	Tom Sheppard	Mike Fasolo, Seth Green, Jamie Loftus, Michael Poisson, Matthew Senreich, Tom Sheppard and Milana Vayntrub	October 7, 2019	1003	0.60
184	4	"Hermie Nursery in: Seafood Sensation"	Tom Sheppard	Mike Fasolo, Seth Green, Jamie Loftus, Michael Poisson, Matthew Senreich, Tom Sheppard and Milana Vayntrub	October 7, 2019	1004	0.55
185	5	"Garfield Stockman in: A Voice Like Wet Ham"	Tom Sheppard	Mike Fasolo, Shelby Fero, Seth Green, Matthew Senreich, Tom Sheppard, Ellory Smith and Andrew Ti	October 14, 2019	1005	0.66
186	6	"Boogie Bardstown in: No Need, I Have Coupons"	Tom Sheppard	Mike Fasolo, Shelby Fero, Seth Green, Matthew Senreich, Tom Sheppard, Ellory Smith and Andrew Ti	October 14, 2019	1006	0.61
187	7	"Snoopy Camino Lindo in: Quick and Dirty Squirrel Shot"	Tom Sheppard	Mike Fasolo, Shelby Fero, Seth Green, Matthew Senreich, Tom Sheppard, Ellory Smith and Andrew Ti	October 21, 2019	1007	0.68
188	8	"Molly Lucero in: Your Friend's Boob"	Tom Sheppard	Mike Fasolo, Shelby Fero, Seth Green, Matthew Senreich, Tom Sheppard, Ellory Smith and Andrew Ti	October 21, 2019	1008	0.64
189	9	"Spike Fraser in: Should I Happen to Back Into a Horse"	Tom Sheppard	Nick Cron-Devico, Mike Fasolo, Sasha Feiler, Seth Green, Jared Gruszecki, Michael McMillian, Breckin Meyer, Matthew Senreich and Tom Sheppard	October 28, 2019	1009	0.66
190	10	"Musya Shakhtyorov in: Honeyboogers"	Tom Sheppard	Nick Cron-DeVico, Mike Fasolo, Sasha Feiler, Seth Green, Jared Gruszecki, Michael McMillian, Breckin Meyer, Matthew Senreich and Tom Sheppard	October 28, 2019	1010	0.63
191	11	"Robot Chicken's Santa's Dead (Spoiler Alert) Holiday Murder Thing Special"	Tom Sheppard	Deirdre Devlin, Mike Fasolo, Seth Green, Jamie Loftus, Harmony McElligott, Breckin Meyer, Michael Poisson, Matthew Senreich and Tom Sheppard	December 10, 2019	1011	0.65
192	12	"Max Caenen in: Why Would He Know If His Mother's a Size Queen"	Tom Sheppard	Nick Cron-Devico, Mike Fasolo, Sasha Feiler, Seth Green, Jared Gruszecki, Michael McMillian, Breckin Meyer, Matthew Senreich and Tom Sheppard	June 29, 2020	1013	0.48
193	13	"Petless M in: Cars Are Couches of the Road"	Tom Sheppard	Deirdre Devlin, Mike Fasolo, Seth Green, Jamie Loftus, Harmony McElligott, Breckin Meyer, Michael Poisson, Matthew Senreich and Tom Sheppard	June 29, 2020	1014	0.48
194	14	"Buster Olive in: The Monkey Got Closer Overnight"	Tom Sheppard	Deirdre Devlin, Mike Fasolo, Seth Green, Jamie Loftus, Harmony McElligott, Breckin Meyer, Michael Poisson, Matthew Senreich and Tom Sheppard	July 6, 2020	1015	0.61
195	15	"Ghandi Mulholland in: Plastic Doesn't Get Cancer"	Tom Sheppard	Deirdre Devlin, Mike Fasolo, Seth Green, Jamie Loftus, Harmony McElligott, Breckin Meyer, Michael Poisson, Matthew Senreich and Tom Sheppard	July 13, 2020	1016	0.45
196	16	"Gracie Purgatory in: That's How You Get Hemorrhoids"	Tom Sheppard	Mike Fasolo, Seth Green, Jared Gruszecki, Harmony McElligott, Michael Poisson, Matthew Senreich, Tom Sheppard and Ellory Smith	July 13, 2020	1017	0.42
197	17	"Sundancer Craig in: 30% of the Way to Crying"	Tom Sheppard	Mike Fasolo, Seth Green, Jared Gruszecki, Harmony McElligott, Michael Poisson, Matthew Senreich, Tom Sheppard and Ellory Smith	July 20, 2020	1018	0.54
198	18	"Callie Greenhouse in: Fun. Sad. Epic. Tragic."	Tom Sheppard	Nick Cron-DeVico, Mike Fasolo, Sasha Feiler, Seth Green, Jared Gruszecki, Michael McMillian, Breckin Meyer, Matthew Senreich and Tom Sheppard	July 20, 2020 (Note: Aired as an April Fools sneak peek on April 1, 2020)	1012	0.37
199	19	"Babe Hollytree in: I Wish One Person Had Died"	Tom Sheppard	Mike Fasolo, Seth Green, Jared Gruszecki, Harmony McElligott, Michael Poisson, Matthew Senreich, Tom Sheppard and Ellory Smith	July 27, 2020	1019	0.40
200	20	"Endgame"	Tom Sheppard	Mike Fasolo, Seth Green, Jared Gruszecki, Harmony McElligott, Michael Poisson, Matthew Senreich, Tom Sheppard and Ellory Smith	July 27, 2020	1020	0.38

=== Season 11 (2021–22) ===
No. overall	No. in season	Title	Directed by	Written by	Original release date	Prod. code	US viewers (millions)
201	1	"May Cause a Whole Lotta Scabs"	Tom Sheppard	Maggie Cannan, Mike Fasolo, Seth Green, Zoe Katz, Matthew Senreich, Tom Sheppard, Josh Lehrman, Kyle Stegina & Erik Weiner	September 7, 2021	1101	0.43
202	2	"May Cause Light Cannibalism"	Tom Sheppard	Maggie Cannan, Mike Fasolo, Seth Green, Zoe Katz, Matthew Senreich, Tom Sheppard, Josh Lehrman, Kyle Stegina & Erik Weiner	September 8, 2021	1102	0.37
203	3	"May Cause Immaculate Conception"	Tom Sheppard	Maggie Cannan, Mike Fasolo, Seth Green, Zoe Katz, Matthew Senreich, Tom Sheppard, Josh Lehrman, Kyle Stegina & Erik Weiner	September 9, 2021	1103	0.32
204	4	"May Cause the Exact Thing You're Taking This to Avoid"	Tom Sheppard	Maggie Cannan, Mike Fasolo, Seth Green, Zoe Katz, Matthew Senreich, Tom Sheppard, Josh Lehrman, Kyle Stegina & Erik Weiner	September 10, 2021	1104	0.38
205	5	"May Cause One Year of Orange Poop"	Tom Sheppard	Maggie Cannan, Mike Fasolo, Seth Green, Jamie Loftus, Harmony McElligott, Matthew Senreich & Tom Sheppard	September 14, 2021	1105	0.38
206	6	"May Cause Random Wolf Attacks"	Tom Sheppard	Maggie Cannan, Mike Fasolo, Seth Green, Jamie Loftus, Harmony McElligott, Matthew Senreich & Tom Sheppard	September 15, 2021	1106	0.42
207	7	"May Cause Lucid Murder Dreams"	Tom Sheppard	Maggie Cannan, Mike Fasolo, Seth Green, Jamie Loftus, Harmony McElligott, Matthew Senreich & Tom Sheppard	September 16, 2021	1107	0.33
208	8	"May Cause Numb Butthole"	Tom Sheppard	Maggie Cannan, Mike Fasolo, Seth Green, Jamie Loftus, Harmony McElligott, Matthew Senreich & Tom Sheppard	September 17, 2021	1108	0.33
209	9	"May Cause the Need for Speed"	Tom Sheppard	Maggie Cannan, Chelsea Davison, Mike Fasolo, Seth Green, Noah Prestwich, Matthew Senreich & Tom Sheppard	September 21, 2021	1109	0.35
210	10	"May Cause Your Dad to Come Back With That Gallon of Milk He Went Out for 10 Years Ago"	Tom Sheppard	Maggie Cannan, Chelsea Davison, Mike Fasolo, Seth Green, Noah Prestwich, Matthew Senreich & Tom Sheppard	September 22, 2021	1110	0.36
211	11	"May Cause Episode Title to Cut Off Due to Word Lim"	Tom Sheppard	Maggie Cannan, Chelsea Davison, Mike Fasolo, Seth Green, Noah Prestwich, Matthew Senreich & Tom Sheppard	September 23, 2021	1111	0.33
212	12	"Happy Russian Deathdog Dolloween 2 U"	Tom Sheppard	Maggie Cannan, Mike Fasolo, Seth Green, Michael Poisson, Matthew Senreich, Tom Sheppard, Ellory Smith & Cody Ziglar	September 24, 2021	1112	0.32
213	13	"May Cause Indecision...Or Not"	Tom Sheppard	Maggie Cannan, Chelsea Davison, Mike Fasolo, Seth Green, Noah Prestwich, Matthew Senreich & Tom Sheppard	February 21, 2022	1113	0.34
214	14	"May Cause Bubbles Where You Don't Want 'Em"	Tom Sheppard	Maggie Cannan, Mike Fasolo, Seth Green, Michael Poisson, Matthew Senreich, Tom Sheppard, Ellory Smith & Cody Ziglar	February 28, 2022	1114	0.24
215	15	"May Cause a Squeakquel"	Tom Sheppard	Maggie Cannan, Mike Fasolo, Seth Green, Michael Poisson, Matthew Senreich, Tom Sheppard, Ellory Smith & Cody Ziglar	March 7, 2022	1115	0.29
216	16	"May Cause Involuntary Political Discharge"	Tom Sheppard	Maggie Cannan, Mike Fasolo, Seth Green, Michael Poisson, Matthew Senreich, Tom Sheppard, Ellory Smith & Cody Ziglar	March 14, 2022	1116	0.24
217	17	"May Cause an Excess of Ham"	Tom Sheppard	Maggie Cannan, Mike Fasolo, Seth Green, Zoe Katz, Noah Prestwich, Matthew Senreich, Tom Sheppard & Kevin Shinick	March 21, 2022	1117	0.26
218	18	"May Cause Internal Diarrhea"	Tom Sheppard	Maggie Cannan, Mike Fasolo, Seth Green, Zoe Katz, Noah Prestwich, Matthew Senreich, Tom Sheppard & Kevin Shinick	March 28, 2022	1118	0.22
219	19	"May Cause Weebles to Fall Down"	Tom Sheppard	Maggie Cannan, Mike Fasolo, Seth Green, Zoe Katz, Noah Prestwich, Matthew Senreich, Tom Sheppard & Kevin Shinick	April 4, 2022	1119	0.27
220	20	"May Cause Season 11 to End"	Tom Sheppard	Maggie Cannan, Mike Fasolo, Seth Green, Zoe Katz, Noah Prestwich, Matthew Senreich, Tom Sheppard & Kevin Shinick	April 11, 2022	1120	0.30

== Specials ==
Title	Directed by	Written by	Original air date	U.S. viewers (millions)
"Robot Chicken's Christmas Special"	Unknown	Mike Fasolo, Seth Green, Charles Horn, Pat McCallum, Breckin Meyer and Matthew Senreich	December 22, 2005	N/A
The special Christmas episode featured the second season short "A Very Dragon Ball Z Christmas", along with the first season shorts "Unsolved Case Files: Claus & Effect" and "Kill Bunny". There have been seven other Christmas specials to date.
"Robot Chicken: Star Wars"	Seth Green	Seth Green, Jordan Allen-Dutton, Mike Fasolo, Charles Horn, Breckin Meyer, Matthew Senreich, Hugh Sterbakov and Erik Weiner	June 17, 2007	N/A
The Emperor gets an upsetting phone call. George Lucas is saved from a mob of nerds by one helpful fan. Imperial officers learn how to survive Darth Vader in "Orientation." A commercial for Admiral Ackbar Cereal. Boba Fett has a little fun with Han in carbonite. The truth about Ponda Baba's bad day. Luke learns about the Force the hard way. President Bush is strong with the Force in "George of the Jedi." Luke and the Emperor settle things with a "yo mama" fight. Max Rebo's Greatest Hits goes on sale. Jar Jar and Anakin are together again in "The Reunion." The Star Wars saga continues in "The Empire on Ice!" George Lucas and Mark Hamill guest star.
"Robot Chicken: Star Wars Episode II"	Seth Green	Hugh Davidson, Mike Fasolo, Seth Green, Breckin Meyer, Dan Milano, Matthew Senreich, Kevin Shinick and Zeb Wells	November 16, 2008	N/A
Emperor Palpatine gets the idea to hire bounty hunters to go after the Millennium Falcon. A Stormtrooper named Gary struggles through Bring Your Daughter to Work Day. Darth Vader keeps altering his deals with Lando Calrissian.
"Robot Chicken: Star Wars Episode 2.5"	Unknown	Unknown	November 23, 2009	N/A
The best of Robot Chicken's Star Wars sketches, plus all-new ones.
"Robot Chicken: Star Wars Episode III"	Chris McKay	Matthew Beans, Hugh Davidson, Mike Fasolo, Seth Green, Geoff Johns, Breckin Meyer, Kevin Shinick, Hugh Sterbakov, Dan Milano, Matthew Senreich and Zeb Wells	December 19, 2010	N/A
The third and final installment of the Robot Chicken: Star Wars specials.
"Robot Chicken DC Comics Special"	Seth Green	Matt Beans, Michael Fasolo, Seth Green, Geoff Johns, Breckin Meyer, Matthew Senreich, Kevin Shinick and Zeb Wells	September 10, 2012	1.554
A DC Comics special, in collaboration with DC Entertainment and Warner Bros. Animation. Voice actors are Seth Green as Batman, Robin and Aquaman, Paul Reubens as the Riddler, Neil Patrick Harris as Two-Face, Alfred Molina as Lex Luthor, Nathan Fillion as the Green Lantern, Megan Fox as Lois Lane, Breckin Meyer as Superman, and Kevin Shinick as the narrator. Cast also includes Abraham Benrubi, Alex Borstein, Clare Grant, Tara Strong, Matthew Senreich, Tom Root and Zeb Wells.
"Born Again Virgin Christmas Special"	Zeb Wells	Matthew Beans, Hugh Davidson, Mike Fasolo, Seth Green, Breckin Meyer, Matthew Senreich and Zeb Wells	December 17, 2013	1.363
The origins of the Heat Miser and the Cold Miser are revealed, and Ebenezer Scrooge learns the real meaning of Christmas.
"Robot Chicken DC Comics Special 2: Villains in Paradise"	Seth Green and Zeb Wells	Matthew Beans, Hugh Davidson, Mike Fasolo, Seth Green, Geoff Johns, Breckin Meyer, Matthew Senreich, Kevin Shinick and Zeb Wells	April 6, 2014	1.860
The sequel to the Robot Chicken DC Comics Special that focuses more on the Legion of Doom.
"Robot Chicken DC Comics Special III: Magical Friendship"	Tom Sheppard and Zeb Wells	Hugh Davidson, Mike Fasolo, Seth Green, Geoff Johns, J.T. Krul, Breckin Meyer, Matthew Senreich, Tom Sheppard and Kevin Shinick	October 18, 2015	1.149
The third and final special in the Robot Chicken DC Comics Specials series which focuses on Superman and Batman's friendship.
"The Robot Chicken Walking Dead Special: Look Who's Walking"	Tom Sheppard	Hugh Davidson, Mike Fasolo, Scott M. Gimple, Seth Green, Robert Kirkman, J.T. Krul, Breckin Meyer, Matthew Senreich, Tom Sheppard, Erik Weiner and Zeb Wells	October 9, 2017	1.024
The tale of Rick Grimes and his walker-battling friends gets a twisted retelling when the Robot Chicken Nerd visits the Walking Dead Museum and meets an aging survivor.
"The Bleepin' Robot Chicken Archie Comics Special"	Tom Sheppard	Maggie Cannan, Hugh Davidson, Mike Fasolo, Seth Green, Breckin Meyer, Matthew Senreich, Tom Sheppard, Ellory Smith and Milana Vayntrub	May 24, 2021	0.370
In the half-hour animated comedy, Archie faces the action-packed return of Josie and the Pussycats from outer space to Riverdale. Plus, it features the origin story of Archie Andrews as only the Robot Chicken writers can tell it!
"The Robot Chicken Self-Discovery Special"	John Harvatine IV, Eric Towner	Maggie Cannan, Hugh Davidson, Mike Fasolo, Seth Green, Zoe Katz, Breckin Meyer, Matthew Senreich and Ellory Smith	July 20, 2025	N/A
The Nerd embarks on a journey of self-discovery the American way - by going on reality shows from Discovery-owned channels. Will he find a 90 Day Fiancé... or end up as Shark Week chum?
"The Robot Chicken Adult Swim Special"	John Harvatine IV	Maggie Cannan, Mike Fasolo, Seth Green, Breckin Meyer, Matthew Senreich, Tom Sheppard, Ellory Smith, Emma Taylor and Rylee White	August 30, 2026	N/A
The iconic Adult Swim characters board a cruise ship to celebrate the late-night programming block’s 25th anniversary. However, the cruise turns into a disaster, potentially spelling a watery doom for all aboard. Note: This special was dedicated to George Lowe.
