= Eric Swinderman =

American film director (born 1976)

Eric Swinderman (born July 8, 1976) is an American writer, director, and producer. He was the writer and director of the independent dark comedy The Enormity of Life starring former The Walking Dead star Emily Kinney, Breckin Meyer of Clueless fame and Giselle Eisenberg (The Wolf of Wall Street, Life in Pieces).

== Early life ==
Swinderman was born in Dover, Ohio, and grew up in New Philadelphia, Ohio. A graduate of Cleveland State University's School of Communication, he studied film and television production.

== Career ==
In 2012, Swinderman produced Made in Cleveland, an anthology of 11 short films by multiple different Cleveland directors, notably Jamie Babbit and her spouse Karey Dornetto. The film stars Busy Philipps and Gillian Jacobs. The film opened in limited theatrical release to wide critical acclaim.

In 2018, Swinderman wrote and directed the independent film The Enormity of Life, starring Breckin Meyer and Emily Kinney. It was an official selection in the Beverly Hills Film Festival and was the opening night film in the Paris Art and Movie Awards where it was nominated for Best Feature, Best Actor (Breckin Meyer, winner) and Best Original Song (Don't Walk Away from Me by By Light We Loom.) The film also features music from Avett Brothers and Kodaline, and is currently represented by Bayview Entertainment.
