= Devil May Care (TV series) =

Animated television series

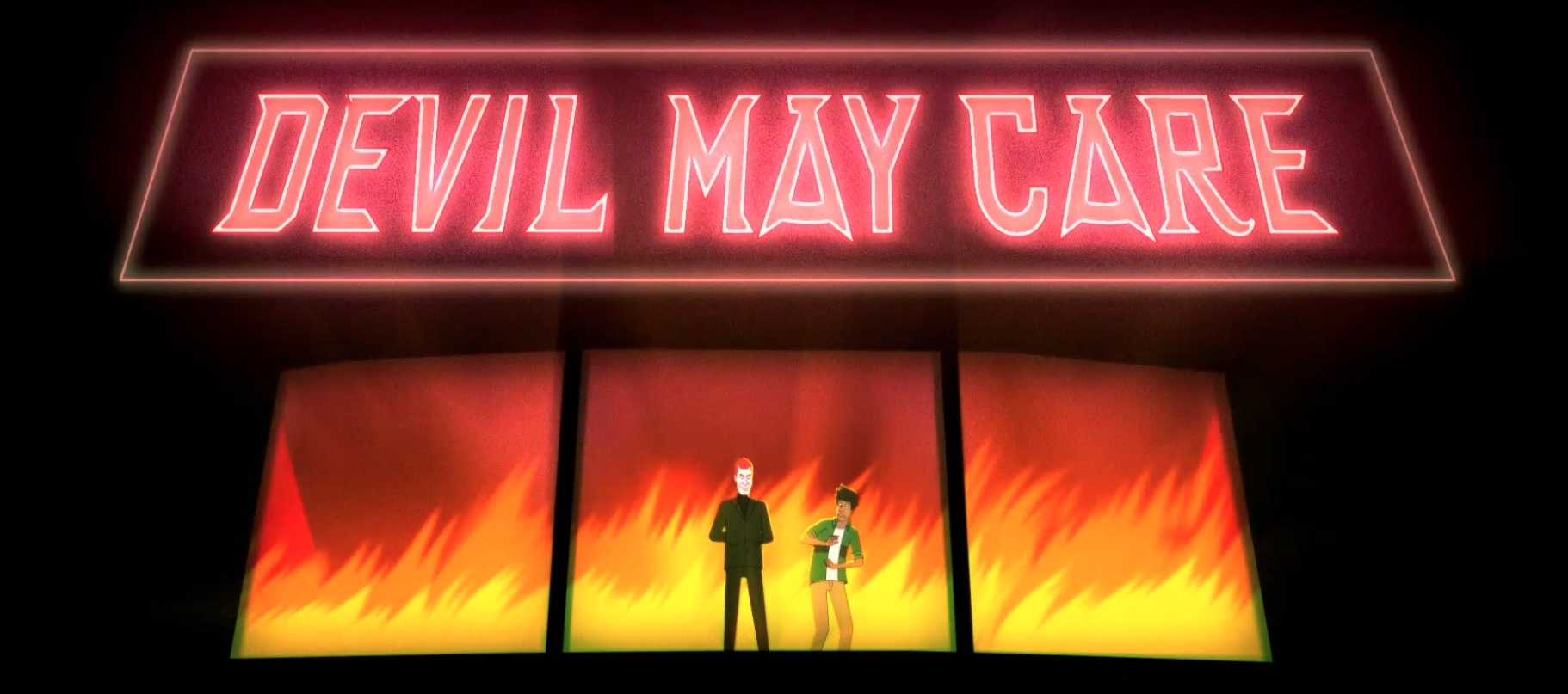
- Genre: Adult animation Animated sitcom
- Created by: Douglas Goldstein
- Written by: Douglas Goldstein
- Directed by: Gary Ye; Thalia Tomlinson
- Starring: Alan Tudyk; Asif Ali; Pamela Adlon; Stephanie Beatriz; Fred Tatasciore
- Country of origin: United States
- Original language: English
- No. of seasons: 1
- No. of episodes: 7

Production
- Executive producers: Douglas Goldstein; Amanda Miller; Chris Prynoski; Shannon Prynoski; Ben Kalina
- Producer: Jennifer Ray
- Running time: 11 minutes
- Production companies: Titmouse; Psyop

Original release
- Network: SyFy
- Release: February 6 – March 31, 2021

Devil May Care is an American adult animated comedy television series created by Emmy Award winner Douglas Goldstein (Robot Chicken) and starring Alan Tudyk and Asif Ali. It follows life in a newly gentrified and urban Hell, and the evolving friendship between Devil and his freshly-arrived social media manager, Beans. The first season of the series, consisting of seven 11-minute episodes, premiered on SyFy's late night programming block TZGZ on February 6, 2021.

== Premise ==
Devil May Care introduces a version of Hell where it is not populated by evil, but by anything in the universe God thought was too annoying to spend eternity with in Heaven. Devil has no idea of that true purpose of Hell, and thinks he's just supposed to make the place run smoothly. He's gentrified Hell and tries to keep people happy. Enter Beans, a young social media manager, who is assigned to be Devil's assistant. Devil is thrilled to introduce social media to Hell and puts Beans to work. The show is about Beans settling into Hell, Devil trying to make Hell awesome, and both of them juggling their personal lives with work.

== Cast ==
=== Main ===
- Devil (voiced by Alan Tudyk) is an excitable, trusting and industrious out-of-the-box thinking supernatural being who rules over Hell like a hyperactive Steve Jobs. His goal is to get Hell into the best state possible so that God will finally, after all these millennia, give him a good performance review.
- Zachary "Beans" Bean (voiced by Asif Ali) is a Gen-Z kid who has no idea why he's in Hell. Easy to scare and eager to please, Beans does his best to explain social media to Devil and his staff while trying to stay sane.

=== Supporting ===
- Regina (voiced by Pamela Adlon) is one of the original Succubi of Hell who married Devil in hopes she could influence him to change Hell back to the lava-and-torture look of the old days. They have two children together.
- President McKinley (voiced by Fred Tatasciore) is the hard-ass President of the United States who was in office during the Spanish-American War. That makes him the perfect guy to perform any duty Devil himself doesn't want to do. Is referred to as "The Devil's Advocate" and can't stand Devil's spontaneous ways.
- Gloria (voiced by Stephanie Beatriz) is Hell's Head Demon. Like the superintendent of an old apartment building, she knows how everything works and finds it all a bit boring. Over the years, she has seen and done everything there is to see and do.

=== Recurring ===
- Calvin (voiced by Phil LaMarr) is Devil and Regina's young son. He may look demonic, but he's very sweet.
- Charlotte (voiced by Pamela Adlon) is Devil and Regina's young daughter. She may look sweet, but she's actually very demonic.
- Coma (voiced by Grey Griffin) is Devil's secretary who is a good worker, keeps to herself, and is a bit creepy since she's all hair.

=== Guest ===
- Tichina Arnold as Jezebeth
- Lewis Black as Atheist Steve
- Richard Kind as Meteorologist Smith
- Maurice LaMarche as Peter
- Lindsay Lohan as Ziva
- Jack McBrayer as God

== Episodes ==
No. overall	No. in season	Title	Directed by	Written by	Original release date	Viewers (millions)
1	1	"The New Guy"	Gary Ye	Douglas Goldstein	February 6, 2021	0.164
"Hell's newest resident becomes Devil's social media manager, and nothing will ever be the same."
2	2	"The Influencer"	Gary Ye	Douglas Goldstein	February 13, 2021	0.126
"The denizens of Hell get addicted to McKinley's viral videos, and nothing will ever be the same."
3	3	"The Atheist"	Thalia Tomlinson	Douglas Goldstein	February 20, 2021	N/A
"Devil is trapped on Earth by a summoning gone wrong, and nothing will ever be the same." Guest-starring Lewis Black as Atheist Steve.
4	4	"The Shipment"	Gary Ye	Douglas Goldstein	February 27, 2021	0.178
"The secret origins of Devil and Hell are revealed, and nothing will ever be the same." Guest-starring Jack McBrayer as God.
5	5	"The Sisters"	Thalia Tomlinson	Mike Fasolo	March 6, 2021	0.164
"Regina's life crisis can only be solved by succubus shenanigans, and nothing will ever be the same." Guest-starring Tichina Arnold as Regina's sister Jezebeth.
6	6	"The Date"	Gary Ye	Jared Gruszecki	March 24, 2021	0.195
"Devil forces Beans to seek out a girlfriend in Hell, and nothing will ever be the same." Guest-starring Lindsay Lohan as Bean's date Ziva.
7	7	"The Freeze"	Thalia Tomlinson	Douglas Goldstein	March 31, 2021	0.311
"Hell finally freezes over when Climate Change runs amok, and nothing will ever be the same." Guest-starring Richard Kind as Meteorologist Smith.

== Reception ==
The series received positive critical reception with a 100% fresh rating from Rotten Tomatoes. The A.V. Club praised the "endearing visual gags, witty banter, and smart commentary on the ways that our obsession with social media is basically hell on earth." Decider referred to it as "a funny commentary on social media, religion and people's views of hell." Common Sense Media warned parents that Devil May Care is "a violent cartoon riddled with crass and lewd humor that is not appropriate for kids" while at the same time reminding that adults "who are fans of contemptuous comedy may enjoy the jokes poking fun at millennial and Gen Z culture."
