= Robot Chicken: Star Wars Episode III =

- DVD cover
- Genre: Crossover; Sci-fi; Action
- Created by: Seth Green; Matthew Senreich
- Based on: Star Wars by George Lucas
- Written by: Matthew Beans; Hugh Davidson; Mike Fasolo; Doug Goldstein; Seth Green; Geoff Johns; Breckin Meyer; Dan Milano; Tom Root; Matthew Senreich; Kevin Shinick; Hugh Sterbakov; Zeb Wells
- Directed by: Chris McKay; Seth Green; (uncredited)
- Starring: Seth Green; Abraham Benrubi; Bob Bergen; Ahmed Best; Rachael Leigh Cook; Anthony Daniels; Hugh Davidson; Zac Efron; Eden Espinosa; Donald Faison; Keith Ferguson; Donald Glover; Mike Henry; Tom Kane; Seth MacFarlane; Breckin Meyer; Dan Milano; Raymond Ochoa; Adrianne Palicki; Matthew Senreich; Zeb Wells; Billy Dee Williams
- Theme music composer: Les Claypool
- Composer: Shawn Patterson
- Country of origin: United States
- Original language: English

Production
- Executive producers: Seth Green; Matthew Senreich
- Producers: Alex Bulkley; Corey Campodonico
- Cinematography: Christopher Covel
- Editor: Matt Mariska
- Running time: 45 minutes
- Production companies: Lucasfilm; Sony Pictures Digital; Stoopid Monkey; ShadowMachine Films

Original release
- Network: Adult Swim
- Release: December 19, 2010

Related
- "Robot Chicken: Star Wars Episode II"; "Robot Chicken DC Comics Special"

"Robot Chicken: Star Wars Episode III" is a 2010 episode special of the television comedy series Robot Chicken, and the third and final installment in the Annie Award-winning and Emmy-nominated Robot Chicken: Star Wars trilogy. It premiered on Cartoon Network's Adult Swim programming block on December 19, 2010. The special is 45 minutes long, as opposed to the usual 11-minute Robot Chicken runtime and the 21-minute runtime of the two previous Star Wars specials. It is the final Robot Chicken: Star Wars special.

== Synopsis ==
Unlike the previous installments in the satirical trilogy, Episode III tells a more cohesive chronological tale stretching from before the events of Star Wars: Episode I – The Phantom Menace to after Return of the Jedi. Emperor Palpatine, voiced by Seth MacFarlane, acts as a narrator - chronicling his own rise to power, the questionable wisdom of his selection of Anakin Skywalker as an apprentice, the extermination of the Jedi, and routine life aboard the Death Star. Several skits feature Boba Fett, voiced by Breckin Meyer (who was nominated for an Emmy for his writing work on the first Robot Chicken: Star Wars), including his fall into and time spent in the Sarlacc pit. Other skits feature more minor characters like Gary the Stormtrooper, Max Rebo, Yarael Poof, and Orrimaarko (also known as "Prune Face") - none of whom had speaking roles in any of the Star Wars films.

=== List of sketches ===
1. The Emperor's Back - Just as Palpatine is thrown down the reactor shaft by Darth Vader, he reminisces on his mistakes which have led up to this, including his anti-Gungan activities that led to his political career in the Galactic Senate and his bad choices for apprentices.
2. Opening sequence, redone from the previous specials. The Mad Scientist (Emperor Palpatine) saves the Robot Chicken (Darth Vader) from the volcanic planet of Mustafar and rebuilds it before forcing it to watch the show.
3. This is Pod Racing - After destroying the droid control ship, little Anakin Skywalker jubilates until the radio operators wonder why they hear a little girl on their comm channel.
4. Yarael Poof, pt. 1 - Despite being a member of the Jedi Council, Jedi Master Yarael Poof is constantly ignored and even gets sent out for another pizza fetching job.
5. Romantic Dinner - During her dinner with Anakin in her Naboo summer palace, Padmé suddenly gets all action-nerdy.
6. Rave on Genosia - An unusual character suddenly pops up in the midst of the Geonosis arena battle.
7. Non-Sexual Matters - Anakin tries to talk to Padmé about his feelings for her, but Padmé ends up letting her hair down, performing yoga, stripping down into her bikini to wax R2-D2, and then releasing water over herself, sexually tormenting Anakin. Despite all this, she tells him that she's not getting into this with him.
8. Catch, Dad - Young Boba Fett attempts to continue a normal kid's life with his father's last memento as a replacement for his presence.
9. My Face is on Fire - After making Anakin into Darth Vader, Anakin tells Palpatine that while he was fighting Mace Windu, some of his Force lightning bounced off his lightsaber and hit him in the face, causing his face to burn and steam.
10. Yarael Poof, pt. 2 - Master Poof returns with the pizza to find the Jedi Temple raided, and decides to make up for lost opportunities on his time with the council by mocking Yoda and the other council members before he is forced to flee.
11. Darth Matt - After rescuing Vader from the lava on Mustafar, Palpatine mockingly calls him "Darth Matt" while Vader tries to make some suggestions about his armor. After getting into his armor, Darth Vader dances around the Death Star until he has to use the bathroom. Still unfamiliar with his new suit, he ends up entangled in a plethora of operating errors and his hand stuck in the toilet, causing him to cry out in despair.
12. Orders 1-65 - When Darth Vader asks Palpatine about the emergency orders coming before Order 66, Palpatine provides a less-than comprehensive listing of orders on how to make life miserable for anyone else in Star Wars. Set to the early 19th century folk song 'Turkey in the Straw'.
13. Self-Motivation - Ben Kenobi uses the Jedi mind trick on himself in the mirror to make him more confident in picking up women.
14. Hold the Elevator - Emperor Palpatine is beaten to the Death Star elevator by Gary the Stormtrooper, who refuses to hold the door. Unwilling to take an elevator occupied by several Quarren, Palpatine settles on taking the escalator. While going up the escalator, Palpatine keeps passing stormtroopers, who salute him, to Palpatine's growing annoyance.
15. Fire Insurance - A salesman tries to sell fire insurance to Beru Lars, who quickly rejects him and slams the door on him.
16. Yarael Poof, pt. 3 - Master Poof, now in disguise as a mustachioed food server at the Death Star cafeteria, becomes nervous when Palpatine and Darth Vader go through the lunch line.
17. Driving the Death Star - When the Death Star pilot has to go to the bathroom, he has Gary the Stormtrooper take over the Death Star, but when they near a planet, Gary hits the brakes, causing a series of unfortunate events around the Death Star. Gary eventually stops the Death Star before it crushes his daughter's elementary school.
18. Most Interesting Bounty Hunter in the Galaxy - Parody of "The Most Interesting Man in the World" commercials, Boba Fett is the "Most Interesting Bounty Hunter in the Galaxy".
19. Si, C-3PO - As Owen Lars buys C-3PO from the Jawas, he asks him about the only language out of over 6 million whose learning has given C-3PO severe trauma: Spanish.
20. Bad Motivator - Luke Skywalker tries to get the Lars' R5-D4 unit off of the couch to do its chores, but it refuses and makes up excuses; Luke tells Owen that the droid's got a "bad motivator".
21. Storm Troopers at the Moisture Farm - Gary and a stormtrooper named Carl visit Owen and Beru Lars' home to search for C-3PO and R2-D2, but they end up inviting them in. While Gary goes to the bathroom, he accidentally starts a fire and hurriedly rushes out of the door with Carl, leaving Owen and Beru to burn to death.
22. Sand Crawler - After Owen and Beru die, Ben Kenobi cheers up Luke by convincing him to take the Jawas' Sand Crawler for a joyride.
23. They'll Be Back - An innocent and desperate Death Star prisoner keeps his hopes for freedom high, even though Luke, Han, and Leia have no idea that he exists.
24. TIE Pilots - At a movie theater, TIE Fighter Pilots act obnoxious and disrupt the movie, much to the stormtroopers' annoyance.
25. Mr. Bob A. Feet - A mailman delivers a package to Boba Fett, but instead gets his name wrong.
26. They Came Back! - The Death Star prisoner's hopes for freedom are revived when the Rebels attack the Death Star until Luke blows it up.
27. Vader's in Trouble - Darth Vader's TIE Fighter spins out of control, causing Vader's ship to malfunction while Gary the Stormtrooper watches.
28. I'll See YOU in Hell - The rebel whom Han told "I'll see you in hell" tries to come up with a clever comeback.
29. Obi-Tauntaun - Maurice the dying Tauntaun gets a visit from the wrong ghostly visitor.
30. THX-1138 - IG-88's cousin, THX-1138's introduction isn't well received by the bounty hunter community.
31. Chewie's Family - Han visits Chewbacca's family, only to discover that they wear clothes and that Chewie's been naked all along.
32. Tested on Dagobah - Parody of the cave scene in The Empire Strikes Back. When Luke goes in the cave and defeats the Darth Vader imposter, Yoda berates him for slicing its head off and that the test was made to make him think.
33. Lego Star Wars - In a Lego sketch, Lando Calrissian learns the advantages of a head mounted on backwards.
34. Fett Defeated - Parody of the Sarlaac Pit battle, a new side of the Weequay Skiff Guard is revealed along with the true causes for Boba Fett's failure and Jabba the Hutt's death.
35. One-Armed Wampa - When Luke makes a stop at a gas station, he spots the One-Armed Wampa whose arm he sliced off and watches as it struggles to adjust to having one arm. Luke hides from it, and when the Wampa gets back in its ship, it spots Luke.
36. Fett's Back From the Dead - Boba Fett strangely appears victorious at the battle at the Sarlaac Pit, only to find out it was a dream and that he's still stuck in the Sarlaac.
37. Rescuing Luke - When Lando tries to help Luke into the Millennium Falcon, Luke unknowingly mutters that he's about to be mugged, which offends Lando, causing him to get back into the Falcon and fly off.
38. Max Rebo's Got a Gig - After Jabba's sail barge is destroyed, Max Rebo sets off across the desert, determined to make it to his gig tonight, only to find another band playing.
39. Prune Face! - During the planning session for the attack on the second Death Star, Orrimaarko a.k.a. Prune Face introduces himself to the Rebel Alliance in an over-glorifying light, until he admits he's just the repair man.
40. Bathtime with Ackbar - Lost in the desert, Chewbacca slowly starts considering eating Admiral Ackbar.
41. Speeder Accident - Gary the Stormtrooper accidentally hits an Ewok with his speeder and he tries to put it out of its misery, but ends up making things worse for the pained creature. By the time he finally kills it and ends its suffering, he is spotted by numerous Ewoks; Gary makes up a poor excuse and flees.
42. Inner Monologues - Palpatine tortures Luke with the Force lightning while Darth Vader watches and each one of them entertains their own distracted thoughts.
43. Palpatine's Last Moments - Palpatine finally realizes the true meaning of life and tries to make the best of his situation before he slams into the Millennium Falcon's windshield and ends up a frozen, naked corpse in space.
44. Happy SW3 - After the Battle of Endor - The credits are interrupted when Darth Vader wakes up very much alive on his burning funeral pyre. Chewbacca regains the use of his proper language, along with the victory celebration from the perspective of Yoda, Anakin, and Obi-Wan's Force Ghosts.
45. Episode VII: Boba on the Hunt - In the post-credits scene, Boba Fett and the Weequay Skiff Guard get barfed out of the Sarlaac and take over Jabba's palace band.

== Cast ==
Notable cast members include Mike Henry as Yaddle, Donald Glover as Mace Windu, Billy Dee Williams as Lando Calrissian, Anthony Daniels as C-3PO, Ahmed Best as Jar Jar Binks and the normal cast of Seth Green, Breckin Meyer, Seth MacFarlane, Abraham Benrubi, Bob Bergen, Donald Faison, Rachael Leigh Cook, Zac Efron, Eden Espinosa, Dan Milano and Tom Kane.

== Reception ==
The special was given a 9.5/10 by IGN and a 8.1/10 by IMDb reviewers. It was released on DVD and Blu-ray Disc on July 12, 2011.
