= Sausage fest =

Sausage fest may refer to:

- "Sausage fest", a derisive term for a male gender imbalance
- "Sausage Fest", an episode of Robot Chicken

== See also ==
- Sausage market, a German-American Wurst mart
- Sausage Party, a 2016 comedy film
