= Robin Swoboda =

American TV news anchor and actress

- Born: Robin Lynn Swoboda; December 30, 1958 (age 67); St. Joseph, Missouri, U.S.
- Occupations: TV news anchor Actress; Radio commentator
- Years active: 1982-present
- Spouse: Bryan Wagner (m. 1991; div. 2015)
- Children: 3

Robin Swoboda (born December 30, 1958) is an American television news anchor, talk show host, and actress in Cleveland, Ohio, best known for her career on various television and radio stations primarily in Cleveland, as well as hosting national television programs.

== Bio and career ==
=== Radio and TV ===
A St. Joseph, Missouri, native, Swoboda attended and graduated from Missouri Western State College. In 1981, she received her first job as a television news anchor at WQAD-TV in Moline, Illinois.

In the early 1980s, Swoboda (under the name Robin Cole) worked as an anchor and reporter for then-CBS affiliate WTVJ channel 4 (now NBC O&O and channel 6) in Miami, Florida. She then moved to Cleveland in 1986, and using her real name, became a co-anchor for then CBS affiliate WJW-TV 8 alongside longtime station mainstays Tim Taylor, Dick Goddard, and Casey Coleman.

This came at a time when WJW was the top-rated newscast in Cleveland, and with that Swoboda became a very popular personality, and while still with WJW in 1989, she became the co-host with Ahmad Rashad on the nationally syndicated sports interview program InSport. InSport was short lived, and Swoboda would remain on WJW until 1991, electing to leave Cleveland when her husband Bryan Wagner was cut from the Cleveland Browns (where he was the punter) and signed with the New England Patriots.

After leaving WJW, Swoboda was named as co-host of Cover to Cover (using her married name of Robin Wagner, alongside Gayle King) which was aired nationally by NBC. During that time Swoboda also had a stint as a celebrity square on Hollywood Squares.

Cover to Cover would be cancelled after 13 weeks, and after a brief stint in Kansas City, Missouri, as a news anchor, Swoboda returned to Cleveland in 1996 and once again was a co-anchor of the 6 p.m. newscast on WJW (by this time now a Fox affiliate), briefly reuniting her with Taylor, Goddard, and Coleman and reforming the popular and highly rated news team from the late 1980s. Swoboda left in 1998 to go over to Cleveland ABC affiliate WEWS channel 5 to become host of the station's long running Morning Exchange. MX was cancelled in 1999, and Swoboda then became co-anchor of channel 5's 11 p.m. newscast alongside Ted Henry.

Swoboda then left the broadcasting business altogether in 2000, to spend more time with her family. Two years later, she returned to the Cleveland media scene, this time in radio, as she became the co-host for the morning show on Cleveland Christian contemporary station WFHM-FM "95.5 The Fish". She left that job in 2005, and two years after that, returned for a third stint at WJW, this time hosting her own morning talk show originally titled That's Life, and later changed to The Robin Swoboda Show. Swoboda would win a local Emmy Award for her stint as host of her self-titled show in 2010.

In January 2011, Swoboda left WJW again after a disagreement with station management over the direction of her show. Two months later, she was named co-anchor of the 7 p.m. newscast on Cleveland NBC affiliate WKYC channel 3, where she worked until February 28, 2014.

In July 2014, Swoboda began doing one-minute commentaries for WFHM (where she was previously morning host), and sister talk station WHK AM 1420.

=== Film ===
Swoboda has also had roles in a pair of motion pictures, partly due to the films being shot in Cleveland - a bit part in the blockbuster The Avengers in 2012, and a bigger role in the independent film Made in Cleveland in 2013.

== Personal life ==
Swoboda became a born again Christian in 1989, and married her former husband, former NFL punter and placekicker Bryan Wagner in 1991; they divorced in 2015, and now she currently lives with their now grown-up children (sons Matthew and William, daughter Hallie) in Medina, Ohio.

== Awards and honors ==
- 1995 Ohio Broadcasters Hall of Fame inductee
- 2009 Lower Great Lakes Emmy Awards recipient - On Camera Talent (Performer/Host/Narrator)
- 2012 Cleveland Association of Broadcasters Excellence in Television Award recipient
