= This Is War (Emily Kinney album) =

Studio album by Emily Kinney
- Released: 2 October 2015
- Genres: Pop, folk, indie pop
- Length: 31:47
- Label: Em-K Music
- Producer: Caleb Shreve

Emily Kinney chronology
Expired Love (2014)	This Is War (2015)	Back On Love (2016)

Singles from This Is War
- 1. "This Is War" Released: 28 April 2015; 2. "Molly" Released: 26 April 2016

This Is War is the debut studio album by American actress and singer-songwriter Emily Kinney, and counts as her third major release overall following the EPs Blue Toothbrush and Expired Love and its subsequent re-release. The album was released independently on 2 October 2015 and a single of the same name was released from the album on 28 April 2015. Its second single "Molly" was released after the album's release on April 26, 2016.

== Singles ==
"This Is War", the title track of the album was released as the lead single from the album on April 28, 2015.

"Molly" the second single from "This Is War" was released as the second single from the album on April 26, 2016. Its music video was released on the same date.

== Critical reception ==
"This Is War" received very positive reviews from critics, who praised its songwriting.

Rachel Freitas for Musix Existence gave "This Is War" a positive review stating: "Whimsical, and with a fighting but gentle spirit, This is War, is a pick me up on a cloudy day. The type of album with such a positive attitude that one cannot help but feel happier after listening to it." Katja Wahl, from The Clipper called the album "stellar", stating: "It takes a moment, but if you dissect her lyrics it makes you realize “huh, she gets this.” Wahl gave the album five out of five stars. Vexing Circumstance called the album "perfect", stating: "This Is War is the best of pop music. It’s what all pop music should be, sweet and fierce and fun."

== Promotion ==
A lyric video for the song "Mess" was released on September 11th, 2015.

A music video for the title track “This Is War” was released on May 27th, 2015.

A music video for the song “Molly” was released on April 26th, 2016.

In 2015, she embarked on the ‘This Is War Tour’ in promotion of the album.

== Track listing ==
All songs written by Emily Kinney.

1. "This Is War" - 3:31
2. "Birthday Cake" - 3:32
3. "Mess" - 3:10
4. "Berkeley's Breathing" - 3:06
5. "Michael" - 2:52
6. "Never Leave LA" - 2:53
7. "Crash and Burn" - 3:02
8. "Molly" - 2:40
9. "Last Chance" - 3:17
10. "Weapons" - 3:41

== Personnel ==
Personal adapted from booklet credits from album CD.

- Emily Kinney - lead vocals, guitar, percussion, glockenspiel
- Elliot Jacobson - drums, percussion
- Simon Kafka - guitar, slide guitar, mandolin
- Caleb Shreve - bass, programming, percussion
- Jon Siebels - guitar
- Josh Sadlier-Brown - Fender Rhodes
- Yuri Hart - cello
