= Made in Cleveland =

2013 anthology film

- Theatrical release poster
- Produced by: Mark Pengryn; Ashley Abraham; Eric Swinderman; Amy Swinderman
- Starring: Busy Philipps, Gillian Jacobs, Leon Bibb
- Cinematography: Zach Christy; Patrick Antone
- Edited by: Matt Pallotta; Eric Swinderman; Sage O'Bryant
- Music by: Isaac Nicholas; Bethesda
- Production companies: 1031 Films, LLC
- Distributed by: Striped Entertainment
- Release date: June 13, 2013
- Running time: 113 minutes
- Country: United States
- Languages: English; Yiddish

Made in Cleveland (formerly titled Cleveland, I Love You) is a 2013 anthology film consisting of 11 short films featuring the work of seven different directors and five screenwriters. The short films all relate in some way to the subject of life, love, and the pursuit of happiness in Cleveland, Ohio. The film was written, directed, produced largely by people with connections to Cleveland, and it stars a cast and crew consisting predominantly of current or former Clevelanders, including Shaker Heights native Jamie Babbit and Cleveland natives Eric Swinderman and Robert C. Banks, Jr. The film stars an ensemble cast, among them Busy Philipps, Gillian Jacobs, George Roth, Jeffrey Grover, Robin Swoboda, Leon Bibb, Brendan Potter, Derek Koger, Linda Ryan, Robbie Barnes, Charlie Martini, and others. Made in Cleveland premiered June 13, 2013 at the historic Atlas Cinemas Lakeshore 7 theater in Euclid, Ohio. It opened June 21 in five Atlas Cinemas theaters in Ohio, and was well received in the local press.

== Cast and crew ==
Following is the full cast and crew of eleven segments of Cleveland, I Love You

Segment	Director	Writer	Actors
Corned Beef & Mamie O'Rourke	Eric Swinderman	Eric Swinderman	George Roth as Saul; Steve Ryan as Harry; Valerie Mayen as Mamie
Fucking Cleveland	Jamie Babbit	Karey Dornetto	Busy Philipps as Shannon; Gillian Jacobs as Martha
Learning to Fly	Eric Swinderman	Eric Swinderman	James McGilbray as Dr. Monroe; Charlie Martini as Daryl; Victor Kuehn as Steven; Nancy Telzerow as Nancy
Friday Night	Tony Hartman	Tony Hartman	Christian Prentice as Sean; Mark Mazzocoo as Shawn; Mary Faktor as Traci; Stefanie Satchik as Linda; Jason Botsford as Andy
Love of Country	Amy Tankersley Swinderman	Robert Mason	Leon Bibb as Thomas; Imani Khiry as Randall; Brendan Potter as Sgt. Lennox
Book of Love	Robert Banks	Robert Mason	Robbie Barnes as Girl; Patrick Antone as Guy
Forbidden Love	Cigdem Slankard	Eric Swinderman	Jessy Leigh as Naveen; Dan Sanek as Alex; Troy Field as Danielle; Rollin Michael as Mr. Stubbins
Domestic Disputes	Sage O'Bryant	Eric Swinderman	Derek Koger as Paul; Joe Zamora as Jason; Sabrina McPherson as Sheree; Jimmie Lee Williams as Antwon
Wingmen	Tony Hartman	Tony Hartman	Jackson Biesecker as Mike; Michael Goulis as Tim; Andrea Richardson as Sherry and introducing Mikkayla Renee Flores as Sherry's friend
Love Interrupted	Sage O'Bryant	Eric Swinderman	Robin Swoboda as Janice; Jeffrey Grover as Donnie; Michael Cipiti as Tony
Love Thy Neighbor	Eric Swinderman	Dan Sanek	Linda Ryan as Evelyn; Danielle Temelkoff as Tom
