= Blue State (film) =

2007 Canadian/American romantic comedy film by Marshall Lewy

- Canadian DVD cover
- Directed by: Marshall Lewy
- Written by: Marshall Lewy
- Produced by: Kyle Irving; Andrew Paquin; Anna Paquin
- Starring: Breckin Meyer; Anna Paquin
- Cinematography: Phil Parmet
- Edited by: Adam Stein
- Production companies: Paquin Films; Eagle Vision
- Distributed by: Metro-Goldwyn-Mayer
- Release date: April 27, 2007 (Tribeca)
- Countries: United States; Canada
- Language: English
- Budget: $1 million (estimated)

Blue State is a 2007 Canadian/American romantic comedy film directed by Marshall Lewy and starring Breckin Meyer and Anna Paquin (who was also the film's executive producer). The film was the first effort of Paquin in an executive role.

== Plot ==
John Logue, a dedicated John Kerry campaigner in the 2004 election, makes a drunken campaign vow to move to Canada if George W. Bush is re-elected. When Bush indeed wins again, John finds his employer and his friends took his public vow seriously and he can not help but stay true to his word. He meets Chloe Hamon, a reader of his blog, who wants to accompany him to Canada. On his way, they visit John's parents who are upset about his liberal views because his father is an inveterate Republican supporter. Moreover, John's brother is a soldier who fought in the Iraq War. Later, close to the Canada–United States border, Chloe reveals to John that she is a deserter who was in Iraq as a soldier and is supposed to return there.

John insists on taking Chloe to Canada although he then risks getting in trouble should she get arrested. In Canada, they are welcomed by a community of American expatriates but neither John nor Chloe really fit in there, despite the arrangement of a marriage to allow John to remain. Making a difficult decision to return, John and Chloe head for the border and an uncertain fate. When Chloe is arrested and has to go to prison, John waits for her, and upon returning to the United States, has made a determination that he can make a difference. As the film ends, "John Logue for State Senate" can be seen on a bumper sticker on his car.

== Cast ==
- Breckin Meyer as John Logue
- Anna Paquin as Chloe Hamon
- Joyce Krenz as John's mother
- Richard Blackburn as John's father
- Adriana O'Neil as Gloria O'Neill
- Seun Olagunju as Randall
- Bryan Clark as The Horny American
- Nick Ouellette as Hal
- Tim Henry as Charlie
- James Juce as Larry
- Elicia Cronin as Sandy
- Judy Cook as Bride
- Grace Lynn Kung as Esther Yang
- Darcy Fehr as U.S. Border Guard
- Francis Fontaine as Canadian Customs Officer
- Bobby Stahr as Draft Dodger

== Production ==
Anna Paquin, who plays the female lead, also served as executive producer of this film.

Blue State was shot on location in Winnipeg (Paquin's hometown) and the border crossing at Emerson, in Manitoba in the spring of 2006. Principal photography wrapped in late April 2006 after a 20-day shoot. The film was the first and only work from Paquin Films, a production company formed by Paquin and her brother, Andrew.

== Reception ==
=== Release ===
Blue State premiered at the 2007 Tribeca Film Festival and, subsequently, was shown at the CineVegas Film Festival in the Diamond Discoveries section in June 2007. The film had its European Premiere in the international competition of the Zurich Film Festival in 2007.

=== Critical response ===
On the review aggregator website Rotten Tomatoes, 40% of 5 critics' reviews are positive.

In his review for Variety, Robert Koehler said that "played winningly by Breckin Meyer and Anna Paquin — the pic plays as a breezy, human road movie, only to stumble on cliches and strained satire once it crosses the border."

On its release in DVD format, David Cornelius from DVD Talk commented, "There are a lot of ham-fisted ideals flying about here, and it's all a bit too crudely processed for the movie's own good. But then Lewy lets the politics step out of the way and the characters to step back in, and we leave smiling."

== Home media ==
Blue State was released on DVD on February 12, 2008 in Region 1 by Metro-Goldwyn-Mayer in a dual sided format with side A being a 1.33:1 pan and scan version and side B having the film in 1.78:1 widescreen. The DVD includes subtitles and an audio commentary by writer and director Marshall Lewy. Sony Pictures Home Entertainment released Blue State in Canada on February 28, 2008 on a single-sided disc containing the film in 1.78:1 widescreen. It has the audio commentary but does not have subtitles.
