= I Cried When You Died =

- Official artwork

EP by Emily Kinney
- Released: September 18, 2026
- Genres: Blues, experimental rock, pop
- Label: Em-K Music

Emily Kinney chronology
Swimteam (2023)	I Cried When You Died (2026)

Singles from I Cried When You Died
- 1. "Hold On" Released: August 21, 2026

I Cried When You Died is an extended play by American singer and songwriter, Emily Kinney. The EP is inspired by Kinney's experience playing the character Beth Greene on AMC's The Walking Dead. It is preceded by one single, "Hold On", a cover of Tom Waits' original song that Kinney originally performed in the 2013 episode "I Ain't a Judas". The EP was released digitally on 18 September 2026.

According to Kinney, the EP had been in development for ten years prior to its official release, and was named after a common response she received from fans regarding her character's death. The work consists of covers from the show, alongside some original songs.

== Development and release ==
Shortly after announcing she would return to The Walking Dead universe in Dead City, Kinney revealed that a new album would release in September, with its contents being based on the show and her former character. To promote the EP, Kinney released the single "Hold On", a cover of Tom Waits' song she performed on the show, on 21 August 2026.

The EP consists of one original song written and performed by Kinney, titled "Steven's Weed", which is about “a time [she] smoked a little bit too much of Steven [Yeun]’s weed." The song "The Parting Glass" is a cover from season 3 of The Walking Dead, where it was originally rewritten performed alongside Lauren Cohan. The song was rewritten once more for I Cried When You Died.

The EP will be released in CD format on 20 November 2026.

== Track listing ==
I Cried When You Died track listing
No.	Title	Writer(s)	Producer(s)	Length
1.	"Hold On"	Tom Waits; Kathleen Brennan	Ben Greenspan	4:36
2.	"Struggling Man"	Jimmy Cliff	Ben Greenspan	3:12
3.	"I Do not Want To Grow Up"	Tom Waits; Kathleen Brennan	Ben Greenspan; Emily Kinney	2:56
4.	"Steven's Weed"	Emily Kinney	Ben Greenspan; Emily Kinney	3:30
5.	"The Parting Glass"	Emily Kinney; Greg Wells	Ben Greenspan; Emily Kinney	3:03
Total length:				17:19
