= The Enormity of Life =

- Poster
- Directed by: Eric Swinderman
- Written by: Eric Swinderman; Carmen DeFranco
- Starring: Breckin Meyer; Emily Kinney; Giselle Eisenberg
- Release date: April 6, 2021
- Running time: 102 minutes
- Country: United States
- Language: English

The Enormity of Life (formerly titled Anhedonia) is a 2021 American comedy film written by Eric Swinderman and Carmen DeFranco, directed by Swinderman and starring Breckin Meyer, Emily Kinney and Giselle Eisenberg. It is Swinderman’s feature directorial debut.

== Cast ==
- Breckin Meyer as Casey
- Emily Kinney as Jess
- Giselle Eisenberg as Jules

== Production ==
The film was shot in Cleveland, Middleburg Heights, Ohio, Lakewood, Ohio, Elyria, Ohio, Beachwood, Ohio, Lorain, Ohio, Medina, Ohio, Rocky River, Ohio, North Royalton, Ohio and New Philadelphia, Ohio. A scene was also shot in Tuscora Park. Filming wrapped in May 2018.

== Release ==
The film was released on Apple TV on April 6, 2021. The film was also released at the Paris Arts and Movie Awards (PAMA) Film Festival in September 2021. Then it was released on Blu-ray and digital platforms on August 9, 2022.

== Reception ==
Lorry Kikta of Film Threat scored the film a 6.5 out of 10.

Clement Goh of CGMagazine also scored the film a 6.5.
