= Jordan Allen-Dutton =

American writer, producer, and director (born 1977)

Jordan Allen-Dutton (born April 16, 1977) is an American writer, producer, and director. He is best known for co-creating the play The Bomb-itty of Errors and for his writing on the stop-motion television series Robot Chicken.

== Biography ==
Allen-Dutton was born on April 16, 1977, in Palo Alto, California. He graduated with a B.F.A. from New York University’s Tisch School of the Arts, where he studied at the Experimental Theatre Wing. In 2000, he received the inaugural Tisch School of the Arts Award for The Bomb-itty of Errors.

=== Early career ===
In 1999, Allen-Dutton co-created and starred in The Bomb-itty of Errors, a so-called “Add-Rap-Tation” of Shakespeare’s Comedy of Errors that mixed hip-hop and Shakespeare. The show debuted Off-Broadway at 45 Bleecker Street and went on to run in London’s West End, Chicago, Los Angeles, Amsterdam, Edinburgh, Dublin, Florida, Philadelphia, and St. Louis, and continues to play internationally. The Bomb-itty of Errors is published by Samuel French.

In 2002, he co-created and starred in the MTV sketch comedy series Scratch & Burn and attended the Sundance Institute’s Screenwriting Lab with a film adaptation of The Bomb-itty of Errors.

=== Technology and Entrepreneurship ===
In 2004, Allen-Dutton founded the software company Talking Panda, which created applications for mobile devices. Its talking phrasebook app iLingo was among the first products in the Apple App Store and was featured in Time magazine in November 2008. Talking Panda iLingo was also included in the iPhone App Store on launch day.

=== Famous Last Nerds and NERDS ===
Also in 2004, Allen-Dutton formed the company Famous Last Nerds with collaborator Erik Weiner to create their musical comedy NERDS, dramatizing the rise of Bill Gates and Steve Jobs from garage inventors to industry titans. Although its planned Broadway opening was halted, the production persisted through subsequent development and regional stagings. It gained renewed acclaim during a limited run at the Curve Theatre in Leicester in July 2025, where critics praised its wit and energy. It then moved to the Edinburgh Festival Fringe in August 2025, where reviewers described it as “a rollicking rap battle” between Jobs and Gates, marking its full-fledged comeback.

Allen-Dutton and Weiner’s video Shawshank In A Minute, directed by John Landis, won JibJab’s Great Sketch Experiment in 2006. The pair also co-wrote comedic songs including “I'm So Straight,” “One Line on the Sopranos,” and “I Google Myself,” produced by Yung Mars.

=== Television and Film Work ===
Allen-Dutton has written for and produced television shows including America's Best Dance Crew, Snoop Dogg’s Father Hood (where he co-wrote the pilot episode “Downward Dogg” with Erik Weiner and David Roma), NBC’s The Sing-Off, the MTV Movie Awards, HBO’s Brave New Voices (as head writer), and Lip Sync Battle.

On Robot Chicken, Allen-Dutton is credited as writer for numerous episodes spanning 2005–2012, including:

- “Celebrity Rocket” (S2E4, April 23, 2006)
- “Dragon Nuts” (S2E5, April 30, 2006)
- “Cracked China” (S2E7, May 14, 2006)
- “Rodiggity” (S2E8, May 21, 2006)
- “Massage Chair” (S2E9, May 28, 2006)
- “Password: Swordfish” (S2E10, June 4, 2006)
- “The Godfather of the Bride II” (S5E16, December 4, 2011)
- “Fool’s Goldfinger” (S5E18, December 18, 2011)
- “Fight Club Paradise” (S5E20, January 15, 2012)

He also co-wrote the special Robot Chicken: Star Wars (2007). His work on the series earned three Primetime Emmy Award nominations for Outstanding Animated Program (2008, 2009, 2011).

=== Recent and Upcoming Work ===
In 2024, Allen-Dutton was announced as the screenwriter for a forthcoming biopic on fitness icon Richard Simmons, to be produced by Warner Bros. Pictures.

== Awards and nominations ==
- Winner, Tisch School of the Arts Award (2000) – Inaugural award for The Bomb-itty of Errors.
- Winner, Drama Desk Award (1999) – Outstanding Lyrics, The Bomb-itty of Errors.
- Winner, Lucille Lortel Award (2011) – Outstanding Musical, We the People: America Rocks!.
- Nominated, Primetime Emmy Award (2008, 2009, 2011) – Outstanding Animated Program, Robot Chicken.

== Selected filmography ==
Year	Title	Role	Notes
1999	The Bomb-itty of Errors	Co-creator / Performer	Off-Broadway and international productions
2002	Scratch & Burn	Co-creator / Actor	MTV series
2004	Talking Panda	Founder	Developer of iLingo app
2004–2025	NERDS	Co-writer / Producer	Musical comedy; multiple productions
2005–2012	Robot Chicken	Writer	Multiple episodes; Emmy-nominated
2007	Robot Chicken: Star Wars	Writer	TV special
2007	Snoop Dogg’s Father Hood	Writer	Pilot episode “Downward Dogg”
2010	Brave New Voices	Head Writer	HBO series
2024	Richard Simmons Biopic	Screenwriter	Warner Bros. Pictures
