= Breckin Meyer =

American actor (born 1974)

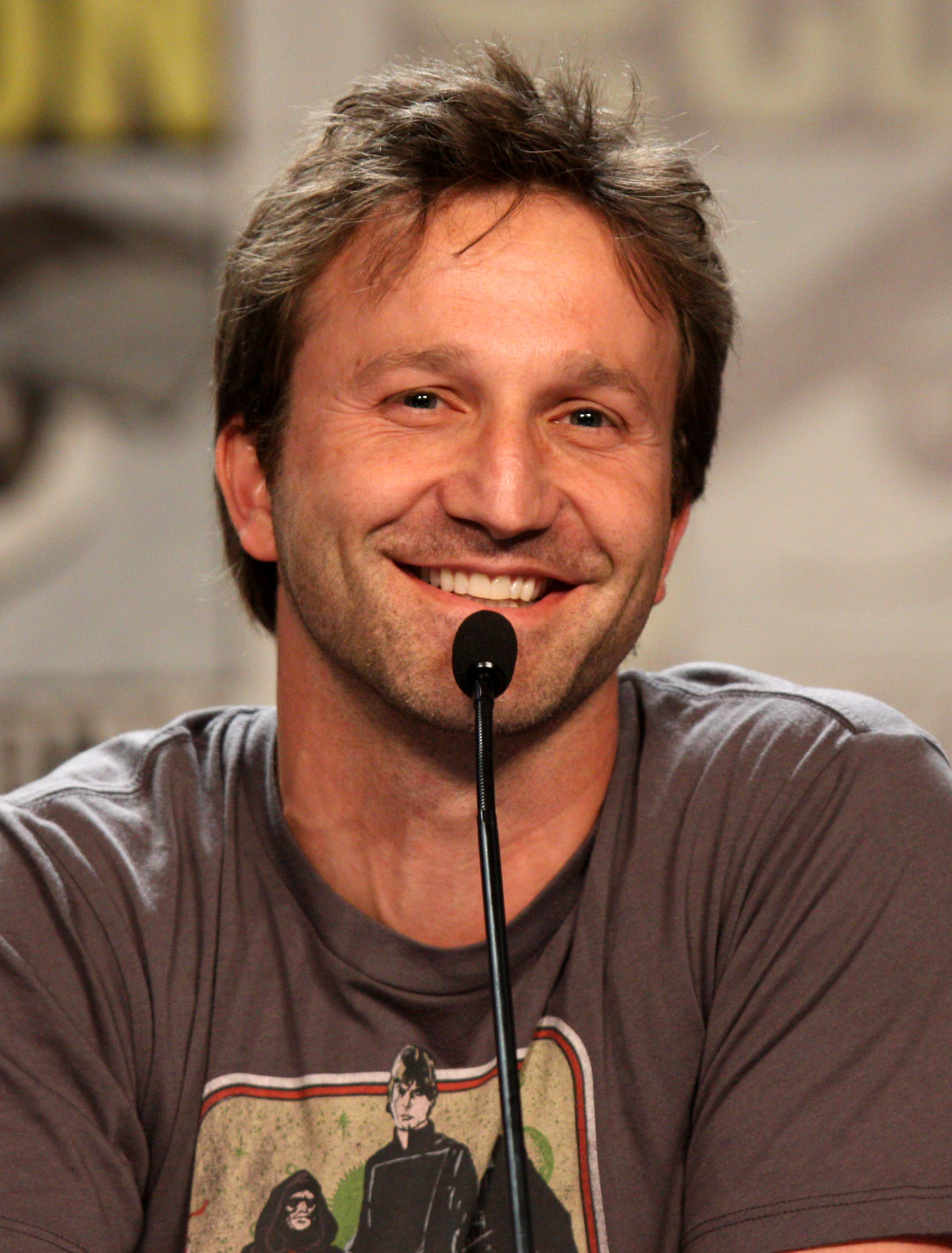
- Meyer at the 2011 San Diego Comic-Con
- Born: May 7, 1974 (age 52); Minneapolis, Minnesota, U.S.
- Occupations: Actor; screenwriter
- Years active: 1983–present
- Spouse: Deborah Kaplan (m. 2001; div. 2014)
- Children: 2

Breckin Meyer (born May 7, 1974) is an American actor, writer and podcaster. He is best known for his work on the Adult Swim animated sketch series Robot Chicken, which has earned him two Annie Awards and five Primetime Emmy Award nominations.

Meyer gained traction with main roles on the ABC sitcom The Jackie Thomas Show (1992–1993) and the NBC sitcom The Home Court (1995–1996), alongside supporting roles in the films Freddy's Dead: The Final Nightmare (1991), Clueless (1995), and The Craft (1996). He had his breakout with the lead role in the sex comedy film Road Trip (2000). Meyer followed this with starring roles in the films Rat Race (2001), Kate & Leopold (2001), and Pinocchio (2002). He received further recognition for his role as Jon Arbuckle in Garfield: The Movie (2004) and Garfield: A Tail of Two Kitties (2006). Meyer has also had starring roles in the films Herbie: Fully Loaded (2005), Ghosts of Girlfriends Past (2009), Changeland (2019), and Unpregnant (2020).

Meyer had lead roles as Tom Wagner on the ABC sitcom Married to the Kellys (2003–2004) and Jared Franklin on the TNT legal comedy-drama series Franklin & Bash (2011–2014), as well as a main role on the ABC series The Fix (2019). He created the TBS sitcom Men at Work (2012–2014). Meyer had a main voice role as pubescent Joseph Gribble on the Fox animated sitcom King of the Hill (2000–2010).

== Early life ==
Breckin Meyer was born on May 7, 1974, in Minneapolis, Minnesota, to Dorothy Ann (née Vial), a travel agent and former microbiologist, and Christopher William Meyer, a management consultant. He has lived in California, Texas, West Virginia, and New Jersey. He has an older brother, Frank, and a younger brother, Adam. Meyer attended elementary school with Drew Barrymore (and was apparently her first kiss) and also attended Beverly Hills High School. Through his elementary school, he came into contact with Barrymore's agent, who signed Meyer. As a little boy, he was mostly seen in television advertisements, and also appeared as a child participant in the game show Child's Play. He also claims to have slept in a closed coffin for several years in high school.

== Career ==
In his early career, Meyer had roles in the ABC sitcom The Jackie Thomas Show (1992–1993) and the NBC sitcom The Home Court (1995–1996). In his early films, Meyer played several roles as a druggie, starting with his debut in Freddy's Dead: The Final Nightmare (1991), in which he was dispatched in a video game. His breakthrough screen role was in the teen hit Clueless (1995) as the skateboarding stoner, Travis Birkenstock. Meyer gave similar characterizations in The Craft and John Carpenter's Escape from L.A. (both 1996). He played the best friend of an Olympic hopeful in the biopic Prefontaine (1997) and a high-school student yearning to leave his hometown in Dancer, Texas Pop. 81 (1998).

In 54 (also 1998), a look at life in the famous '70s nightspot Studio 54, the actor was cast as a busboy married to the coat check girl (Salma Hayek) and pursued by a bartender (Ryan Phillippe). Meyer is close friends with Phillippe, with whom he and Seth Green own a production company.

Meyer would subsequently appear in films including Go (1999) and The Insider (1999) before graduating to a full-fledged leading role in the DreamWorks hit Road Trip (2000), in which he again played a character traveling cross country, a college student hoping desperately to retrieve a videotape of himself having sex with another girl, which was accidentally mailed to his long-distance girlfriend.

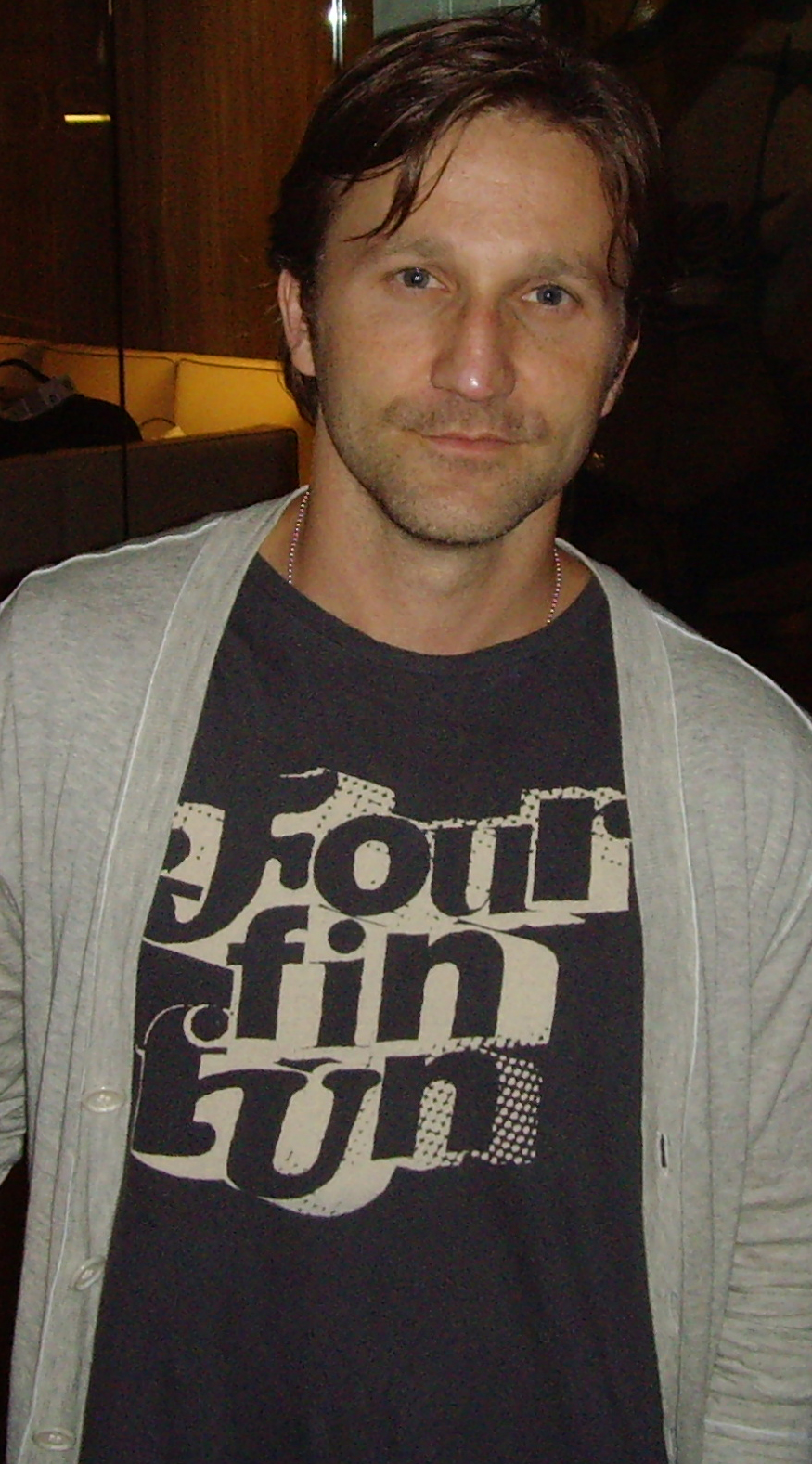
Meyer in February 2007

He re-teamed with Amy Smart in yet another racing cross country film, this time as part of the multi-plot ensemble of Rat Race (2001), a sort-of homage to the all-star screwball chase films of the 1960s, such as It's a Mad, Mad, Mad, Mad World. Meyer put in a supporting turn as Meg Ryan's character's brother in the whimsical fantasy-comedy Kate & Leopold (2001). He provided the voice of Pinocchio in the English version of Pinocchio (2002). Meyer also took on the role of Jon Arbuckle, the hapless owner of the famed comic strip cat in the film adaptation of Garfield (2004) and its sequel, Garfield: A Tail of Two Kitties (2006). He also had a supporting role as Lindsay Lohan's character's brother in Disney's Herbie: Fully Loaded (2005).

Meyer also starred in Blue State (2007) with Anna Paquin in which he plays a passionately liberal guy on the campaign trail for John Kerry in the 2004 elections. He drunkenly pledges to move to Canada if Bush wins the election, and on his journey meets a mysterious young woman, played by Paquin. He co-starred with Matthew McConaughey in Ghosts of Girlfriends Past (2009). He later starred in the films Changeland (2019), and Unpregnant (2020). Meyer starred opposite Emily Kinney and Giselle Eisenberg in the independent dark comedy The Enormity of Life (2021) about a suicidal man struggling with life and love.

On television, Meyer played Tom Wagner in the ABC sitcom Married to the Kellys (2003–2004) and Jared Franklin in the TNT legal comedy-drama series Franklin & Bash (2011–2014), as well as Charlie West in the ABC series The Fix (2019). He created the TBS sitcom Men at Work (2012–2014). Meyer regularly does writing and voice work on Robot Chicken, and was nominated for an Emmy for his writing on the Robot Chicken: Star Wars specials. He also voiced the adolescent Joseph Gribble on the animated series King of the Hill and starred on the Adult Swim series Titan Maximum.

Meyer is also a musician, playing drums in the punk band The Street Walkin' Cheetahs as well as with artists including The Nightwatchman, Ben Harper, Cypress Hill, Slash and Perry Farrell at L.A.'s Hotel Café.

Meyer was the drummer for the Nightwatchman's (Tom Morello) backing band, called The Freedom Fighter Orchestra. Meyer toured with the Nightwatchman's 2008 Justice Tour. He appears in Street Sweeper Social Club's video for "100 Little Curses" and "Promenade".

== Personal life ==
Meyer married screenwriter and film director Deborah Kaplan on October 14, 2001, and has two daughters with her. They divorced in 2014.

As of 2024, he is dating Kelly Rizzo, the widow of Bob Saget.

His brother, Frank Meyer, was a staffer and producer of Fresh Ink Online at G4tv.com.

== Filmography ==
=== Film ===
Year	Title	Role	Notes
1990	Camp Cucamonga	Cody	
1991	Freddy's Dead: The Final Nightmare	Spencer Lewis	
1995	Clueless	Travis Birkenstock	
1995	Payback	Jim's Son	
1996	The Craft	Mitt	
1996	Escape from L.A.	Surfer	
1997	Prefontaine	Pat Tyson	
1997	Touch	Greg Czarnicki	
1998	Dancer, Texas Pop. 81	Keller Coleman	
1998	Can't Hardly Wait	Walter	Uncredited
1998	54	Greg Randazzo	
1999	Go	Tiny	
1999	The Insider	Sharon's Son	
1999	Tail Lights Fade	Cole	
2000	Road Trip	Josh Parker	
2001	Josie and the Pussycats	Marco	
2001	Rat Race	Nick Schaffer	
2001	Kate & Leopold	Charlie McKay	
2002	Pinocchio	Pinocchio	Voice, English dub
2004	Garfield: The Movie	Jon Arbuckle	
2004	Blast	Jamal	
2005	Herbie: Fully Loaded	Ray Peyton Jr.	
2005	Rebound	Tim Fink	
2006	Caffeine	Dylan	
2006	Garfield: A Tail of Two Kitties	Jon Arbuckle	
2006	Ted's MBA	Ted Meyers	Also known as Corporate Affairs
2007	Blue State	John Logue	
2008	Stag Night	Tony	
2009	Ghosts of Girlfriends Past	Paul Mead	
2010	The Maiden Heist	Starving Artist	
2013	3 Geezers!	Breckin	
2013	I Know That Voice	Himself	Documentary
2019	Changeland	Dan	
2020	California No	Famous Actor	
2020	Unpregnant	Mark	
2021	Happily	Richard	
2021	The Enormity of Life	Casey	
2026	Quarter	Jim	Post-production
2027	Romy and Michele 2	TBA	Filming

=== Television ===
Year	Title	Role	Notes
1983	Child's Play	Himself	Child contestant
1986	Potato Head Kids	Spud	Voice, 23 episodes
1988	The Wonder Years	Gary Cosey	Episode: "The Heart of Darkness"
1989	Chicken Soup	Glen	Episode: "The Dinner"
1990	L.A. Law	Brian Campbell	Episode: "Whatever Happened to Hannah?"
1992–1993	The Jackie Thomas Show	Chas Walker	18 episodes
1993	CBS Schoolbreak Special	Eddie	Episode: "Crosses on the Lawn"
1995	Betrayed: The Story of Three Women	Eric Nelson	TV movie
1995–1996	The Home Court	Mike Solomon	20 episodes
1996	Clueless	Harrison	Episode: "Do We with Bad Haircuts Not Feel?"
1996	Party of Five	Alec Brody	Episode: "Gimme Shelter"
2000–2010	King of the Hill	Joseph Gribble	Voice, recurring role
2001–2002	Inside Schwartz	Adam Schwartz	13 episodes
2002	Kim Possible	Josh Mankey	Voice, episode: "Crush"
2003	Coupling	Jeff Clancy	Episode: "Original Pilot"
2003–2004	Married to the Kellys	Tom Wagner	22 episodes
2005–present	Robot Chicken	Various voices	Also writer and producer
2007	Robot Chicken: Star Wars	Boba Fett, Admiral Ackbar	Voice, television special
2008	House	Brandon	Episode: "Adverse Events"
2008	Robot Chicken: Star Wars Episode II	Boba Fett, Admiral Ackbar	Voice, television special
2008	Heroes	Frack	2 episodes
2009	Party Down	Michael	Episode: "Taylor Stiltskin Sweet Sixteen"
2009	Titan Maximum	Commander Palmer	Voice, 9 episodes
2010	Robot Chicken: Star Wars Episode III	Boba Fett, Admiral Ackbar	Voice, television special
2011	Mad	Prince Zuko, Green Arrow, Sean Parker	Episode: "The Social Netjerk/Smallville: Turn Off the Clark"
2011–2014	Franklin & Bash	Jared Franklin	40 episodes
2012–2014	Men at Work	—N/a	Creator, writer and executive producer
2012	Robot Chicken DC Comics Special	Superman, Mirror Master	Voice, television special
2014	Robot Chicken DC Comics Special 2: Villains in Paradise	Superman, Bizarro	Voice, television special
2015	Robot Chicken DC Comics Special III: Magical Friendship	Superman, Plastic Man	Voice, television special
2015–2017	SuperMansion	Courtney / Ringler, Various Voices	11 episodes
2016	Second Chance	Wally Luskin	Episode: "That Time in the Car"
2016	Family Guy	S&M Guy	Voice, episode: "A Lot Going on Upstairs"
2018	Designated Survivor	Trey Kirkman	6 episodes
2019	The Fix	Charlie West	10 episodes
2020	American Dad!	Himself	Episode: "A Starboy Is Born"
2020	Crossing Swords	Glenn	Voice, 4 episodes
2021	Good Girls	Vance	6 episodes
2026	Law & Order: Special Victims Unit	Dr. Austin Severson	Episode: "Vivid"

=== Video games ===
Year	Title	Role
2016	Titanfall 2	Dr. Jefferson Boyle

=== Awards and nominations ===
Year	Award	Category	Nominated work	Result
1988	Young Artist Awards	Best Animation Voice Over Group (shared with the cast)	Potato Head Kids	Nominated
2000	Teen Choice Awards	Choice Movie Chemistry (shared with Amy Smart)	Road Trip	Nominated
2002	Stinkers Bad Movie Awards	Worst Actor (shared with Roberto Benigni)	Pinocchio	Nominated
2003	Golden Raspberry Awards	Worst Actor (shared with Roberto Benigni)	Pinocchio	Won
2008	Primetime Emmy Awards	Outstanding Animated Program	Robot Chicken: Star Wars	Nominated
2009	Primetime Emmy Awards	Outstanding Animated Program	Robot Chicken: Star Wars Episode II	Nominated
2009	Annie Awards	Best Writing in an Animated Television Production or Short Form	Robot Chicken: Star Wars Episode II	Won
2011	Annie Awards	Best Writing in a Television Production	Robot Chicken: Star Wars Episode III	Won
2011	Primetime Emmy Awards	Outstanding Animated Program	Robot Chicken: Star Wars Episode III	Nominated
2014	Primetime Emmy Awards	Outstanding Short Form Animated Program	Robot Chicken	Nominated
2020	Primetime Emmy Awards	Outstanding Short Form Animated Program	Robot Chicken	Nominated
