= Charles Horn (writer) =

Canadian comedy writer and vegan activist

- Born: Toronto, Ontario, Canada
- Education: Princeton University (PhD in Electrical Engineering)
- Occupations: screenwriter, activist

Charles Horn is a Canadian comedy writer, producer and vegan activist.

== Biography ==
Charles Horn was born and raised in Toronto, Ontario, Canada and received his PhD in Electrical Engineering from Princeton University. Horn has written for Fugget About It, Robot Chicken, Robot Chicken: Star Wars, HBO, and freelanced for The Tonight Show with Jay Leno. He is also the author of The Laugh Out Loud Guide: Ace the SAT Exam without Boring Yourself to Sleep!, a comedic and educational SAT study guide published by Andrews McMeel. Horn was nominated in 2008 for an Emmy award for his writing on Robot Chicken: Star Wars.

== Veganism ==
Horn has authored Meat Logic: Why Do We Eat Animals, a book examining justifications for eating meat and other animal products. The book argues for veganism.

== Bibliography ==
- The Laugh Out Loud Guide: Ace the SAT Exam without Boring Yourself to Sleep!, Andrews McMeel Publishing, 2008.
- That's Just Wrong! (a collection of sketch comedy), 2011.
- That's Just Wrong 2! (a collection of sketch comedy), 2012.
- That's Just Wrong 3! (a collection of sketch comedy), 2013.
- Meat Logic: Why Do We Eat Animals?, 2014.
