= Emily Kinney =

American actress, singer, and songwriter

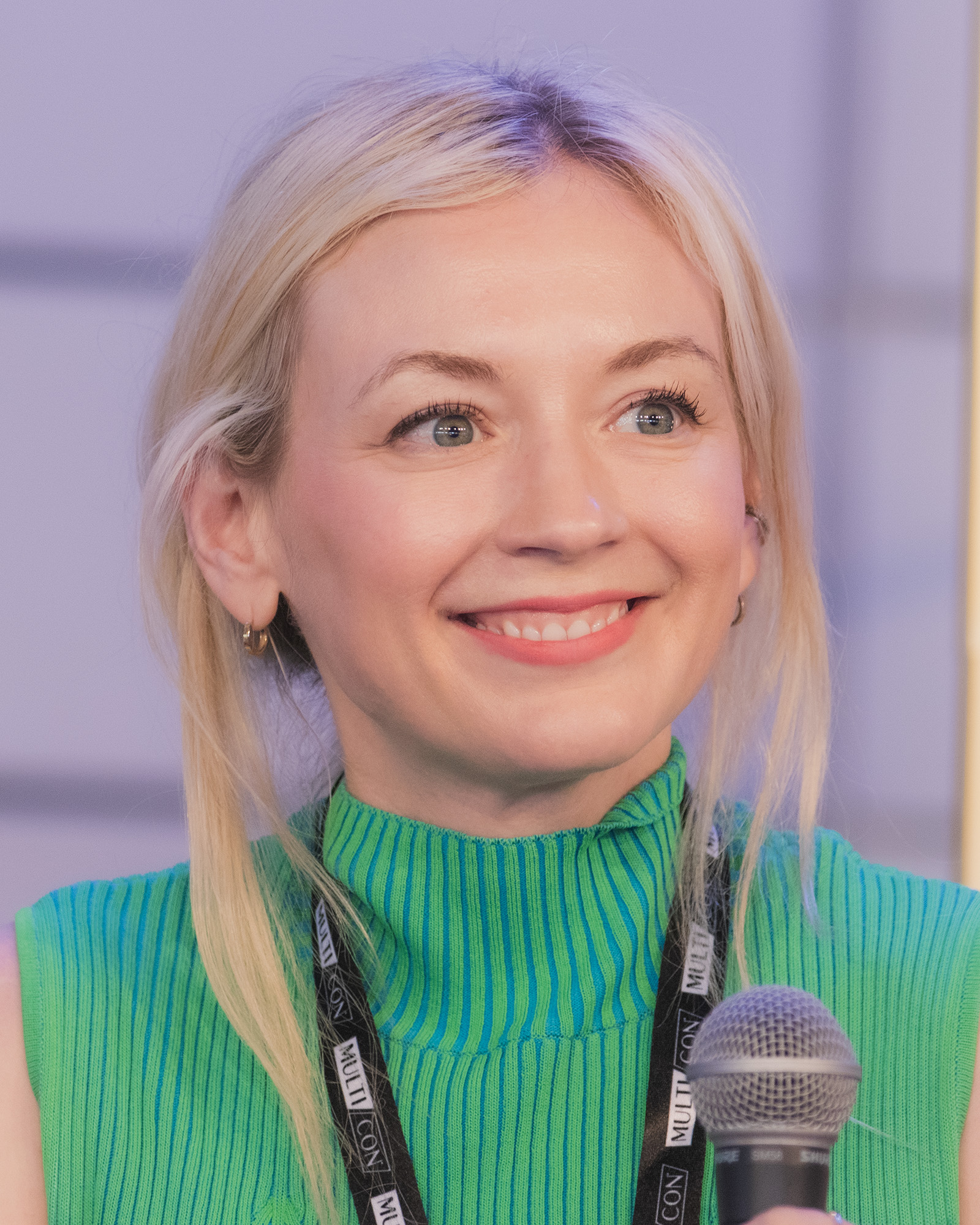
- Kinney in 2026
- Born: Emily Rebecca Kinney; August 15, 1985 (age 41); Wayne, Nebraska, U.S.
- Occupations: Actress; singer; songwriter; model
- Years active: 2006–present
- Television: The Walking Dead; Conviction
- Musical career
- Genre: Pop
- Instruments: Vocals; guitar; piano
- Years active: 2011–present
- Website: emilykinneymusic.com

Emily Rebecca Kinney (born August 15, 1985) is an American actress, singer, and songwriter. She is known for her role as Beth Greene on AMC's horror drama television series The Walking Dead (2011–2015, 2018), as well as it's spin off The Walking Dead: Dead City (2026). Kinney has also appeared on other television series, including Showtime's critically acclaimed Masters of Sex and The CW's The Flash and Arrow. In 2016, she co-starred in the ABC series Conviction, alongside Hayley Atwell.

== Early life ==
Kinney was born in Wayne, Nebraska, to Vaughn Charles and Jeanne Kinney. She has an older sister, Sara. She and her family frequently moved during her youth, including to Nevada, Oregon, and other parts of Nebraska. Kinney attended New York University for a semester. In 2006, she graduated from Nebraska Wesleyan University with a Bachelor of Arts degree in theatre. Kinney then moved to New York, where she pursued a Broadway and acting career.

== Career ==
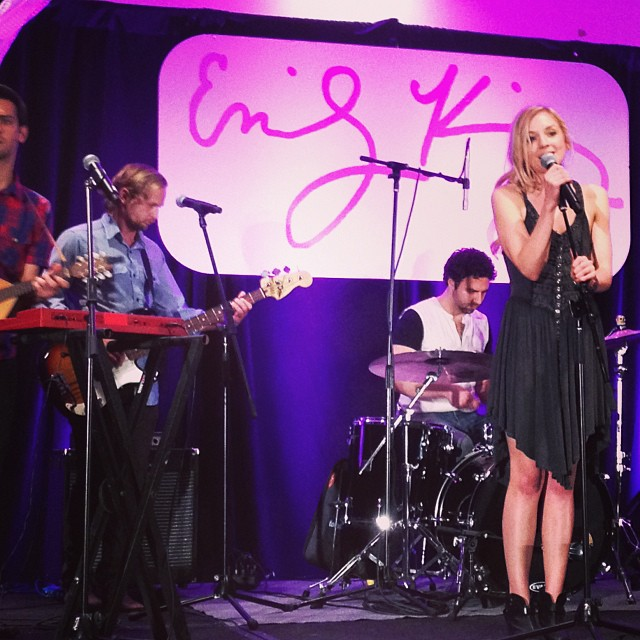
Kinney performing in 2013

Kinney worked in coffee shops, where she began to meet people from the acting and music industries. She appeared in 20 plays during her four years of college and began her professional acting career at age 21, when she was cast in the play Spring Awakening as Anna, a young German schoolgirl. The following year, Kinney costarred as Jean Fordham in the play August: Osage County. She was then cast as Emily on Showtime's The Big C. Later, Kinney appeared on NBC's Law & Order: Criminal Intent, where she guest starred as Jeannie Richmonds. Kinney made her film debut with Aunt Tigress playing Gina. Kinney continued acting in a variety of recurring guest and cameo roles in various films and television shows.

In 2011, Kinney was cast as the recurring character Beth Greene on The Walking Dead, an AMC television horror drama. Although she was actually 25 at the start of production, her character Beth was the 16-year-old sister of Maggie in Season 2. After two years on the program, Kinney received a promotion to series regular. Greene is one of a small group who must find a way to not only survive a zombie apocalypse, but who must also cope with other survivors who are even more dangerous than the undead. She contributed to The Walking Dead: Original Soundtrack – Vol. 1, in which she collaborated with Lauren Cohan on the single, "The Parting Glass". Kinney finished her role on The Walking Dead as Beth in 2014, but made one final appearance in 2015 in the ninth episode of the fifth season.

Kinney reprised her role of Beth Greene in November 2018 through voiceover, which is heard in Andrew Lincoln's final episode asking his character Rick Grimes what is his wound.

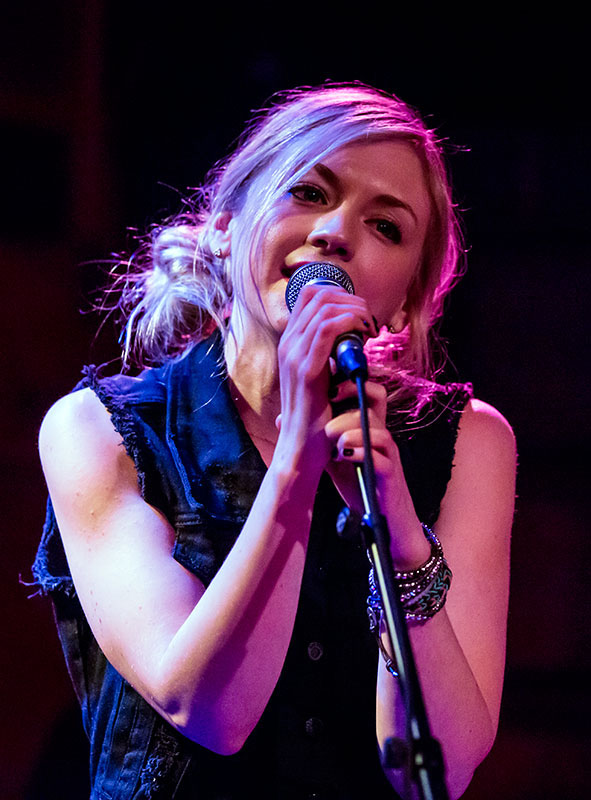
Kinney at Rockwood Music Hall in NYC in 2014

Kinney returned to the Law & Order franchise in Law & Order: Special Victims Unit, in the role of Haley Cole. She released her second EP Expired Love in 2013. It was re-released in 2014 with two additional tracks. In an interview with AMC, Kinney talks about the story of the album: "'Expired Love' is about my story. But I do think that with my acting career, my style seeps into my career a lot. My songs are similar to Tom Waits' in that they're little stories. Sometimes I write songs based on one word or feeling that keeps popping up for me. And I do feel like, because I've never played a character for so long, that it can't help but seep its way into things. It's like, maybe this is why a particular idea keeps coming up for me, because this is something that we keep dealing with on the show!"

Kinney's new single, “Rockstar”, was released December 9, 2014. After her departure from The Walking Dead, she made guest appearances on several television shows, including a starring role in the sixteenth episode of ABC's Forever titled "Memories of Murder" and a co-starring spot in the eighteenth episode of The CW's The Flash titled "All-Star Team-Up". She also landed recurring television roles on Cinemax's The Knick and Showtime's critically acclaimed Masters of Sex for four episodes. Kinney starred in the music video for the Train song "Bulletproof Picasso". Kinney released her new studio album, This Is War, on October 2, 2015. As well as “This Is War”, the album featured another single, “Birthday Cake”.

In 2016, Kinney played the main character in Hallmark Channel's Love On The Sidelines. On February 12, 2016, it was announced that Kinney would be joining the main cast of ABC's Conviction alongside Hayley Atwell. On Conviction, Kinney played Tess Larson, "the paralegal for the Unit team who[, although] extremely bright, [was] a bit naive and occasionally, an underlying dark sadness emerge[d]." On March 30, 2016, Kinney made a guest appearance as Brie Larvan/Bug-Eyed Bandit on Arrow, a role she previously played on The Flash. On October 28, 2016, her new single, "Back on Love", was released.

On January 26, 2017, it was announced that Kinney would join the cast of ABC's Ten Days in the Valley alongside Kyra Sedgwick. Kinney, it was reported, would play Casey, "Jane's hip and upbeat young assistant who looks up to her boss as a role model". In October 2017, Kinney's single, Mermaid Song, was released. On August 24, 2018, Kinney released her solo album, Oh Jonathan, which included a single released earlier that month, “Boy Band Hero”. Kinney announced a tour in support of the album, marking her second tour.

== Filmography ==
=== Film ===
Year	Title	Role	Notes
2007	Aunt Tigress	Gina	Short film
2009	It's Complicated	Waitress	
2013	Concussion	The Girl	
2016	Papa	Caroline	
2021	The Enormity of Life	Jess	
TBA	Bad Eggs	TBA	

=== Television ===
Year	Title	Role	Notes
2007	Hot for Teacher	Tamara Bailey	Short
2007	The Gamekillers	The Swarm	Special
2008	Law & Order: Criminal Intent	Jeannie Richmonds	Episode: "Contract"
2009	The Unusuals	Amanda Maint	Episode: "The Apology Line"
2010	The Good Wife	Milla Burchfield	Episode: "Bad Girls"
2011	The Big C	Emily	3 episodes
2011–2015; 2018	The Walking Dead	Beth Greene	37 episodes Recurring (seasons 2–3); Also Starring (season 4); Main cast (season 5); Uncredited voice role (Episode: "What Comes After")
2012	Law & Order: Special Victims Unit	Haley Cole	Episode: "Hunting Ground"
2014	The Following	Mallory Hodge	Episode: "Teacher's Pet"
2015	Forever	Jennifer Schroeder	Episode: "Memories of Murder"
2015	Masters of Sex	Nora Everett	4 episodes
2015	The Knick	Nurse Daisy Ryan	3 episodes
2015; 2019	The Flash	Brie Larvan / Bug-Eyed Bandit	2 episodes
2016	Arrow	Brie Larvan / Bug-Eyed Bandit	Episode: "Beacon of Hope"
2016	Love on the Sidelines	Laurel Welk	Television film (Hallmark)
2016–2017	Conviction	Tess Larson	13 episodes
2017	Ten Days in the Valley	Casey	5 episodes
2020	Messiah	Staci Hardwick	5 episodes
2022	Santa Bootcamp	Emily Strauss	
2023	Alert: Missing Persons Unit.	Shannon Steerman/Georgia LaCava	Episode: "Shannon"
2026	The Walking Dead: Dead City	Beth Greene	Episode: "Genesis"

=== Video games ===
Year	Title	Role	Notes
2023	The Walking Dead: Destinies	Beth Greene	
2026	Grand Theft Auto VI	The Local Population	

== Stage ==
Year	Title	Role	Notes
2006	Spring Awakening	Anna	Replacement for Anna; understudy for Wendla
2009	August: Osage County	Jean Fordham	National Tour of 2009

== Discography ==
- Blue Toothbrush - EP (2011)
- Expired Love - EP (2013, 2014) (Note: Kinney re-released the studio album with additional tracks.)
- This Is War (2015)
- Oh Jonathan (2018)
- The Supporting Character (2021)
- Swimteam (2023)
- I Cried When You Died - EP (2026)
- TBA (2027)

== Tours ==
- This Is War Tour (2015)
- Oh Jonathan Tour (2018)

== Accolades ==
Year	Association	Category	Nominated work	Result
2015	Saturn Awards	Best Supporting Actress	The Walking Dead	Nominated
