= Doug Goldstein =

American television director, producer and writer

Douglas Goldstein
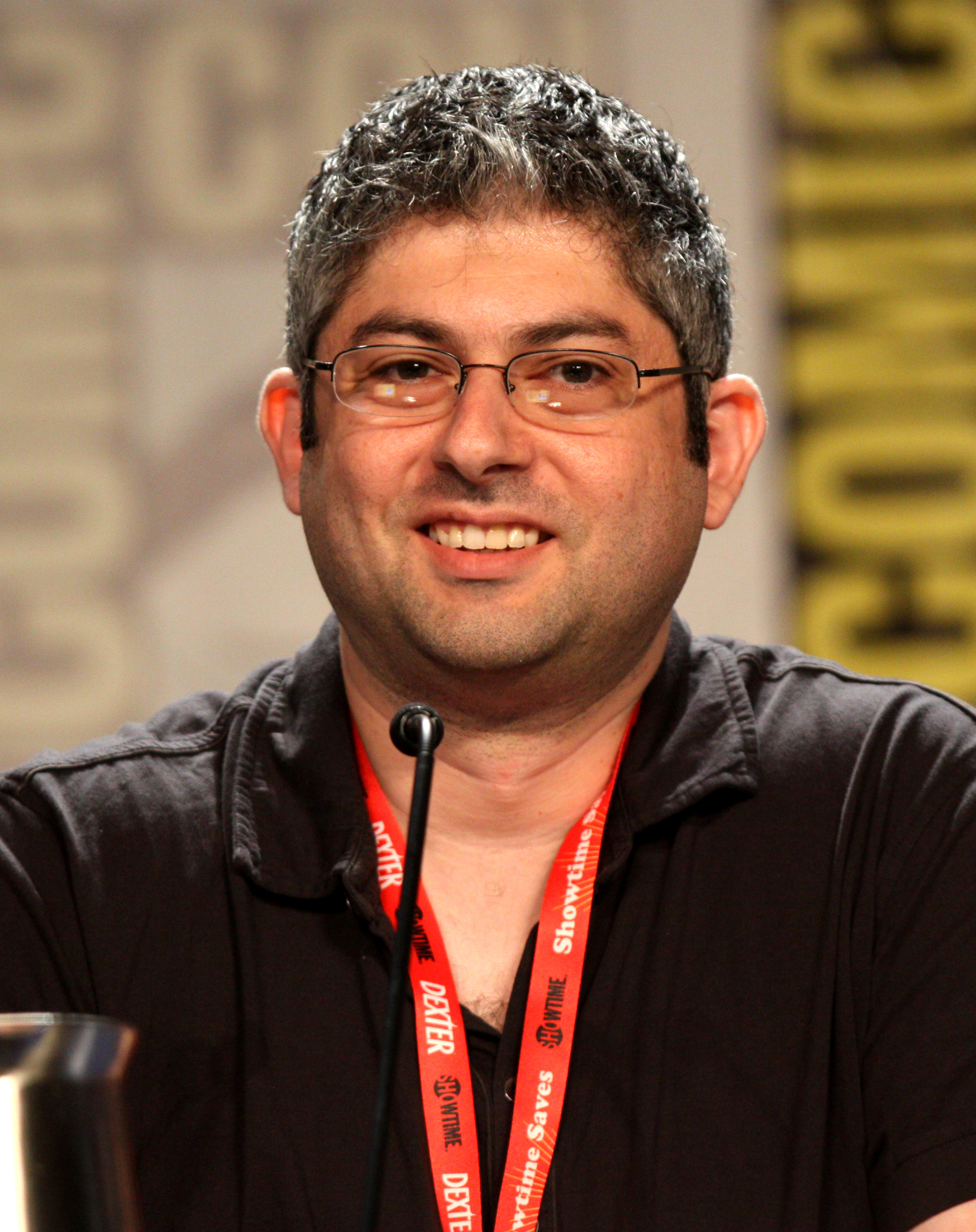
- Douglas Goldstein at the 2011 San Diego Comic-Con.
- Born: September 12, 1971 (age 54)
- Occupations: Writer, producer, television director
- Years active: 1997–present

Douglas Goldstein (born September 12, 1971) is an American screenwriter and television producer and director, primarily known for his work as co-head writer on the late-night animated series Robot Chicken. He won three Emmy Awards for episodes of Robot Chicken and has won three Annie Awards including one for Robot Chicken: Star Wars Episode II.

== Life and career ==
Born to a Jewish family, Goldstein was a founding member of Wizard Entertainment. During his 13 years at Wizard he was an editor, senior editor, and vice president of special projects, overseeing publications including Anime Insider, Toy Wishes, ToyFare, Toons, Sci-Fi Invasion, and numerous custom publishing works.

Goldstein was an editor and writer of ToyFare's humor strip Twisted ToyFare Theater for much of its run from 1997 to 2011. It has been compiled into several collected volumes.

He is one of the founding members of Robot Chicken, which hired a number of other writers from Twisted ToyFare Theater. Goldstein was also a writer and associate producer on Robot Chicken's predecessor show, Sweet J Presents, a series of twelve animated shorts which ran from 2001 to 2002 on Sony Entertainment's Screenblast.com.

Goldstein has written the half-hour animated pilot The Neighborhood for 20th Century Fox. He was a writer on Lucasfilm's Star Wars Detours animated series. He is the creator, writer and executive producer of the animated comedy "Devil May Care" starring Alan Tudyk and airing on SyFy's TZGZ programming block.
