= Mike Fasolo =

American writer

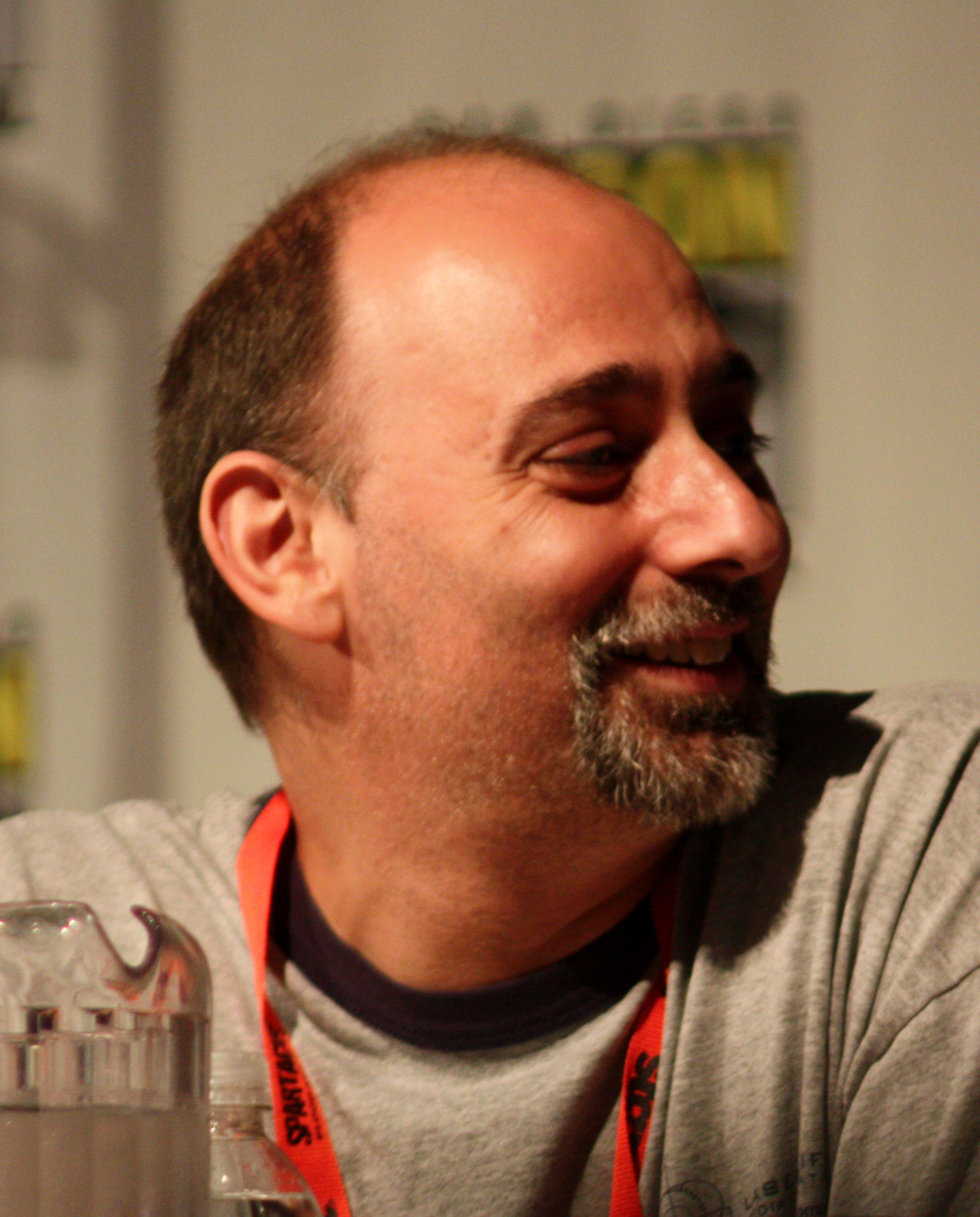
- Mike Fasolo at the 2009 San Diego Comic-Con
- Born: January 28, 1969 (age 56); Tuxedo, New York, U.S.
- Occupation: "Writer"
- Known for: Robot Chicken

Michael 'Mike' Fasolo (born January 28, 1969) is an American writer best known for his work on the television show Robot Chicken.

Fasolo was born and raised in the small town of Tuxedo, New York. He graduated from Tuxedo High School and earned his BA in Literature from Ramapo College of New Jersey. Fasolo's first writing job was at a local paper, the Photo News, where his first story was published on the front page.

In 1994, Fasolo joined the staff of Wizard Magazine as the head of the Research Department where he was in charge of gathering information and illustrations for the magazine. After a few months at Wizard, Fasolo accepted a job in the Editorial Department of Wizard's sister magazine, InQuest, where he reported on games and collectibles. After six months, he moved back to Wizard as a copy editor and staff writer.

At Wizard, Fasolo became friends with Matthew Senreich, the co-creator of Robot Chicken. In 2004, Cartoon Network picked up Robot Chicken and, at Senreich's request, Fasolo moved to California to be a writer on the show. He also serves as a voice actor and creative director for the show.

Fasolo is represented by the Gersh Agency.

== Awards ==
- 2009: Annie Award, winner of Writing in a Television Production for "Robot Chicken: Star Wars Episode II"
- 2010: Emmy Award, winner of Outstanding Short-format Animated Program for Robot Chicken
- 2011: Annie Award, winner of Writing in a Television Production for "Robot Chicken: Star Wars Episode III"
- 2016: Emmy Award, winner of Outstanding Short-format Animated Program for Robot Chicken
