= Hot Cross Buns =

A hot cross bun is a spiced sweet bun.

Hot Cross Buns may also refer to:

- Hot Cross Buns (film), a Channel 101 and YouTube internet video
- "Hot Cross Buns" (song), a nursery rhyme

== See also ==
- Hot Cross Bunny, a 1948 Warner Bros. Merrie Melodies theatrical animated short
