= Santa Inc. =

Adult animated television series

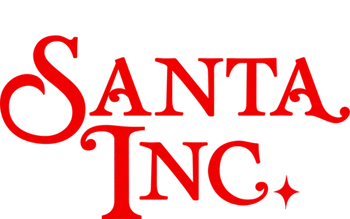
- Title logo
- Genre: Adult animation Black comedy Fantasy; Satire
- Created by: Alexandra Rushfield
- Showrunner: Alexandra Rushfield
- Written by: Alexandra Rushfield; Lisa Goldberg; Rachna Fruchbom; Guy Endore-Kaiser; Rochée Jeffrey; Ryan Shiraki; Dave King; Paul Rust; Andrew Gurland
- Directed by: Harry Chaskin
- Voices of: Sarah Silverman; Seth Rogen; Maria Bamford; Nicholas Braun; Joel Kim Booster; Leslie Grossman; Craig Robinson; Gabourey Sidibe
- Music by: Anna Waronker; Steven McDonald
- Countries of origin: Canada; United States
- Original language: English
- No. of episodes: 8

Production
- Executive producers: Alexandra Rushfield; Sarah Silverman; Seth Rogen; Evan Goldberg; James Weaver; Joshua Fagen; Seth Green; Matthew Senreich; John Harvatine IV; Eric Towner; Christopher Waters; Amy Zvi; Rosa Tran
- Cinematography: Andy Knapp
- Editor: Hank Friedmann
- Running time: 30 minutes
- Production companies: Rushfield Productions oh us. Point Grey Pictures; Stoopid Buddy Stoodios; Lionsgate Television

Original release
- Network: HBO Max
- Release: December 2, 2021

Santa Inc. is a 2021 adult stop-motion animated Christmas satirical black comedy fantasy television miniseries created by Alexandra Rushfield for HBO Max. It is a satirical parody of Christmas television films and specials produced by Rankin/Bass. It premiered on HBO Max on December 2, 2021 with eight episodes, to universally negative reception from both critics and viewers.

== Premise ==
Santa Inc. tells the story of Candy Smalls, the 20-year-old highest-ranking female Christmas elf in the North Pole who harbors the ambition of becoming the first ever female Santa Claus in the history of Christmas. When Santa's original successor Brent is poached by Amazon on Christmas Eve, Candy seizes her chance to break through the company's glass ceiling and realize her ultimate dream.

== Cast ==
=== Main ===
- Sarah Silverman as Candy Smalls, the 20-year-old highest-ranking female Christmas elf and Santa Claus's second-in-command who wants to become the first ever female Santa in the history of Christmas. She has a sibling rivalry with her older brother Tony.
- Seth Rogen as Santa Claus (also known as Saint Nick and his real name Llewellyn Fartini), a jolly middle-aged fat man who doesn't trust Candy Smalls for becoming a successor.
- Maria Bamford as Big Candy, a female elf and Candy and Tony Smalls's sexual widowed mother and Grandpa Smalls's daughter. She sometimes likes to go nude, even in public.
  - Bamford also voices Mrs. Claus, Santa Claus's wife.
- Nicholas Braun as Devin, an intern and Candy Smalls's co-worker at Santa Inc.
- Joel Kim Booster as Jingle Jim, an openly sexual elf who works with Santa Claus.
- Leslie Grossman as Cookie, a gingerbread woman and one of Candy Smalls's two best friends. She is described as being frazzled and loudmouthed.
- Craig Robinson as Junior, the leader of the all-male reindeer A-team and the son of Rudolph the Red-Nosed Reindeer who was in charge of pulling Santa Claus's sled. He was considered a ruder version of typical deer found in Christmas specials. He likes to dismiss fellow reindeer, use his status and fame for no good and yell at other reindeer who get in his way.
- Gabourey Sidibe as Goldie, a reindeer and a member of the all-female reindeer B-team and one of Candy Smalls's two best friends. She is openly bisexual and open on sexual topics and later begins dating Devin.

=== Guest ===
- Paul Rust as:
  - Jeremy, a talking snowflake and Candy Smalls's assistant.
  - Grandpa Smalls, an elderly male elf and Big Candy's father and Candy and Tony Smalls's overly sexual grandfather who encouraged Candy to become the next Santa Claus before being swept by the wind. Before being gone, he told Candy to delete the porn he had on his computer under the file name "Tax Stuff".
  - Cardinal Jeff Stryker
  - Odd Penguin
  - Rabbit
  - Rando Frat Bros #1
- Carmen Christopher as:
  - Tony Smalls, a 35-year-old rock musician elf and Candy Smalls's older brother.
  - Mayor Wallace Foster
  - Anti-Holiday Pigeon
  - Club Owner Penguin
  - Donner
  - Drunk Elf
  - Dying Man
  - Frat Guys
  - Man's Voice
  - Meteor
  - Paparazzi #1
  - Penguin Driver
  - Snowglobe Hunter
- Harry Chaskin as:
  - Dave-Pierre, a bartender elf severing at the bar where Candy Smalls often goes to.
  - Caroler
  - Congregation #1
  - Secret Service
  - Worker
- Dave Ferguson as:
  - Timmy the Toy Guy, a middle-aged toy maker with a slow speaking voice.
  - CEO Frederick Arthur
  - Black Gelatinous Creature
  - Captain
  - Congregation #2
  - Prancer III (or Prancer the Third), one of the members of the all-male reindeer A-team.
  - Rando Frat Bros #2
  - Sparky Fontaine
  - Walrus Caddy
- Ryan Shiraki as:
  - Snow Angel
  - Horse Cock
  - A-Team Men #1
  - Cuthberg NG, a Plymouth Rock representative and a news reporter for HNN.
  - Cuthbert
  - Paparazzi #2
- Evan Goldberg as:
  - Craig, Cookie's husband who does not act as a good father, leaving Cookie to do most of the work.
  - A-Team Men #2
  - Crowd
- Tim Meadows as Brent, the original successor of Santa Claus. He made Candy Smalls love his job while he served as a mentor, and for him as well, and were good friends. Brent left working for Santa Claus when Jeff Bezos told him he can work for him with Amazon on Christmas Eve.
- John Cameron Mitchell as Dr. Almonds, a doctor who works at Treehab Rehabilitation Center.
- John Slattery as Larson (also known as the King of Chocolate), the owner of a candy factory that Cookie works at. He sometimes hangs out with Santa Claus, Jingle Jim and Timmy the Toy Guy.
- Abbey McBride as:
  - Loud Carol
  - Masseuse
  - North Pole Police Woman
  - Partridge
  - Tra La La
- Beck Bennett as P3, Peter Rabbit's shy son who has a habit of stalking and learning all about Candy Smalls, which Candy doesn't mind.
- Megan Amram as:
  - ER Nurse
  - The Gummy Mermaids, a set of identical twin mermaids made out of gummy. They reveal to the partygoers that Larson told them that he and his wife have never had intercourse before, as an attempt to attract them and cheat on his wife.
  - Heartbreaking Lisp
- Aidy Bryant as:
  - Co-Worker
  - Petunia
- Patton Oswalt as Peter Rabbit, a twist-villain rabbit from Easter Island and the father of P3.
- Janina Gavankar as Lakshmi
- Lauren Miller Rogen as:
  - Mrs. Dijonnaise
  - Rivka Spinster
  - Teenage Girl Activist

== Episodes ==
No.	Title	Directed by	Written by	Original release date	Prod. code
1	"Where The Hell is Brent?"	Harry Chaskin	Alexandra Rushfield	December 2, 2021	101
2	"Faces of Meth"	Harry Chaskin	Lisa Goldberg	December 2, 2021	102
3	"Spring Awakening"	Harry Chaskin	Rachna Fruchbom	December 2, 2021	103
4	"The South Pole"	Harry Chaskin	Guy Endore-Kaiser	December 2, 2021	104
5	"Santa's Birthday"	Harry Chaskin	Rochée Jeffrey	December 2, 2021	105
6	"The Announcement"	Harry Chaskin	Ryan Shiraki	December 2, 2021	106
7	"Cracks in the Peppermint"	Harry Chaskin	Dave King and Paul Rust	December 2, 2021	107
8	"Cracks in the Peppermint"	Harry Chaskin	Andrew Gurland	December 2, 2021	108

== Reception ==
Santa Inc. was universally panned by audiences and critics who derided the miniseries' script, tone, messages and humor despite praising the stop-motion animation and voice acting. Daniel D'Addario of Variety wrote that the miniseries' reliance on raunchy humor led to it "feeling dour and heavy, a televised lump of coal". He felt that telling jokes about reindeer being methamphetamine addicts and Mrs. Claus being a stripper "doesn't say anything, really; it just suggests a readiness to provoke". D'Addario was more approving of plot elements about a female character seeking to rise in a hostile workplace.

Writing for The Hollywood Reporter, Daniel Fienberg praised the parody of corporate culture but called the sexual jokes "repetitive and self-satisfied". He also did not find the humor to have good shock value, unlike a recent Christmas special of Big Mouth. Mira Fox of The Forward gave Santa Inc. a negative review, criticizing the massive amount of some raunchy humor and Holocaust jokes, a poor plot, some lazy stereotypes of Jews and an ultimately poor message of the miniseries, saying "You might think that this Christmas series made by two famous Jews would have some greater message about antisemitism or Christianity's hegemony in the U.S. But instead Silverman, too, has reduced Jewishness to a handful of hackneyed stereotypes in Santa, Inc."

Joel Keller in an article for Decider wrote that the miniseries is "more raunchy than it is merry", and came close to being "gratuitously dirty", but praised the story and the miniseries' take on gender politics. Barbara Ellen of The Guardian described the miniseries as "a festive-themed and potty-mouthed Wallace and Gromit" and wrote "I'm not about to argue for comedy with a swear jar, and profanity is to be expected from an adult animation featuring Silverman and Rogen, but in Santa Inc it's such a relentless bombardment of pointless crudity ("It's Christmas fucking Eve"; "You token elf cunt"), the humour is all but flattened, as if by a descending Monty Python foot made of hard old plasticine."

Seth Rogen was the subject to criticism when he claimed that the generally negative reception the miniseries received was review bombing by "tens of thousands of white supremacists". Some viewers also have said that Santa Inc. is very similar to Syfy's The Pole which is another 2021 Canadian-American adult-oriented Christmas-themed satirical black comedy fantasy television miniseries about the political power struggle of becoming Santa Claus. The only difference in The Pole is the rivalry between Santa and his oldest son Jack (also known as "Black Jack") who only wants to become the new Santa so that he could have total control of the North Pole.

== Antisemitic backlash ==
After being uploaded to YouTube, the trailer for Santa Inc., which was released on 22 November 2021, received over 20,000 dislikes, while its comment section had allegedly been the target of brigading by commenters making antisemitic and Holocaust-denial jokes. Commenters targeted Sarah Silverman and Seth Rogen's Jewish background and took aim at the miniseries' supposed "woke" messaging. In response, YouTube disabled the video's comments and hid its dislike count, stating that commenters had violated the site's guidelines against hate speech.

== Soundtrack ==
Santa Inc.

Soundtrack album by Anna Waronker and Steven McDonald
- Released: November 29, 2021
- Recorded: 2021
- Genre: Christmas music
- Length: 0:12
- Label: Lionsgate Records
- Producers: Lionsgate Records; Anna Waronker; Steven McDonald

Anna Waronker television soundtrack chronology
The Republic of Sarah (2021)	Santa Inc. (2021)	Harriet the Spy (2021-2023)

Santa Inc. is the miniseries' soundtrack album of the same name, containing 20 original tracks edited by Todd Dahlhoff and produced and composed by Anna Waronker and Steven McDonald. It was co-produced and released by Lionsgate Records on November 29, 2021.

Track listing

No.	Title	Length
1.	"Santa Inc. Main Theme (Candy's Theme)"	0:49
2.	"Snowflake Snowflake"	1:58
3.	"Stuff My Stocking"	1:15
4.	"Rise (Karaoke Version)" (featuring Sarah Silverman)	0:31
5.	"Leprechaun's Kitchen"	0:21
6.	"J-J-J-Junior"	0:13
7.	"Someone Is at the Door" (featuring Steven McDonald and Jasper Randall)	0:20
8.	"Christmas With Dawn Davenport"	2:16
9.	"Father Son Shlong, Father Son Dong" (featuring Carmen Christopher)	0:55
10.	"Stuff My Stocking (Steakhouse Version)"	1:12
11.	"Poinsettia Park"	1:48
12.	"Candy Cane Lane"	0:58
13.	"You'll Always Have Me (Acoustic Version)" (featuring Carmen Christopher)	1:00
14.	"Easter Is Here"	2:47
15.	"Candy's Theme (A Capella Version)"	0:47
16.	"Shave Party"	1:43
17.	"Candy Superstar"	0:59
18.	"Christmas Is Here / The Walk Out" (featuring Steven McDonald, Jasper Randall, Maria Bamford, Joel Kim Booster, Ryan Shiraki and Harry Chaskin)	1:47
19.	"Rise"	1:03
20.	"Gift of Timmy"	1:30
Total length:		0:12
