= Pilot (Hot Streets) =

- Hot Streets episode
- Comparison between the 2011 animated film We Solve the Crime and the 2016 episode "Pilot"
- Episode no.: Season 1 Episode 1
- Directed by: Brian Wysol
- Written by: Brian Wysol
- Original air date: December 4, 2016
- Running time: 11 minutes

Guest appearances
- Justin Roiland as Random Civilian; Mindy Sterling as Dr. Brainbrook; Eric Bauza as Brain Face/Police Officer #1; Michael McCafferty as Agent Magafferty; Rob Schrab as Steven Davis/Police Officer #2; Kate Freund as Patient; Brian Wysol as J.A.S.O.N.

Episode chronology
← Previous —	Next → "Got a Minute for Love?"

"Pilot" is the television pilot of the Adult Swim television series Hot Streets, which premiered on December 4, 2016. (It had previously been uploaded to the Adult Swim website in August 2016.) It was written and directed by Brian Wysol, who previously created the Channel 101 animated shorts Hot Cross Buns and We Solve the Crime.

The pilot introduces the protagonists of Hot Streets: Agent Mark Branski (voiced by J.D. Ryznar), Agent Donald French (voiced by Scott Chernoff), Jen Sanders (voiced by Chelsea Kane), and Chubbie Webbers (voiced by Justin Roiland).

== Development and production ==
In 2011, writer Brian Wysol created a series of shorts for Dan Harmon and Rob Schrab's Channel 101 including Hot Cross Buns and We Solve the Crime. Wysol said it was a synthesis of the two: "One was a supernatural horror cartoon and the other was a cop show, and they were my favorites [...] I wanted to weave their sensibilities together, so I came up with the idea for this new FBI supernatural investigative show." In 2012, Wysol decided to combine the shorts for Hot Streets.

Production involved Brian Wysol and the Robot Chicken team: co-creator Seth Green, John Harvatine IV, Matthew Senreich, and Eric Towner. Previously, Wysol wrote two Rick and Morty episodes and four Robot Chicken episodes. It was produced by Justin Roiland's Solo Vanity Card Productions, Stoopid Buddy Stoodios, and Williams Street. Rick and Morty co-creator Justin Roiland plays a cowardly talking dog, Chubby Webbers. Animation was created in Burbank, California by Stoopid Buddy Stoodios and Salty Dog Pictures in Ireland and produced using Toon Boom Harmony.

== Broadcast ==
In 2016, Adult Swim uploaded four television pilots: Apollo Gauntlet, Bad Guys, The Hindenburg Explodes!, and Hot Streets. Viewers were asked to vote with a ratings system ranging from "Laugh," "Boo," "Costanza," "Tomatoes," to "Kill This."

== Plot ==
French finds a ghostly baby head which bewilders him. Nonplussed, Branski answers a phone and they are called away. Finding a crime scene, they determine it was by a brain monster which returns and kills. It flees. Cornering two in an alleyway, French reveals a serum to interrogate it. However, Branski opts to punch them. After a brawl, they shoot them repeatedly but run out of bullets. However, the two dispatch the monsters.

At Branski's home, Jen Sanders is grieving over her mom. Branski consoles Jen but he has a brain tumor which will kill him and make her homeless. Jen implores him to see a surgeon. As he leaves, Jen tries talking with her dog Chubbie who is sad too. Chubbie talks to her, but is ignored. Driving, French says there are no brain monsters. Branski says they will take a break and get brain surgery.

At the science center, Branski tells the guard, a masked brain monster, he was recommended by Dr. Steven Davis. Inside, Dr. Brainbrook explains she cloned a piece of his brain which will grow in his neck. The piece will replace the tumor. Elsewhere, Jen and Chubbie investigate Thrifty Medical Experts. Using Branski's phone, Jen finds Dr. Steven Davis has done medical malpractice. Annoyed, he approaches them. Interrogating him, Jen finds out Branski has no tumor but was only diagnosed for the mosnters' plan. Branski and French talk with a patient with similar surgery. Despite her concerns, Branski and French dismiss them. The lump explodes into a brain monster which attacks both Branski and French. Fleeing, they run from the brain monsters. Outside, Jen tells Chubbie to enter the center under disguise. Dressed as a baseball player, Chubbie tries a distraction. It attacks him but Jen kills it. Inside, French tells them they should operate before he turns into a monster. The monster appears in his neck and French interrogates it. Telling French Dr. Brainbrook's plan, French asks how to remove it. The antidote is in Dr. Brainbrook's lab but is only accessible via teleportation. Chubbie volunteers. It malfunctions with two appearing with different densities. The interphasic one proceeds. Near the antidote, Chubbie solidifies but is torched. Running for water, he collides with a brain container. While the brains are laughing, Chubbie fights them. Before dying, the brain implant asks if they may have sex with Jen. Branski declines and stabs it.

== Cast ==
The cast of "Pilot", in order of the characters' first appearances.
Voice	Role	Notes
J.D. Ryznar	Mark Branski	An FBI agent who investigates supernatural phenomena
Scott Chernoff	Donald French	Another FBI agent who investigates supernatural phenomena
Chelsea Kane	Jen Saunders	Mark Branski's niece
Justin Roiland	Chubby Webbers	A cowardly dog

== Reception ==
Den of Geek!'s Daniel Kurland praised the pilot, saying "Hot Streets is a crazy ride down an unpredictable neighborhood, but you'll love every minute of it." Anticipating "Got a Minute for Love?", Anglophenia's Nick Levin described it as "well-received."

=== Viewing figures ===
On its first showing, "Pilot" was seen by 0.877 million viewers.
