= Hot Streets (TV series) =

2016–2019 American TV series

- Created by: Brian Wysol
- Directed by: Pete Michels
- Voices of: J.D. Ryznar; Scott Chernoff; Chelsea Kane; Justin Roiland
- Composer: Brian Wysol
- Country of origin: United States
- Original language: English
- No. of seasons: 2
- No. of episodes: 20 (and 1 pilot)

Production
- Executive producers: Seth Green; John Harvatine IV; Justin Roiland; Matthew Senreich; Brian Wysol
- Running time: 11 minutes
- Production companies: Stoopid Buddy Stoodios; Justin Roiland's Solo Vanity Card Productions!; Williams Street

Original release
- Network: Adult Swim
- Release: December 4, 2016 – March 24, 2019

Hot Streets is an American adult animated television series that was created by Brian Wysol. The series surrounds the supernatural investigations of FBI agent Mark Branski, who works with his partner Donald French, Branski's niece Jen, and her cowardly talking dog, Chubbie Webbers. The series was produced by Stoopid Buddy Stoodios in association with Williams Street and Justin Roiland's Solo Vanity Card Productions!. The series pilot aired on December 4, 2016, and officially premiered on January 14, 2018. It was renewed for a second season on May 7, 2018, which premiered on February 24, 2019.

On May 16, 2019, Adult Swim canceled the series after two seasons.

== Plot ==
Mark Branski (J.D. Ryznar) is an FBI agent along with his partner Donald French (Scott Chernoff). The two collaborate with Branski's niece Jen (Chelsea Kane) and her cowardly talking dog, Chubbie Webbers (Justin Roiland), to investigate paranormal phenomena. A recurring theme of the show is how they mostly go up against nasty, nasty monsters and wacky forces of evil, yet sometimes kill good-intentioned "adversaries" without a second thought, often based on just following orders, heated emotions or the Bible.

== Characters ==
- Mark Branski (voiced by J.D. Ryznar) is an FBI agent who is a 21-year veteran and is considered the best at his job. He has a somewhat eccentric and aloof attitude towards the various missions and events and tends to disregard the feelings and opinions of those around him. Branski has a surprising knowledge of many things and partakes in various surreal activities. He gave Chubbie Webbers his name after Jen adopted him.
- Donald French (voiced by Scott Chernoff) is Branski's younger partner and essentially everyone's whipping boy. French is effeminate and more pessimistic compared to Branski, but is always trying to prove his worth. In some instances he is shown to be smarter than his senior partner, but more often, he is incompetent in everything he tries. He desires to have his own office despite being told that there are no free office rooms anymore.
- Jen Sanders (voiced by Chelsea Kane) is Branski's niece. Her parents died previously, her mother having died of blood cancer, and she constantly mentions that Branski is her only living relative. She confides in her dog Chubbie Webbers whom she loves dearly. Jen is more mentally capable than either Branski or French, but is usually put to the sideline by her uncle whom she still cares for.
- Chubbie Webbers (voiced by Justin Roiland) is Jen's pet talking bloodhound who speaks with a garbled dog like voice (à la Scooby-Doo, though it becomes more intelligible in Season 2) and has an extended family (à la Snoopy). While Chubbie Webbers is very resourceful with a bisexual preference, both his slightly psychotic episodes and addiction problems tend to go unnoticed by the others. In the episode "The Final Stand", due to using the Badge Swords in "Super Agent", Chubbie fought and won a battle against blood cancer. "Super Agent 2" reveals that as a puppy, he was another girl's Christmas gift (given the name Wags), but he fled their burning house, unable to save the family. Soon after, Jen adopted him after her mother narrowly avoided hitting him while driving.
- Soo Park (voiced by Ming-Na Wen) is Branski and French's boss in Season 1 who takes her job seriously. She has little patience for Branski's often idiotic attitude. After her firing in the Season 2 premiere, she becomes suspicious of her replacement and begins investigating him.
- John Wayne JetWayne Junior (Jet Jr.) (voiced by Ernie Hudson) is Baranski and French's boss in Season 2. He is a living miniature jet plane who can shoot energy from his eyes that transforms those they hit into crystals. He has a higher tolerance for Branski than Soo Park and is far more eccentric, though he encourages his agents to complete their missions "tip to the lip", meaning as well done as possible. The season 2 finale reveals even though he is physically over 700 years old, for his species he's only a 12 year old, which explains all of his odd decisions and personality.

== Production ==
Prior to Hot Streets, Brian Wysol created a series of shorts for Dan Harmon and Rob Schrab's Channel 101 including Hot Cross Buns and We Solve the Crime. Wysol said Hot Streets was a synthesis of the two: "One was a supernatural horror cartoon and the other was a cop show, and they were my favorites [...] I wanted to weave their sensibilities together, so I came up with the idea for this new FBI supernatural investigative show." In 2012, Wysol decided to combine them for Hot Streets.

Wysol was employed on several Adult Swim series, including the second season of Rick and Morty as a story editor and Robot Chicken as a writer. Prior to that he created several web series for Smosh's Shut Up! Cartoons. In March 2017, the network announced that they committed Wysol's pitch for Hot Streets to a full series, along with Myles Langlois' Apollo Gauntlet. Stoopid Buddy Stoodios and Williams Street helm production. The former company's founders, Seth Green and Matthew Senreich—both the creators of Robot Chicken—announced that production for the pilot of Hot Streets was forthcoming in May 2015; it continued into April 2016. Green, Senreich, and Wysol are the series' executive producers, as well as fellow Robot Chicken staffer Eric Towner, John Harvatine IV, and Rick and Morty co-creator Justin Roiland. Each episode of Hot Streets is eleven minutes long. Animation services were provided by Salty Dog Pictures for the show's first season.

== Episodes ==
Series overview
Season	Episodes	Originally released	
Season	Episodes	First released	Last released
Pilot		December 4, 2016	
1	10	January 14, 2018	February 11, 2018
2	10	February 24, 2019	March 24, 2019
Short		December 12, 2017	

=== Pilot (2016) ===
Title	Directed by	Written by	Original release date	U.S. viewers (millions)
"Pilot"	Brian Wysol	Brian Wysol	December 4, 2016	0.877
Voice cast: J. D. Ryznar as Mark Branski, Scott Chernoff as Donald French, Chelsea Kane as Jen, and Justin Roiland as Chubbie Webbers

=== Season 1 (2018) ===
No. overall	No. in season	Title	Directed by	Written by	Original release date	U.S. viewers (millions)
1	1	"Got a Minute for Love?"	Pete Michels	Brenan Campbell and Brian Wysol	January 14, 2018	0.84
Jen falls in love after being saved by a Korean student. Meanwhile, the rest of the team hunts down mummies.
2	2	"Snake Island"	Pete Michels	Mike McCafferty and Brian Wysol	January 14, 2018	0.81
Chubby Webbers gets addicted to "Murder Powder" as the team is called in to close a portal to Snake Island.
3	3	"Super Agent"	Pete Michels	Nick Corirossi and Chales Ingram	January 21, 2018	0.80
Chubby Webbers accidentally releases an alien who turns Outer Space into Every Space.
4	4	"The Egg"	Pete Michels	Mike McCafferty	January 21, 2018	0.66
After getting his head shot off by an alien, Branski finds himself constantly reincarnating from a chicken egg.
5	5	"Nursery Rhyme Land"	Pete Michels	Nick Corirossi	January 28, 2018	0.69
French is kidnapped by a weird cat monster after playing a cursed record, forcing the Hot Streets crew to travel to a world of nursery rhymes and solve the riddles of the Three Blind Mice to save him.
6	6	"Operation Large and in Charge"	Pete Michels	Brenan Campbell	January 28, 2018	0.64
A large monster is ravaging the city and the hope of mankind rests on the shoulders of French, who has to rely on his old company to save the world.
7	7	"The Bractegon"	Pete Michels	Charles Ingram	February 4, 2018	0.81
Branski and French hunt Toilet Bowl Monsters in the sewers. Meanwhile, Jen accidentally stumbles onto the secrets of the Bractegon.
8	8	"The Ballad of Autumn Gold"	Pete Michels	Mike McCafferty and Brian Wysol	February 5, 2018	N/A
The Hot Streets gang is sent back in time to the 1800s to stop notorious criminal Black Bart from stealing all the horses. NOTE: This episode was supposed to air on February 4, 2018 along with "The Bractegon"; however, Adult Swim accidentally played a repeat of the latter episode at 12:15 instead, so instead, both episodes aired for the entirety of the following week, replacing Robot Chicken for the week.
9	9	"Squid of the Dead"	Pete Michels	Mike McCafferty	February 11, 2018	0.71
Branski is chosen to sign a peace treaty between humanity and the Vek, but the Vek ambassador has other plans.
10	10	"The Final Stand"	Pete Michels	Brenan Campbell and Brian Wysol	February 11, 2018	0.66
Hot Streets faces the return of their greatest foe, Count Dracula, who challenges the group to a baseball game for control of the Hot Streets headquarters.

=== Season 2 (2019) ===
No. overall	No. in season	Title	Directed by	Written by	Original release date	U.S. viewers (millions)
11	1	"Creamy Zeus"	Pete Michels	Brenan Campbell	February 24, 2019	0.55
The new boss of Hot Streets, Jet Junior, sends clones of the Hot Streets crew to stop notorious pirate Creamy Zeus from plundering America. However, the real French accidentally gets switched out with his clone.
12	2	"The Moon Masters"	Pete Michels	Mike McCafferty	February 24, 2019	0.52
After a tense moment with Yakuza boss Crimson Dagger, the Hot Streets crew is teleported to a space casino to fight for the rights to the Moon in a space race.
13	3	"Super Agent 2"	Pete Michels	Brenan Campbell	March 3, 2019	0.67
An alien calls upon Chubby Webbers (as "Super Agent") to save his planet of Rios 9 from an evil dictator.
14	4	"Bad Boy Bugs"	Pete Michels	Nick Corirossi and Brian Wysol	March 3, 2019	0.57
The Hot Streets gang attempt to take out Krawler, leader of the Bad Boy Bugs, but French accidentally shoots a Good Boy Bug named Magical John. Meanwhile, Jen becomes a medical test subject to earn money, and meets an old foe.
15	5	"Tip to the Lip"	Pete Michels	Nick Corirossi and Mike McCafferty	March 10, 2019	0.73
French is given his first leading job: stop a large missile from destroying Mars. However, his ego leads himself and the team into hot danger.
16	6	"Camp Hot Streets"	Pete Michels	Charles Ingram and Brian Wysol	March 10, 2019	0.64
Hot Streets hosts its annual summer camp while Branski tries to get Jen back together with her ex-boyfriend Matt.
17	7	"Blood Barn"	Pete Michels	Charles Ingram	March 17, 2019	0.73
Branski and French are disguised as chickens to win an intergalactic cockfight called Blood Barn. Meanwhile, Jen is posed an important question by Jet Junior, "Why are things the way they are?"
18	8	"The Black Box"	Pete Michels	Mike McCafferty and Brian Wysol	March 17, 2019	0.64
Jet Junior leads the Hot Streets crew to erase a portion of his black box in his hometown of Deathworld, racing against former Hot Streets director Soo Park who wants to expose his secrets.
19	9	"Hot Streets Disease"	Pete Michels	Brenan Campbell	March 24, 2019	0.67
Branski tries to take down the evil Porcelini Man but suffers from "Hot Streets Disease," a crippling illness that will result in his death by pony farts if he solves one more case.
20	10	"Hot Streets Begins"	Pete Michels	Nick Corirossi	March 24, 2019	0.59
Chubby Webbers (as "Professor Wags") sends a message from the past that a "Brown Hole" is about to destroy the world, but is cut off before he can finish. Meanwhile, Hot Streets has been taken over by a smelly man named Stinkeroni, who uses Hot Streets to stink up the world. The old Hot Streets crew must unite to find out Chubby Webbers' full message to turn things back to normal.

=== Short (2017) ===
No.	Title	Directed by	Written by	Original release date	U.S. viewers (millions)
1	"People Are Disappearing"	Unknown	Unknown	December 12, 2017 (YouTube)	N/A
The Hot Streets gang's boss begins to debrief them on a case involving people disappearing, but the meeting gets sidetracked when French himself suddenly disappears...to go to the bathroom.

== Release and reception ==
Hot Streets premiered on Adult Swim on January 14, 2018. The pilot episode aired on December 4, 2016, and was previously released on Adult Swim's official website in August 2016, along with the pilots for three other prospective television series, including Apollo Gauntlet. Viewers could give feedback on each pilot with five buttons marked with reactions.
