= Buddy Thunderstruck =

American children's stop-motion comedy television series

- Genre: Comedy; Stop-motion
- Created by: Ryan Wiesbrock
- Written by: Thomas Krajewski; Chris Pearson; Dave Lewman; Jennifer Muro
- Directed by: Eric Towner; John Harvatine IV; Harry Chaskin; Alex Kamer
- Starring: Brian Atkinson; Ted Raimi; Harry Chaskin; Justin Michael; Debi Derryberry; Philip Maurice Hayes; Leigh Kelly; J.D. Ryznar; Nick Shakoour; Ryan Wiesbrock; Clark Wiesbrock
- Theme music composer: David Padrutt; Ryan Wiesbrock
- Composer: David Padrutt
- Country of origin: United States
- Original language: English
- No. of series: 1
- No. of episodes: 12 (23 segments) + interactive special

Production
- Executive producers: Jeffrey Weiss; Zev Weiss; Sean Gorman; Ryan Wiesbrock; Peter Baghdassarian; Karen Vermeulen; Seth Green; John Harvatine IV; Matthew Senreich; Eric Towner; Ed Horasz; Andy Yeatman
- Editors: Jenny McKibben (episodes 1–18); Clayton Baker (episodes 17–23 + interactive special); Jessica Shobe (episode 18)
- Running time: 23 minutes
- Production companies: Stoopid Buddy Stoodios; American Greetings

Original release
- Network: Netflix
- Release: March 10 – July 14, 2017

Buddy Thunderstruck is an American children's stop motion comedy television series created by Ryan Wiesbrock for Netflix, produced by American Greetings and Stoopid Buddy Stoodios and written by Tom Krajewski. The series stars Brian Atkinson, Ted Raimi, Harry Chaskin and Debi Derryberry. The first season was released on Netflix on March 10, 2017. When promoting the first series Netflix billed it as the 'outrageous, high-octane adventures of Buddy Thunderstruck, a truck-racing dog who brings guts and good times to the town of Greasepit'.

== Premise ==
The series tells about the hard-driving trucking adventures of Buddy the dog driver and his ferret mechanic sidekick Darnell the ferret.

== Cast ==
- Brian Atkinson as Buddy Thunderstruck: Greasepit's number one racer at the Greasepit County Speedway.
- Ted Raimi as:
  - Darnell Fetzervalve: Buddy's genius mechanic and best friend.
  - Belvedere Moneybags: A villainous newcomer in Greasepit who challenges Buddy to a race.
- Debi Derryberry as:
  - Muncie Thunderstruck: Buddy's cousin and owner of the Concho Bolo restaurant, she is also secretly the mysterious racer Flossie Trophydash.
  - Mrs. Weaselbrat: The loving wife of Mr. Weaselbrat and Buddy's second biggest fan.
  - Mama Possum: The mother of three baby possums who often get themselves into danger.
  - Really Old Lady: An old woman who works at the town bank.
  - Scout: Nick's daughter who often assaults Buddy and Darnell to buy her cookies.
- Justin Michael as:
  - Tex Arkana Jr.: Buddy's rival who always loses at the Greasepit County Speedway.
  - Mr. Weaselbrat: Buddy's number one biggest fan in Greasepit.
  - Robby Burgles: The local burglar that often works for Big Tex to "reposses" valuables from his customers .
- Harry Chaskin as:
  - Big Tex: The greedy business owner of the Gold Brick Pawnshop who wants Thunderstruck Trucking out of business.
  - Jacko Valltrades: A Jackalope who works in various jobs such as a doctor, judge, criminal, or talk show host.
- Philip Maurice Hayes as Sheriff Cannonball: The stubborn sheriff of Greasepit that continually tries to arrest Buddy for his reckless driving.
- Leigh Kelly as Deputy Hoisenberry: Cannonball's childish and gullible young deputy.
- Nick Shakoour as:
  - Artichoke: A biker with an explosive temper who works at his karate dojo.
  - Auntie Uncle: Buddy's aunt and the owner of Thunderstruck Trucking.
- Ryan Wiesbrock as:
  - Leroy: The owner of Zeil's Truck Stop which usually gets blown up by Buddy's antics.
  - Handsome Joe: A feral computer programmer who speaks in unintelligible gibberish.
  - The Beavers: Three beavers that work for Muncie at the Concho Bolo.
- JD Ryznar as Nick the New Guy: The new announcer of the Greasepit County Speedway.
- Clark Wiesbrock as the Baby Possums: Three babies of Mama Possum that always get themselves into dangerous situations.
- Thomas Krajewski as Nightmare Jerky Stick
- Todd McClintock as Live Action Buddy Thunderstruck
- Chester Lee as Live Action Tex Jr.

== Episodes ==
=== Series overview ===
| Season | Segments | Episodes | Originally released |
|---|---|---|---|
| Season 1 | 23 | 12 | March 10, 2017 |
| Special | — | 1 | July 14, 2017 |

=== Season 1 (2017) ===
| No. overall | No. in season | Title | Directed by | Written by | Original release date | Prod. code |
|---|---|---|---|---|---|---|
| 1 | 1 | "Buddy Double" | Eric Towner & John Harvatine IV | Thomas Krajewski | March 10, 2017 | 101 |
| 1 | 1 | "Beaver Dam Fast Pizza" | Eric Towner & John Harvatine IV | Thomas Krajewski | March 10, 2017 | 101 |
A damned Buddy imposter wreaks havoc and leaves the real one in a very bad situation. Buddy confronts the pizza delivery beavers.
| 2 | 2 | "To Protect and Swerve" | Eric Towner | Thomas Krajewski | March 10, 2017 | 102 |
| 2 | 2 | "Robo-Truck of the Future" | Eric Towner | Thomas Krajewski | March 10, 2017 | 102 |
Sheriff Cannonball steps down and Buddy replaces him at work. Buddy thinks his truck is talking to him who is Darnell in inside his truck.
| 3 | 3 | "Get the Hock Out" | Eric Towner | Chris Pearson | March 10, 2017 | 103 |
| 3 | 3 | "Thunderstruck Rad Cab" | Eric Towner | Dave Lewman | March 10, 2017 | 103 |
When Auntie Uncle loses all her furniture to debt to Big Tex, Buddy takes a job from Big Tex as a repo man to get his own stuff back. With the Speedway closed, Buddy tries to get money for bills by becoming a taxi driver. Big Tex uses this to try to steal Buddy's driving secrets.
| 4 | 4 | "Thunder Fu" | Eric Towner | Thomas Krajewski | March 10, 2017 | 104 |
| 4 | 4 | "Funny Money" | Eric Towner | Thomas Krajewski | March 10, 2017 | 104 |
Buddy and Darnell make up "Thunder Fu" after being beat up by a child, they openingly mock Artichoke for his love of Karate. Thinking he can be a better artist than Muncie, Buddy begins making art that looks like money which Cannonball mistakes as forgery.
| 5 | 5 | "Moneybags and His Monster" | Eric Towner | Thomas Krajewski | March 10, 2017 | 105 |
| 5 | 5 | "Sneezing Fits of Death" | Eric Towner | Thomas Krajewski | March 10, 2017 | 105 |
The creepy guy following Buddy finally explains he is Buddy's rival. When Buddy will not race him, Moneybags trains Tex Junior to beat him. When Buddy, Darnell, and Tex Junior start sneezing, Jacko diagnoses them with one week left to live.
| 6 | 6 | "Truck Cab in the Woods" | Eric Towner & Harry Chaskin | Thomas Krajewski | March 10, 2017 | 106 |
| 6 | 6 | "Truck Stop Clerks" | Eric Towner & Harry Chaskin | Thomas Krajewski | March 10, 2017 | 106 |
While stranded in the woods, Buddy and Darnell think they are being haunted by an evil presence. Truck stop owner Leroy lets Buddy and Darnell watch his shop while he is away.
| 7 | 7 | "Haters of the Lost Arcade" | Alex Kamer | Thomas Krajewski | March 10, 2017 | 107 |
| 7 | 7 | "Stunt Fever" | Alex Kamer | Thomas Krajewski | March 10, 2017 | 107 |
Buddy and Tex Junior start a competition to see who can beat a poorly made racing arcade game. Buddy starts his own stunt show, but Tex Junior attempts his own stunt show to surpass Buddy's popularity.
| 8 | 8 | "Cannonballistic" | Harry Chaskin | Thomas Krajewski | March 10, 2017 | 108 |
| 8 | 8 | "Mayor May Not" | Harry Chaskin | Jennifer Muro | March 10, 2017 | 108 |
Cannonball quits as sheriff and takes up odd jobs around Greasepit. Buddy and Darnell harass him until they realize they miss him as sheriff. When Buddy still won't race his self-proclaimed rival, Moneybags runs for mayor to legislate himself into race.
| 9 | 9 | "Hit and Dumb" | Harry Chaskin | Thomas Krajewski | March 10, 2017 | 109 |
| 9 | 9 | "Babysitters Yo!" | Harry Chaskin | Thomas Krajewski | March 10, 2017 | 109 |
Sheriff Cannonball hires Darnell to try to prove Buddy guilty of a vehicular accident. After Tex Junior locks himself out of his house, Buddy and Darnell try to teach him to care for himself.
| 10 | 10 | "Buddy Shreds" | Harry Chaskin | Thomas Krajewski | March 10, 2017 | 110 |
| 10 | 10 | "Opposite of Awesome" | Harry Chaskin | Thomas Krajewski | March 10, 2017 | 110 |
Buddy uses Darnell's recorded guitar riffs to fake it in a new rock band. When Buddy hears people lovingly mock him for being extreme, he turns boring so no one can think he is weird.
| 11 | 11 | "A Bro for Weaselbrat" | Harry Chaskin | Thomas Krajewski | March 10, 2017 | 111 |
| 11 | 11 | "Health Nuts" | Harry Chaskin | Thomas Krajewski | March 10, 2017 | 111 |
When Buddy's number one fan Weaselbrat realizes he doesn't have a best friend, Buddy and Darnell feel they need to find him one. Buddy doesn't want to share his truck stop snacks, so fakes being healthy so people will copy him.
| 12 | 12 | "Moneybags Changes Everything" | Harry Chaskin | Thomas Krajewski | March 10, 2017 | 112 |
Moneybags realizes Darnell is a great mechanic and tricks Darnell into building him a car to help him beat Buddy's truck the Rabble Rouser. Buddy becomes depressed and thinks he cannot win without Darnell.

=== Interactive special (2017) ===
| No. overall | No. in season | Title | Directed by | Written by | Original release date | Prod. code |
|---|---|---|---|---|---|---|
| 13 | 1 | "The Maybe Pile" | Harry Chaskin | Thomas Krajewski | July 14, 2017 | 113 |
Champion truck-racing dog Buddy and his handyman ferret pal Darnell test potentially awesome (but mostly terrible) ideas in this interactive adventure.

== Awards and nominations ==
| Year | Award | Category | Nominee | Result | Ref. |
|---|---|---|---|---|---|
| 2018 | Emmy Award | Outstanding Art Direction / Set Direction / Scenic Design | Buddy Thunderstruck | Nominated | |
| 2018 | Emmy Award | Outstanding Cinematography | Buddy Thunderstruck | Nominated | |
| 2018 | Annie Award | Best Animated Television/Broadcast Production For Children | Buddy Thunderstruck | Nominated | |
| 2018 | Annie Award | Outstanding Achievement for Character Design in an Animated Television/ Broadcast Production | Buddy Thunderstruck | Nominated | |
