= SuperMansion =

American animated television series

- Genre: Animated sitcom; Adult animation; Superhero; Science fantasy
- Created by: Matthew Senreich; Zeb Wells
- Starring: Bryan Cranston; Keegan-Michael Key; Heidi Gardner; Tucker Gilmore; Zeb Wells; Jillian Bell; Tom Root; Chris Pine; Breckin Meyer; Yvette Nicole Brown
- Composer: Kurt Oldman
- Country of origin: United States
- Original language: English
- No. of seasons: 3
- No. of episodes: 41 (+ 5 specials) (list of episodes)

Production
- Executive producers: Zeb Wells; Matthew Senreich; Seth Green; John Harvatine IV; Eric Towner; Bryan Cranston; James Degus
- Running time: 22 minutes
- Production companies: Stoop!d Monkey; Stoopid Buddy Stoodios; Moonshot Entertainment; Sony Pictures Television

Original release
- Network: Crackle; Adult Swim (pilot)
- Release: October 8, 2015 – May 9, 2019

SuperMansion is an American adult animated sitcom created by Matthew Senreich and Zeb Wells for Crackle. The series stars Bryan Cranston, Heidi Gardner, Tucker Gilmore, Keegan-Michael Key, Tom Root, Yvette Nicole Brown, Zeb Wells, and Jillian Bell. The series premiered on Crackle on October 8, 2015. The series was renewed for a third and final season which was released on May 7, 2018. The series was removed from Crackle after it was fully sold to Chicken Soup for the Soul Entertainment in 2020.

== Plot ==
The League of Freedom is a superhero group that is led by the aging superhero Titanium Rex. From their base called SuperMansion in the fictional city of Storm City, Titanium Rex and his fellow superheroes Black Saturn, American Ranger, Jewbot/Robobot, Cooch, and Brad struggle to keep the team relevant when occasionally visited by the government accountant Sgt. Agony even if it involves fighting an assortment of supervillains like Dr. Devizo as well as Titanium Rex's daughter Lex Lightning.

In season two, Dr. Devizo and Lex Lightning form the Injustice Club in order to combat the League of Freedom. In addition, the League of Freedom deals with a Subtopian invasion led by Titanium Rex's older brother Titanium Dax.

In season three, the League of Freedom has to share the SuperMansion with the Injustice Club in light of Dr. Devizo helping to stop the Subtopian invasion.

== Cast ==
- Bryan Cranston as Titanium Rex
- Keegan-Michael Key as American Ranger, Sgt. Agony
- Heidi Gardner as Cooch
- Tucker Gilmore as Black Saturn
- Zeb Wells as Jewbot/Robobot, The Groaner
- Jillian Bell as Titanium Lex/Lex Lightning
- Tom Root as Brad
- Chris Pine as Dr. Devizo, Robo-Dino
- Breckin Meyer as Courtney/Ringler
- Yvette Nicole Brown as Zenith/Portia Jones

== Episodes ==
Season	Episodes	Originally released	
Season	Episodes	First released	Last released
1	13	October 8, 2015	December 17, 2015
2	10	February 16, 2017	April 20, 2017
3	18	May 7, 2018	May 9, 2019
Specials	5	December 8, 2016	April 18, 2019

== Production ==
SuperMansion began life as a 12-minute pilot for Adult Swim, under the original name Übermansion where, along with several other pilots (including King Star King and Mr. Pickles, both of which were eventually greenlit), it competed for which pilot would be turned into Adult Swim's next series. The pilot won and aired (along with the pilots to King Star King and Mr. Pickles) on August 25, 2013. For unknown reasons, the series moved to Crackle instead with the name change from Übermansion to SuperMansion.

On April 14, 2015, Sony announced that the stop-motion animated series was being developed by Crackle, which Bryan Cranston would voice and executive produce with his Moon Shot Entertainment. Thirteen episodes were being produced, and also starring Seth Green, Keegan-Michael Key, and Jillian Bell. Matthew Senreich and Zeb Wells wrote and would executive produce the series, while other executive producers would be Green, John Harvatine IV, Eric Towner, and James Degus, while Stoopid Buddy Stoodios would produce. The first trailer was released on July 9, 2015, and the other cast included Senreich, Wells, Heidi Gardner, Tom Root, Tucker Gilmore and some other guest stars.

For the show's second season, Arby's signed a product placement deal with the series as part of a broader deal with Crackle. In addition, Arby's was shown to be next door to the abandoned pizza restaurant which the Injustice Club uses as their hideout.

== Broadcast ==
The series had its television premiere on January 1, 2017 on Adult Swim.

In France, the series premiered on MCM on April 17, 2019, airing both French dub and English audio subtitled.

== Reception ==
On review aggregator website Rotten Tomatoes, the series' first season has a 40% Tomatometer with an average rating of 5.8/10, based on 5 reviews. On Metacritic, which uses a weighted average, assigned the first season a score of 59 out of 100, based on 6 critics, indicating "mixed or average" reviews.

== Home media ==
Season 1 was released on DVD on October 11, 2016. Season 2 was only released on DVD on September 12, 2018, in Australia.
