= Crossing Swords =

2020s American adult animated comedy TV series

- Genre: Adventure; Animated sitcom; Black comedy; Fantasy
- Created by: John Harvatine IV and Tom Root
- Directed by: John Harvatine IV
- Voices of: Nicholas Hoult; Luke Evans; Alanna Ubach; Adam Pally; Tara Strong; Tony Hale; Adam Ray; Seth Green; Breckin Meyer; Wendi McLendon-Covey
- Composer: Randall Crissman
- Country of origin: United States
- Original language: English
- No. of seasons: 2
- No. of episodes: 20

Production
- Executive producers: John Harvatine IV; Tom Root; Seth Green; Matthew Senreich; Eric Towner
- Producer: Mario De Jesus
- Cinematography: Helder K. Sun
- Editor: Clayton Baker
- Running time: 22 minutes
- Production companies: Buddy System Studios; Tom Is Awesome; Stoopid Buddy Stoodios; Sony Pictures Television

Original release
- Network: Hulu
- Release: June 12, 2020 – December 10, 2021

Crossing Swords is an American adult stop-motion animated sitcom created by John Harvatine IV and Tom Root for Hulu. The series premiered on June 12, 2020. Six days after its premiere, the series was renewed for a second season, which premiered on December 10, 2021.

In June 2022, Harvatine IV announced that Hulu cancelled the series after two seasons.

== Premise ==
Crossing Swords follows "Patrick, a goodhearted peasant who lands a coveted squire position at the royal castle. His dream job quickly turns into a nightmare when he learns his beloved kingdom is run by a hornet's nest of horny monarchs, crooks and charlatans. Even worse, Patrick's valor made him the black sheep in his family, and now his criminal siblings have returned to make his life hell. War, murder, full frontal nudity—who knew brightly colored peg people led such exciting lives?"

== Cast and characters ==
=== Main ===
- Nicholas Hoult as Patrick, the main protagonist
- Luke Evans as King Merriman
- Alanna Ubach as Queen Tulip, Merriman's wife
- Adam Pally as Broth, Patrick's best friend and fellow knight
- Tara Strong as Coral, Patrick's pirate sister
  - Strong also voices Trina Franklin, a plucky peasant girl
- Tony Hale as Blarney, Patrick's clown brother
- Adam Ray as Ruben, Patrick's bandit brother
- Seth Green as Blinkerquartz, the Castle's Wizard
- Breckin Meyer as Glenn, Patrick's father
- Wendi McLendon-Covey as Doreen, Patrick's mother

=== Recurring ===
- Yvette Nicole Brown as Sgt. Meghan, trainer of the knights
- Maya Erskine as Princess Blossom, Merriman and Tulip's spoiled daughter
- Ben Schwartz as Keefer, Blossom's (dead) boyfriend
- Rob Corddry as The Old King, Merriman's insane father whom he dethroned
- Jameela Jamil as Sloane, who is a maid in the castle and Patrick's love interest.

=== Guest ===
- Alfred Molina as Robin Hood, Ruben's rival (Episode: "Hot Tub Death Machine")
- Natasha Lyonne as Norah, a Yeti. (Episode: "The Snow Job")
- Jane Lynch as Donna

== Episodes ==
Season	Episodes	Originally released
1	10	June 12, 2020
2	10	December 10, 2021

=== Season 1 (2020) ===
No. overall	No. in season	Title	Directed by	Written by	Original release date
1	1	"Pilot"	John Harvatine IV	John Harvatine IV; Tom Root	June 12, 2020
Patrick is a peasant lad who is bullied by his older siblings: Coral, a notorious pirate queen; Blarney, a successful clown; and Ruben, a dashing rogue. Patrick yearns to be a knight, though his parents belittle his dreams, and enters a jousting tournament held by the raucous King Merriman. He befriends the optimistic Broth who has failed eight years in a row and quickly forms a rivalry with a knight named Holden. In each round of competition, Patrick uses his experiences to help him succeed: tucking back his genitals to withstand low blows, exposing a trick from the magician Blinkerquartz, and lying to dissuade the sexually voracious Queen Tulip (though she is turned on by everything but simple refusal). But when Patrick realizes that he cannot win fairly in an unfair system, he gets fed up, calls everyone out on their morals, then uses a firework rocket in the joust to defeat Holden. Despite the rebuke and the blatant cheating, King Merriman accepts him as his squire nonetheless. Patrick returns home where his siblings mockingly tell him that they are in his life forever.
2	2	"Hot Tub Death Machine"	John Harvatine IV	Tom Root	June 12, 2020
On the squires' first training with Sgt. Meghan, Patrick refuses to kill and eat fairies and is hazed. King Merriman asks Patrick for advice on how to bring his polls up and Patrick inadvertently gives him the idea of holding a public execution using a complicated machine. The squires, minus Patrick, are taken to Naked Lady Island by Meghan, only to find out that it is a training exercise to fight a Medusa. Ruben and Coral learn of the execution and try to have their names be offered up as a way of getting recognition. Patrick is forced to pick a criminal to be executed all while being mocked by Sprinkles, the fairy he spared. Patrick eventually settles on executing a prisoner named Charles Reinhold, only for him to be revealed to be Robin Hood who has given money to all the peasants. The execution machine is activated and Robin Hood is graphically killed. Sprinkles is killed as well, but not before revealing that he sold out his kind. Merriman's polls rise out of fear and the squires return traumatized, except Broth who was turned on by the Medusa.
3	3	"What's Kraken?"	John Harvatine IV	Sean Lavery	June 12, 2020
Patrick gets his father Glenn's respect by booking him on a cruise dedicating to watching Krackens, but a coup staged by activists throws a monkey wrench in things.
4	4	"In the Line of Squire"	John Harvatine IV	Amy Reed	June 12, 2020
Patrick, Broth, King Merriman, and Blinkerquartz uncover an assassin who is targeting high profile lords and ladies in the kingdom. Princess Blossom has returned from boarding school. She wants to attend the Beast Feast music festival. King Merriman and Queen Tulip, fearing for her safety forbid her from going and put Patrick in charge of her safety. Princess Blossom escapes from her room to go to the music festival. Patrick and Broth follow her to protect her. Princess Blossom falls in love with Keefer, the lead musician of Testa-Kyll. Blossom gets ready to attend Keefer's headlining performance in the evening. The assassin attempts to kill her while she is getting ready. Fortunately, Patrick is there to foil the attempt without Blossom even being aware. Unfortunately her tent is ruined in the turmoil and she blames Patrick. Angrily, Blossom heads off to the concert and Patrick follows, wary of the assassin still. At the concert, Blossom is invited onto the stage to perform with Keefer. While on stage the assassin fires a crossbow bolt at her. Luckily, Patrick is there to jump in the way and foil the attempt once more. Blossom is thankful. Unfortunately, while all this was going on, Keefer stumbles into the haunted iron maiden prop on stage and is killed.
5	5	"Let Them Eat Clown"	John Harvatine IV	Sean Lavery; Maggie Monahan; Amy Reed	June 12, 2020
Patrick accompanies Merriman to an assembly of fellow hedonistic lords that soon results in Patrick finding out that Merriman's father, the Old King, is being contained in a storage castle. Blarney attends the assembly, thinking he’s providing entertainment, but it turns out he’s going to be hunted for sport.
6	6	"My Super Sweet Period Party"	John Harvatine IV	Maggie Monahan	June 12, 2020
Princess Blossom causes some trouble at a bonfire with some of her friends. Blossom returns to the castle, and it is discovered that she is having her first period. Her parents want to throw her a period party. She meets up with the ghost of Keefer to make out. At their makeout spot she meets an imprisoned Aunt Donna who tells her that at the period party she will be given a chastity belt or be locked up in a tower for refusing. Blossom wants to lose her virginity to Keefer before this happens. Aunt Donna reveals that there is a way to bring Keefer back to life for an hour. The information can be obtained in the restricted section of the library. Meanwhile Holden has returned to join the other squires. It is revealed that there will be circumcision inspection for the squired to pass. Patrick is not circumcised so he sets about finding a way to remedy that. Patrick and Blossom end up meeting each other in the library and Patrick decides to help Blossom. They obtain the ingredients for the ritual and return to Aunt Donna. They perform the ritual but Aunt Donna betrays them and uses it to revive her doll instead. They decide to gather the ingredients again and try again. Patrick fails to find snakeskin for the ritual. He decides to circumcise himself and use that in place of the snakeskin. It works. Keefer comes back to life and Blossom and Keefer have sex. Queen Tulip then reveals that she has always had a spare key for the chastity belt and it never really mattered anyway. Holden reveals to Patrick that the circumcision inspection was a prank done out of revenge.
7	7	"Look Who's Stalking"	John Harvatine IV	Sean Lavery	June 12, 2020
When his subjects are at his throat for wasting the kingdom's funds, Merriman seeks to escape his royal life by venturing up a beanstalk he accidentally planted, forcing Patrick to accompany him and bring him back.
8	8	"The Snow Job"	John Harvatine IV	Maggie Monahan	June 12, 2020
When the kingdom gets overridden with cold temperatures, Patrick brings the royals to a hidden lodge his parents go to, but he gets left behind and contends with a hoarding yeti named Norah. At the lodge, Merriman's leadership is tested when the practical Glenn gains more popularity then him.
9	9	"The A-Moooo-Zing Race"	John Harvatine IV	Amy Reed	June 12, 2020
The assassin strikes back by kidnapping Blososm and holding her in a maze that Patrick and countless others brave through to rescue the princess, who ends up getting the best of the maze's Minotaur guardian.
10	10	"Unchained Monarchy"	John Harvatine IV	Tom Root	June 12, 2020
The assassin, revealed to be Patrick’s girlfriend Sloane, has imprisoned the royal family with the intent on making her mother and Merriman's sister, Donna, the new queen and has an amassed army ready, forcing Patrick to beg his criminal siblings and others to fight for the kingdom.

=== Season 2 (2021) ===
No. overall	No. in season	Title	Directed by	Written by	Original release date
11	1	"Shamrock Shakedown"	John Harvatine IV; Bradley Schaffer	Shawn Kenji Pearlman	December 10, 2021
Patrick finds himself on trial for betraying the kingdom, and only avoids punishment with a hopeful promise to the king: that he will find the legendary leprechaun gold.
12	2	"Toxic Femininity"	John Harvatine IV; Bradley Schaffer	Marina Shifrin	December 10, 2021
A drug epidemic at Blossom's all-girls academy threatens to derail the king and queen's scheme to draw attention to their newfound wealth.
13	3	"Destination: Wedding"	John Harvatine IV; Bradley Schaffer	Michael Poisson	December 10, 2021
The wedding of the year brings Merriman a chance to mend fences with King Rami IV.
14	4	"Good Vibrations"	John Harvatine IV; Bradley Schaffer	Brandy Finmark	December 10, 2021
When Queen Tulip slips into a sex-toy-induced coma, King Merriman throws a beauty pageant with hopes of replacing her; Patrick attempts to wake the queen before the kingdom is torn apart.
15	5	"Get Your Minchachas Out"	John Harvatine IV; Bradley Schaffer	Tom Root	December 10, 2021
On an island training retreat, Patrick and the squires meet the most famous knight in the kingdom, but Patrick quickly decides the knight's lessons are superficial crap.
16	6	"Tent Pitching"	John Harvatine IV; Bradley Schaffer	Marina Shifrin	December 10, 2021
The circus returns to the kingdom; Blarney reunites with his uppity clown-college roommates.
17	7	"Nothin, Usurp With U"	John Harvatine IV; Bradley Schaffer	Amanda Barnes	December 10, 2021
The kingdom adjusts to life under the Old King, who is back on the throne thanks to Danielle's machinations; Patrick is torn between his loyalty to the kingdom and loyalty to his former king; Merriman finds a new career after a drug trip.
18	8	"Sad-iator"	John Harvatine IV; Bradley Schaffer	Shawn Kenji Pearlman	December 10, 2021
As punishment for his refusal to turn in King Merriman, Patrick is forced to fight in the arena as a gladiator.
19	9	"Knight Of The F**king Dead"	John Harvatine IV; Bradley Schaffer	Brandy Finmark	December 10, 2021
Patrick is tasked with chaperoning Princess Blossom, but he abandons his duties to hang out with knights at a party; Princess Blossom switches bodies with her deceased Aunt Donna, who runs amok at the party.
20	10	"Hard Day's Knight"	John Harvatine IV; Bradley Schaffer	Maggie Monahan	December 10, 2021
The Mole People finally lash out at the surface-dwellers who have ruined their home by depleting their jewel mines.

== Production ==
=== Development ===
On September 27, 2018, it was announced that Hulu had given the production a series order for a first season consisting of ten episodes. The series was created by John Harvatine IV and Tom Root who were also expected to serve as executive producers. The series was produced by Stoopid Buddy Stoodios and distributed by Sony Pictures Television. On June 18, 2020, Hulu renewed the series for a second season. On June 9, 2022, co-creator John Harvatine IV revealed the show was cancelled.

=== Casting ===
Alongside the series order announcement, it was confirmed that the series' voice cast would consist of Nicholas Hoult and Luke Evans, among others.

== Reception ==
On Rotten Tomatoes, the first season holds a 27% approval rating based on reviews from 15 critics. A top Rotten Tomatoes critic wrote, "What sets it apart is the adorable wooden character and set design, the quaintness of which is mercilessly defiled by filthy dialogue and visuals." Metacritic, which uses a weighted average, gives it a score of 47 out of 100, indicating "mixed or average reviews".
