= Hot Cross Buns (film) =

- A pentagram created by recorders
- Directed by: Brian Wysol
- Distributed by: Channel 101; YouTube
- Release dates: October 29, 2011 (Channel 101); October 30, 2011 (YouTube)
- Running time: 4:32
- Country: United States

Hot Cross Buns is a Channel 101 and YouTube Internet video published on October 29, 2011.

== Plot ==
A school teacher begins a musical lesson to a classroom of children with recorders. One child asks if it is "Three Blind Mice" while the teacher says "Hot Cross Buns". As they play, the children's eyes glow and "x"'s appear on their forehead. Ten years later, he sits on a couch with his wife Kim, a Korean policewoman. He remarks his marriage has put "Hot Cross Buns" behind him which confuses Kim. A melody starts from another room and he asks about it. Kim says she found a box of recorders in the attic and their daughter Christine is practicing "Three Blind Mice". He says it is not "Three Blind Mice" but "Hot Cross Buns". Both parents go to Christine's bedroom to find she is playing the song. He tries to dissuade her from playing "Hot Cross Buns" with "Three Blind Mice". However, Christine continues with the same song and her eyes glow and a "x" appears on her forehead. He explains it is a mark for an otherworldly monster "Hot Cross Buns" who will claim their daughter as its own. He explains that this was his life when Kim says this is illegal. Despite this, he pulls out a recorder and plays the song causing him to disappear into another reality. In front of a castle, he asks the guard to see the three blind mice inside. The guard declines his request yet he persists. As things ensue, he recalls Kim's plea to abstain from illegalism. Regardless, he chokes the guard. After, he confronts the three blind mice who implore him to confront the beast with a pure heart. Instead, he requests magic from them. The mice reply magic of a pure heart is all that is needed when he sees their magic sceptre. Distracting the blind mice, he then steals it which cause them to die. Atop the castle, he uses the sceptre to summon the beast. Hot Cross Buns says the magic sceptre cannot kill him due to the ways of the three blind mice. The beast also invades his mind. The memory of Kim arrests him for illegal mind invasion. Distracting Hot Cross Buns, he then kills the beast. Returning to his home, he finds his daughter dead and Kim explains the circumstance. In a flashback, Hot Cross Buns says his life was linked with Christine. Nevertheless, he proceeds to sing the song one last time.

== Cast ==
- Scott Chernoff
- Dawn Cody
- Jason Makiaris
- Brenan Campbell
- Brian Wysolmierski

== Background and release ==
In 2011, writer Brian Wysol created a series of shorts for Dan Harmon and Rob Schrab's Channel 101 including Hot Cross Buns and We Solve the Crime. Wysol said Hot Streets was a synthesis of the two: "One was a supernatural horror cartoon and the other was a cop show, and they were my favorites [...] I wanted to weave their sensibilities together, so I came up with the idea for this new FBI supernatural investigative show." In 2012, Wysol decided to combine the shorts for the Hot Streets pilot.

Hot Cross Buns was originally uploaded to Channel 101 on October 29, 2011. It was uploaded to YouTube the next day.

== Reception ==
Reviewing Hot Streets, Bubbleblabber's John Schwarz received the short favorably with "Fans of Brian's work on Channel 101 will be happy to hear that there are full episodes that pay homage to a few of his shorts like "Hot Cross Buns"."
