= We Solve the Crime =

- Both Lt. David French (left) and Lt. Mark Branski (right) are driving their car.
- Directed by: Brian Wysol
- Distributed by: Channel 101; YouTube
- Release dates: July 30, 2011 (Channel 101); July 31, 2011 (YouTube)
- Running time: 3:30

We Solve the Crime is a Channel 101 and YouTube Internet video published on July 30, 2011.

== Background ==
In 2011, writer Brian Wysol created a series of shorts for Dan Harmon and Rob Schrab's Channel 101 including Hot Cross Buns and We Solve the Crime. Wysol said Hot Streets was a synthesis of the two: "One was a supernatural horror cartoon and the other was a cop show, and they were my favorites [...] I wanted to weave their sensibilities together, so I came up with the idea for this new FBI supernatural investigative show." In 2012, Wysol decided to combine the shorts for the Hot Streets pilot.

== Broadcast ==
We Solve the Crime was originally uploaded to Channel 101 on July 30, 2011. Later, it was uploaded to YouTube on July 31, 2011.

== Characters ==
- Lt. Mark Branski (voiced by Brian/Mike McCafferty)
- Lt. David French (voiced by Brian Wysol)
- Mike Rose

== Plot ==
A talk begins between school teacher Mr. Storms and his student Timothy Vasquez. Timothy asks why Mr. Storms wanted him, and Mr. Storms says he wanted to stab Timothy in the head with a knife and does so. After, Mr. Storms says no one will solve this crime. Meanwhile, the narrator introduces the protagonists Lieutenants Mark Branski who wields an oversized gun and David French whose hand is a lie-detector. On their way to Mr. Storms' residence, Branski knocks at the door. Answering the door, Mr. Storms learns Branski wants to question him for Timothy's death. Mr. Storms recognizes the team by what they wield. In Mr. Storm's living room, the teacher offers the two health cookies. Despite the offer, Branski asks if Mr. Storms is married. In response, Storms says he is unmarried while Branski and French are not. Afterwards, Branski asks if Storms killed Timothy which he refutes. The three enter an interlude about honesty wherein Mr. French's head levitates into space with ambient music. Returning to his body, Mr. French realizes his wife has been dead for five years. Despite the epiphany, Mr. Storms asks if he remains a murder suspect which Branski declares they saw him commit the crime. In a black-and-white flashback, both Branski and French were in the classroom when it took place. In French's flashback, Timothy is replaced by Lt. French who removes his hat to show the knife in his head. From this revelation, Mr. Storms runs away from the two while both Branski and French chase after. Branski shoots repeatedly at Mr. Storms despite missing each time. However, one shot enters the back of Mr. Storms' head and exits the left eye socket. Crumpled to the street, Mr. Storms dies quietly while Branski remarks they solved the crime. Yet, Lt. French is tormented by his own thoughts. Driving back to her grave, Lt. French recalls black-and-white memories of his dead wife. Paying respects to her tombstone, Lt. French notices that his wife is buried alongside Lt. Branski's. Immediately, French calls Branski via cellphone and the two meet on a rooftop. Branski remarks his wife alive, while French's robotic hand admits this is a lie. Upon this truth, Branski brings forth his gun and aims it at his head. French says the world is terrible, and Branski drops the gun in agreement. The two drive back as the scene ends.

== Reception ==
In reviewing Hot Streets, Bubbleblabber's John Schwarz remarked "the early roots [...] can be traced back to the Channel 101 days when [Wysol] produced shorts like "We Solve the Crime"."
