= Eric Towner =

American film director

Eric Towner is an American producer, writer, director and animator best known for his work on Adult Swim's Robot Chicken and Netflix's Buddy Thunderstruck.

== Career ==
In 2005, Towner founded a studio named Stoopid Monkey with Seth Green, John Harvatine IV and Matthew Senreich. He started a show called Robot Chicken and became an executive producer for it. He soon started working on more shows like Micro Mayhem, WWE Slam City, Camp WWE and Buddy Thunderstruck. As of 2011, It was renamed Stoopid Buddy Stoodios.

Towner and Harvatine are going to direct a stop-motion/live-action hybrid named Superbago. He started 2 Robot Chicken couch gags on The Simpsons with Seth Green, John Harvatine IV, Matthew Senreich and Tom Root. His first interactive creation was Buddy Thunderstruck: The Maybe Pile.

== Work ==
- Bratz
- Buddy Thunderstruck
- Lego Scooby-Doo
- Hot Streets
- Blark and Son
- Camp WWE
- Changeland
- The Grand Slams
- Toasty Tales
- Robot Chicken
- SuperMansion
- Friendship All-Stars
- Monster Island
- Sunday Paper p. 2B
- The Madden 16
- The Simpsons
- M.O.D.O.K
