= MrBeast Lab (web series) =

American animated web series

- Genre: Science fiction; Action
- Created by: Jimmy Donaldson
- Showrunners: Matthew Senreich; Sam Levine
- Written by: Mark Palmer; Henry Gilroy
- Directed by: Mike Roberts
- Voices of: Alejandro Saab; Julie Nathanson; Cory Yee; Vanessa Marshall
- Composer: Loke Chung Yow
- Country of origin: United States
- Original language: English
- No. of seasons: 1
- No. of episodes: 10

Production
- Executive producers: Jimmy Donaldson; Michael Cruz; Jeff Housenbold; Paul Solomon; Stephen Davis; Andrew Davies; Mike Roberts
- Producers: William Davis; Bek Fairweather; Jenni Townsend
- Editor: Cameron McCulloch
- Running time: 2–5 minutes
- Production company: Stoopid Buddy Stoodios

Original release
- Network: YouTube
- Release: October 25, 2025 – present

MrBeast Lab is an American animated web series created by Jimmy Donaldson and produced by Stoopid Buddy Studios.
