= Stoopid Buddy Stoodios =

American animation studio

Stoopid Buddy Stoodios, LLC
- Formerly: Stoopid Monkey (1999–2013)
- Type: Private
- Industry: Animated series Web series Movies; Commercials
- Founded: 1999; 27 years ago
- Founder: Seth Green; Matthew Senreich; John Harvatine IV; Eric Towner
- Headquarters: Burbank, California, U.S.
- Key people: Seth Green; Matthew Senreich (Leaders); John Harvatine IV (Chairman); Eric Towner (Deck of the Member)
- Products: Various
- Subsidiaries: Stoopid Monkey; Buddy Systems Studios
- Website: www.leagueofbuddies.com

Stoopid Buddy Stoodios, LLC (formerly known as Stoopid Monkey and stylized as Stoop!d Monkey) is an American production company and animation studio, formed by Seth Green, Matthew Senreich, John Harvatine IV, and Eric Towner. It was established in 2011 following the partnership of Stoopid Monkey, which had been founded in 1999, and Buddy Systems Studios. It is one of the producers of the Adult Swim animated television series Robot Chicken and Titan Maximum as well as SuperMansion on the streaming service Crackle and Buddy Thunderstruck on Netflix.

== Filmography ==
=== Television series ===
Show	Network	Creator(s) / Developer(s)	Year(s)	Co-production(s)	Notes
Robot Chicken	Adult Swim	Seth Green; Matthew Senreich	2005–present	ShadowMachine (seasons 1–5); Sony Pictures Digital (seasons 1–5); Sony Pictures Television (seasons 6–10) (Note: Post-2025 specials only, after SPT pulled out of co-producing the show's eleventh season onwards.); Williams Street	Produced under Stoopid Monkey until 2012, after which the brand is still shown with Stoopid Buddy Stoodios
Titan Maximum	Adult Swim	Matthew Senreich; Tom Root	2009	Tom Is Awesome; ShadowMachine; Williams Street	Produced under Stoopid Monkey
SuperMansion	Crackle	Matthew Senreich; Zeb Wells	2015–19	Moon Shot Entertainment	Stoopid Monkey brand used with Stoopid Buddy Stoodios
Hot Streets	Adult Swim	Brian Wysol	2016–19	Justin Roiland's Solo Vanity Card Productions! Williams Street	First traditional animated series from Stoopid Buddy Stoodios
Buddy Thunderstruck	Netflix	Ryan Wiesbrock	2017	American Greetings Entertainment	First family-oriented production from Stoopid Buddy Stoodios
Crossing Swords	Hulu	John Harvatine IV; Tom Root	2020–21	Tom Is Awesome; Sony Pictures Television	Buddy System Studios brand used with Stoopid Buddy Stoodios
The Summoner	Syfy	Charlie Hankin	2021		
M.O.D.O.K.	Hulu	Jordan Blum; Patton Oswalt	2021	10k Multiverse Cowboy; Marvel Television	
Ultra City Smiths	AMC	Steve Conrad	2021	Elephant Pictures; AMC Studios	
Santa Inc.	HBO Max	Alexandra Rushfield	2021	Rushfield Productions oh us. Point Grey Pictures; Lionsgate Television	
Duffy & Friends	Disney+	TBA	TBA	Disney Parks, Experiences and Products	
Rhona Who Lives by the River	Disney+	Emily Kapnek	TBA	Piece of Pie Productions; 20th Television Animation; Disney Television Animation	
Micro Mayhem	The Roku Channel	John Harvatine IV	TBA	Golem Creations; Entertainment One	
Filthy Animals	The Roku Channel	Nikolai Haas; Simon Haas; Carrey O'Donnell; Johnny Smith	TBA	Le Train Train	
Superbago!	TBA	TBA	TBA	Sony Pictures Animation	Originally developed as a feature film.

=== Web series ===
Network	Show	Creator(s) / Developer(s)	Year(s)	Co-production(s)	Notes
YouTube	The Stoopid Monkey Show	N/A	2011–14		Produced under Stoopid Monkey until 2012, after which the brand is still shown with Stoopid Buddy Stoodios
YouTube	Dinosaur Office	N/A	2011–12	CollegeHumor	
WWE Network	WWE Slam City	WWE	2014	WWE	
YouTube	The Grand Slams	Denny's	2014–18	Denny's	
YouTube	Kre-O Transformers	N/A	2015	Hasbro	
YouTube	Bratz	N/A	2015	MGA Entertainment	
YouTube	Lego Scooby-Doo	N/A	2015–16	The Lego Group	
WWE Network	Camp WWE	Seth Green	2016–18	Film Roman; WWE	
Instagram; YouTube; Comedy Central	Blark and Son	Ben Bayouth; Adam Aseraf	2018–21		
YouTube	Alabama Jackson	Donald Faison	2022	Adeosun; Williams Street	
YouTube	MrBeast Lab	Jimmy Donaldson	2025	MrBeast	

=== Specials ===
Network	Special	Year	Co-production(s)	Notes
Adult Swim	Robot Chicken: Star Wars	2007	Lucasfilm; ShadowMachine; Sony Pictures Digital; Williams Street	Produced under Stoopid Monkey until 2012, after which the brand is still shown with Stoopid Buddy Stoodios
Adult Swim	Robot Chicken: Star Wars Episode II	2008	Lucasfilm; ShadowMachine; Sony Pictures Digital; Williams Street	Produced under Stoopid Monkey until 2012, after which the brand is still shown with Stoopid Buddy Stoodios
Adult Swim	Robot Chicken: Star Wars Episode III	2010	Lucasfilm; ShadowMachine; Sony Pictures Digital; Williams Street	Produced under Stoopid Monkey until 2012, after which the brand is still shown with Stoopid Buddy Stoodios
Adult Swim	Robot Chicken DC Comics Special	2012	Warner Bros. Animation; DC Entertainment; Sony Pictures Television; Williams Street	Stoopid Monkey brand used with Stoopid Buddy Stoodios
Adult Swim	Robot Chicken DC Comics Special 2: Villains in Paradise	2014	Warner Bros. Animation; DC Entertainment; Sony Pictures Television; Williams Street	Stoopid Monkey brand used with Stoopid Buddy Stoodios
Adult Swim	Robot Chicken DC Comics Special III: Magical Friendship	2015	Warner Bros. Animation; DC Entertainment; Sony Pictures Television; Williams Street	Stoopid Monkey brand used with Stoopid Buddy Stoodios
Netflix	Buddy Thunderstruck: The Maybe Pile	2017	American Greetings Entertainment	Interactive special
Adult Swim	The Robot Chicken Walking Dead Special: Look Who's Walking	2017	Sony Pictures Television; Williams Street	Stoopid Monkey brand used with Stoopid Buddy Stoodios
Adult Swim	The Bleepin' Robot Chicken Archie Comics Special	2021	Sony Pictures Television; Williams Street	Stoopid Monkey brand used with Stoopid Buddy Stoodios
ABC	Mickey Saves Christmas	2022	Disney Television Animation	
Disney Channel	Mickey and Friends: Trick or Treats	2023	Disney Television Animation	
Adult Swim	The Robot Chicken Self-Discovery Special	2025	Sony Pictures Television; Williams Street	
Fox	Untitled holiday special	TBA	Fox Entertainment	

=== Feature films ===
Film	Year(s)	Co-production(s)	Notes
Changeland	2019	Living Films; Karivara Films	First live-action film from Stoopid Buddy Stoodios.

=== Other credits ===
Show / Film	Year(s)	Notes
Mad	2010–13	Animation services for the Spy vs. Spy sketches & other features (seasons 1–4)
Big Top Scooby-Doo!	2012	Main title sequence
The Simpsons	2013–2026	Couch gag for the episodes "The Fabulous Faker Boy", "The Cad and the Hat" and "The Many Saints of Springfield", stop-motion animation for the "Denim" segment of the episode "Treehouse of Horror XXXV", and The Nightmare Before Christmas intro of "Treehouse of Horror XXXVII".
The Venture Bros.	2013	Stop-motion sequences for the episode "Spanakopita!"
The Lego Movie	2014	End title sequence
Gravity Falls	2014	Stop-motion animation for the "Clay Day" segment of the season 2 episode "Little Gift Shop of Horrors"
Crazy Ex-Girlfriend	2014–19	Main title sequence for season 1, animated transitions and "Our Twisted Fate" in season 4
Wander Over Yonder	2015	H.A.T.E.R.V. commercial for the Season 2 episode "The New Toy".
Adam Ruins Everything	2018	Animation for the "Re-Animated History" episodes
The Epic Tales of Captain Underpants	2018	Stop-motion sequences for the episode "The Costly Conundrum of the Calamitous Claylossus" and "The Xtreme Xploits of the Xplosive Xmas"
The Predator Holiday Special	2018	Stop-motion-animated short film
Woke	2020–2022	Puppets and animation services
The Paloni Show! Halloween Special!	2022	Production services for short "Plopsie and Friends"
The Guardians of the Galaxy Holiday Special	2022	Rotoscoping animation
The Muppets Mayhem	2023	Stop-motion sequences for the episode "Track 5: Break on Through"
Doc McStuffins: The Doc & Bella Are In!	2023	
Mickey's Christmas Tales	2023	
Mickey’s Spooky Stories	2024	
Mickey & Minnie's Christmas Carols	2024	
Teen Titans Go!	2024	Stop-motion services for the episode "Four Hundred"
A Very Sonic Christmas	2024	Stop-motion-animated short film to promote Sonic the Hedgehog 3.
Green Bay Packers 2026 Schedule Release Video	2026	Stop-motion-animated short film revealing the National Football League team's 2026 schedule.

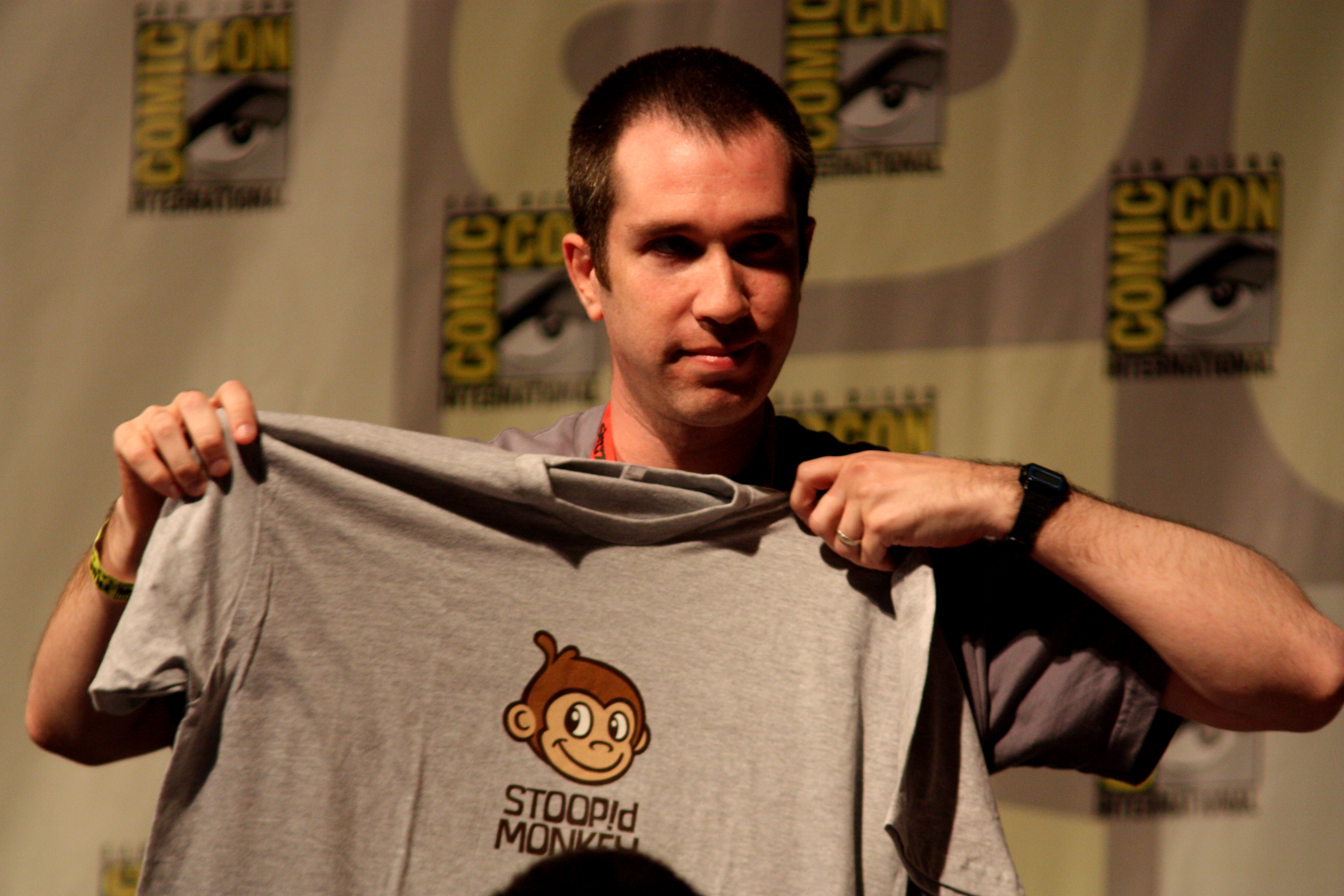
Matthew Senreich with a Stoopid Monkey shirt.

== Production logos ==
Every episode of Robot Chicken from seasons 1–4 displays one of many still Stoopid Monkey production logos following the credits; each depicts a cartoon monkey performing an obviously foolish or life-threatening activity or the aftermath of suicide as an irritated Seth Green is heard saying, "Stupid monkey." Each Stoopid Monkey card was drawn by artist and actor Adam Talbott. All of them except for the first part of "Book of Corrine" have the name with an exclamation point replacing the "I" in a jumbled white font surrounded by a thick black border, as well as a smaller white border around that, and Talbott's signature somewhere on the logo. On Titan Maximum and early episodes of Robot Chicken's fifth season, the logo is the monkey's shining silver head smiling with the shining Stoopid Monkey text below it. On later episodes of Robot Chicken from season 5 onward, the logo returned to a similar concept as the first, but the titular monkey was redesigned to be cuter, despite in season 7 a still variant showcasing only the company logo was used.
