= Hot Cross Bunny =

1948 film by Robert McKimson

- "That was me good deed for the day!"
- Directed by: Robert McKimson
- Story by: Warren Foster
- Starring: Mel Blanc
- Music by: Carl Stalling
- Animation by: Manny Gould; Charles McKimson; Phil DeLara
- Layouts by: Cornett Wood
- Backgrounds by: Richard H. Thomas
- Color process: Technicolor
- Production company: Warner Bros. Cartoons
- Distributed by: Warner Bros. Pictures; The Vitaphone Corporation
- Release date: August 21, 1948
- Running time: 7 minutes 11 seconds
- Country: United States
- Language: English

Hot Cross Bunny is a 1948 Warner Bros. Merrie Melodies theatrical animated short directed by Robert McKimson. The short was released on August 21, 1948, and features Bugs Bunny. The title is a play on the nursery rhyme Hot Cross Buns as well as a punny allusion to the basic plot premise.

== Plot ==
Bugs is "Experimental Rabbit #46" in the Eureka Hospital Experimental Laboratory, Paul Revere Foundation. Bugs lives a pampered life, oblivious to the fact that a scientist plans on switching his brain with that of a chicken.

After giving Bugs an examination, the scientist brings him out to the operating theater, in front of an audience of fellow doctors. Bugs thinks he's been brought out to perform. Upon finishing each act, he looks around to see the unimpressed, stern-faced doctors in exactly the same frame position each time. When he learns the scientist's intentions, Bugs flees and a chase ensues.

Finally, Bugs is rendered helpless with laughing gas and placed on the table, with metallic mind-switching caps placed on him and the rather uninterested-looking chicken. At the last possible moment, Bugs cuts the wire to his electrode, and the scientist and the chicken end up trading personalities, with the scientist clucking like a chicken while the chicken (with the scientist's mind and voice) states in plain English he hopes that the experiment can be reversed. Bugs, still himself, gets in the last word quipping, "Look's like Doc's a victim of 'fowl' play!"

== See also ==
- Bugs Bunny filmography
- Looney Tunes and Merrie Melodies filmography (1940–1949)

Preceded by Haredevil Hare	Bugs Bunny Cartoons; 1948	Succeeded by Hare Splitter
