= List of SuperMansion episodes =

The following is a list of episodes from the series SuperMansion.

== Series overview ==
Season	Episodes	Originally released	
Season	Episodes	First released	Last released
1	13	October 8, 2015	December 17, 2015
2	10	February 16, 2017	April 20, 2017
3	18	May 7, 2018	May 9, 2019
Specials	5	December 8, 2016	April 18, 2019

== Episodes ==
=== Season 1 (2015) ===
No. overall	No. in season	Title	Directed by	Written by	Original release date	Prod. code
1	1	"Groaner's Wild!"	Zeb Wells	Zeb Wells & Matthew Senreich	October 8, 2015	101
After the Washington Monument is damaged during a battle to stop the cat thief Blue Menace, Congress demands the League of Freedom cease operations due to the League's misuse of taxpayer funding on personal expenditures (mostly pleasure). Sgt. Agony, assigned to report on League spending to Congress, is shocked by the league's wasteful expenditures, and his report results in the League's defunding. Black Saturn stops his arch-nemesis Groaner and while in jail, Saturn is shocked to find that Groaner has been ejected from the Injustice Club, as Groaner was his only nemesis to have earned membership, but is even more shocked that Groaner hates the other League of Freedom members more than him, and doesn't consider Saturn an arch-nemesis. Rex scolds Saturn as he has spent the most money, though it turns out Groaner had stolen Saturn's credit card for his own purposes. Saturn is happy that their rivalry played a role in the situation, Finally Brad suggests simply falsifying the records to regain funding, although Sgt. Agony convinces Congress to cut the budget, promising to end the League of Freedom. Notes: Basically an extended version of the Übermansion pilot with all the footage reused along with new filmed footage. Guest starring: Seth Green as Larry and Sen. Burdick, Kevin Shinick as narrator
2	2	"They Shoot Omega Pets, Don't They?"	Zeb Wells	Zeb Wells	October 8, 2015	102
Rex is saddened to learn that his ally Omega Ted died. After learning Ted was murdered, he suspects an enemy from their past: Frau Mantis. Rex and American Ranger go to Omega Ted's H.Q in Antarctica. After realizing he hasn't spoken to Ted in over 40 years, Rex admits he has been a bad friend and Ranger gets angry at Rex as he thinks Rex didn't try enough to find him when he was stuck in the Time Tunnel, instead delegating the effort to Omega Ted. Meanwhile according to Omega Ted's will, the League gets custody of his Omega Pets consisting of Buster Nut the Squirrel, Chet the Bulldog, and Ganky the Pony. At first, the League is overjoyed at the news. However, the relationship takes a turn for the worse as Ganky abuses Brad, Buster Nut controls Cooch, and Chet annoys Jewbot. Black Saturn gets jealous that he doesn't have a super pet so he get his own pet called Murder Pig. Rex and Ranger discover that the Omega Pets killed Ted and inform the League. The pets reveal they want revenge on the League for keeping them in Antarctica because Rex made Omega Ted go there to find American Ranger. The Omega Pets were defeated by the League and the Murder Pig where Ganky was killed by Brad. Guest starring: Clark Duke as Ganky and Omega Ted, Seth Green as Iron Brain and Chet, James Hong as Po, Famke Janssen as Frau Mantis
3	3	"Let's Talk About Rex"	Zeb Wells	Evan Shames & Tom Sheppard	October 8, 2015	103
While waiting for his medicine prescription, Rex flashes back to when he left Subtopia and arrived on the surface of Earth. Rex throws out his back while fighting the intergalactic villain Blazar. A clip of the abortive battle goes viral and leads to speculation that Rex is too old to lead the League. Jewbot tries to help Rex craft a younger image. Rex decides to debut his younger look and attitude on a talk show, but things go south when he insults Blazar and accidentally puts the host in a coma. American Ranger constantly brings up the subject of whether Rex should retire after the incident, but other members keep changing the subject, with Black Saturn particularly obsessed with who ate his burrito but eventually the League decides to have a secret election and place the ballots in a folder. After finding the folder, Rex decides to return to his home of Subtopia and never come back. Blazar finds out Rex insulted him on television and attacks the League. Rex opens the folder and finds out no one wants him to leave, so he comes back and stops Blazar by pretending to surrender but then detonating a bomb he had installed on Blazar's space bike and then beating him up with a pipe. That incident also goes viral and makes people forget about the previous battle. Guest starring: Breckin Meyer as Johnny Scanlon, Ron Perlman as Blazar
4	4	"A Shop in the Dark"	Zeb Wells	Evan Shames & Zeb Wells	October 15, 2015	104
Rex finds out Ranger's sidekick Kid Victory has become Secretary of Defense, so Rex suggests that Ranger invite him to dinner to convince him to raise their budget. Things go horribly wrong as the league is late with the groceries, and American Ranger is appalled to learn Kid Victory is gay and ends their friendship. He starts to send an advertisement for a new sidekick online. American Ranger apologizes and he and Victory renew their friendship. While grocery shopping, Black Saturn finds an old enemy, Bugula. however, Bugula has reformed and gotten custody of his child back on the condition that he constantly wears a leg collar that detects blood alcohol. Saturn tries to apprehend Bugula, putting multiple innocent bystanders in danger in the process by accidentally hitting them with blowgun darts full of tranquilizer. Eventually Bugula decides to prevent further injuries to noncombatants by surrendering. Bugula jabs a tranquilizer dart into his own leg, triggering the leg collar since it turns out Saturn's darts contain 40 percent alcohol by volume. Bugula is arrested and loses custody of his child. Brad's dealer Lucini Mancozo and his partner Tonio shows up at SuperMansion wanting to talk to Brad. Identifying Lucini Mancozo as one of the FBI's most wanted, Kid Victory suspects that the League of Freedom is associated with the Mafia which Titanium Rex stated that the League of Freedom are upstanding law-abiding superheroes. SuperMansion is then raided by the authorities who got a tip that someone on SuperMansion grounds was trolling young boys which American Ranger admits to as the FBI finds the dummy. When Black Saturn, Brad, Cooch, and Jewbot return, they find that dinner was made because Lucini's cousin Angelo makes the best gabagool while Kid Victory has cleared things up with the FBI. As Rex vows not to send the four of them shopping again, Cooch reveals that they are banned from the grocery store. Lucini and Tonio are later taken away by the authorities. Kid Victory agrees to improve the budget, but reveals to Rex secretly that the deal is contingent on Rex ending his affair with American Ranger's wife Gloria. Guest starring: Seth Green as Adolf Hitler, Jordan Peele as Bugula, Scott Thompson as Kid Victory
5	5	"Puss in Books"	Zeb Wells	Heidi Gardner, Kiel Kennedy, & Eliot Schwartz	October 22, 2015	105
A School PSA reveals Cooch is illiterate and Sgt. Agony tells the League of Freedom she needs at least a high school diploma or higher to stay in the League of Freedom. The League of Freedom helps her prepare for her GED test, but Cooch has trouble studying. Jewbot discovers Cooch has ADD and suggests Adderall, so she obtains some from Brad and is doing well until the day of the test when Jewbot gets rid of the drugs thinking they are birth control pills, she panics and moves back to her owner. When helping Cooch with history, American Ranger is shocked to find out what happened to America the years during his freezing and goes to Detroit where he is saddened to learn that the America he knew is gone. He gets introduced to marijuana by a man named Reggie and becomes addicted. Through him, American Ranger meets a Native American named Hawkfeather and inadvertently summons a beast who attacks him, driving him back to SuperMansion. Cooch comes back and takes the test which she passes. Since she didn't sign the test, Sgt. Agony uses this reason to remove Cooch from the League of Freedom. Just then, the beast attacks the mansion and Cooch saves the day. Hawkfeather reveals himself as a professor at New Mexico State University and awards Cooch an honorary degree, allowing her to stay in the League of Freedom. Guest starring: Jillian Bell, Breckin Meyer as Reggie, Wes Studi as Hawkfeather
6	6	"Lex"	Zeb Wells	Tom Sheppard	October 29, 2015	106
Lex Lightning comes to the mansion and reveals herself as Rex's daughter. Rex tries to bond with her but panics and abandons her at a mountain. Sgt. Agony tries to use this as an excuse to shut down the League of Freedom because Rex is a bad father, so Rex pretends to be good to Lex to improve his reputation. Lex discovers Rex's ruse after their battle with Robo-Dino, who only agreed to a fight if Rex sells him the rights to his name. Lex leaves, but is kidnapped by Robo-Dino to get revenge. Rex and Lex fix their relationship and stop him. The male members instantly develop a crush on Lex, and after finding out she likes bands they form a band called Razordick. Despite their lack of talent, they end up signing a contract with Jewbot's rabbi, and they can't get out unless they find a song that their manager likes. They do release a single, but the song is a critical and commercial failure, while the song their manager refused to allow them to record turns out to be a big hit...for the manager and his new group. Guest starring: Seth Green as Rabbi, Chris Pine as Robo-Dino, Matthew Senreich
7	7	"A Midsummer Night's Ream"	Zeb Wells	Erik Weiner	November 5, 2015	107
Because he has no male genitals, Jewbot decides to become a female with help from Cooch and Lex. Jewbot is now Bernice and when they go clubbing the girls get jealous of the attention she attracts. When Cooch reveals that this was exactly the same jealousy she felt when Lex joined the League, the two bond. After being dumped (and poisoned) by Blood Moon, Black Saturn tries to find a new girlfriend fails miserably. Eventually, he gets desperate enough to ask his old foe and long-term League of Freedom prisoner Groaner for help. After several more failed attempts even with Groaner's prompting, he again runs into Blood Moon who is accompanied by her new boyfriend Carbonaut, a recent graduate of the Muscle Ream Academy (which forms the "B" story of the episode). The encounter is an utter disaster, and Black Saturn gets so drunk he takes home a "girl" after all..."Bernice." Titanium Rex, Brad, and American Ranger start training at Muscle Ream when they get a coupon, which turns out to be a trap by Johnny Rabdo to defeat the League and become a member of the Injustice Club, but Rabdo is defeated by Black Saturn when Bernice breaks up with him and Black Saturn takes out his anger on Rabdo. Bernice becomes Jewbot again because being a woman is hard and Cooch hates Lex again because she is the new girl once more. Guest starring: Tony Cavalero as Johnny Rabdo, Michelle Trachtenberg as Blood Moon
8	8	"Brad Medicine"	Zeb Wells	Tom Root	November 12, 2015	108
The League of Freedom defeat the plot of Rat-A-Pult and Quiplash. Optocorp stops providing Brad his Super Serum, having found a new recruit named Chad who is taking a new serum that makes him stronger than Brad because of Chad's higher chemical tolerance. Brad, Cooch, Saturn and Groaner break in and steal the remaining serum so Brad gets his strength back. Rex hosts game night, but turns out to be a sore loser, so the League tries to avoid game night and even replaces themselves with holograms. Eventually Rex decides he has had enough and goes to bed. Chad is hired by Optocorp to kill Brad and attacks the League but Brad defeats him by getting Chad to overdose. Optocorp decides to end the serum project, realizing they make more money in energy drinks anyway. Guest starring: Jon Bernthal as Rat-A-Pult, Donald Faison as Quiplash, Matthew Senreich
9	9	"Unfortunate Son"	Zeb Wells	Tom Sheppard	November 19, 2015	109
Black Saturn wants rocket shoes, but his parents stop giving him his allowance. Black Saturn tries to impress his parents by saying Lex and Jewbot are his girlfriend and servant respectively, but his parents will only restart his allowance if he works one day at any of their companies. He turns out to be a horrible employee at CableVerse, but eventually gets his allowance back. Lex becomes sympathetic towards Saturn when Saturn reveals he wants his parents' love and how he hates his younger brother Dudley because his parents love him because, in his words, his parents say his brother wants to become a "real adult." Lex and Saturn start dating. Rex wants to cancel a cable subscription from CableVerse, but when he calls, an employee named Rajish refuses to accept his request. Rex finds the branch office and discovers all the employees pretend to be Rajish. Rex finds Saturn working there. His father Cliff owns the cable company, so Saturn agrees to cancel it to spite his parents. While his parents are still impressed with his relationship with Black Saturn, he secretly photo-cashes the check before ripping it as he was also able to get rocket shoes for Lex. Jewbot spends the day with Dudley. Jewbot sees Dudley as a boy who does not get love from his parents and Saturn. However, Jewbot finds out Dudley has a secret life as a drug dealer. They are kidnapped by Russians who also kidnapped Dudley's nanny, but Jewbot saves them with help from Cooch and Brad. Dudley thanks him for his help, but tells Jewbot not to tell his secret to anyone or else he will destroy him. In the final scene, Dudley gets into the tub with his nanny as he rips the head off the Black Saturn action figure. Guest starring: Seth Green as Cliff Wheelihan, Anton Yelchin as Dudley Wheelihan
10	10	"Babes in the Wood"	Zeb Wells	Mehar Sethi	November 26, 2015	110
The League of Freedom goes on vacation in the woods and Lex tells her father to tell the truth to American Ranger about his affair with Gloria. While fishing, Ranger tells Rex how difficult it is to be married to Gloria now that she is an old woman and that he wants to live his life. Rex tells the truth and Ranger is angry that Rex not only had an affair with his wife but continued even after he was found out, so they end their friendship. Lex wants to have sex with Black Saturn who brought his family butler Bunsen along, but he refuses because he is scared of being caught by Rex and what he may do. Eventually, Saturn agrees to have sex with Lex but they are caught by Rex and Saturn runs away naked. A man named Cleb who was injured by Rex for flirting with Lex gets the League to surrender as he and his friends have shotguns. Rex agrees to embarrass himself to let the League go but Ranger saves the day with some help from Bunsen. While he and Rex are no longer friends, Ranger respects him as a leader. However, he starts to figure out that Rex had sex with his mother. In the post-credits, there is a commercial for "Bunsen: Backwoods Butler." Guest starring: Nick Kroll as Cleb, Matthew Senreich, Dan Stevens as Bunsen
11	11	"The Inconceivable Escape of Dr. Devizo"	Zeb Wells	Evan Shames	December 3, 2015	111
Rex wants the League to be careful of Dr. Devizo who intends to break out of SuperMansion's prison on the anniversary of his incarceration. Dr. Devizo and Rex talk in the cell and Dr. Devizo reveals that he was a member of the League, but became evil after finding out Rex had had an affair with his wife. After realizing Ranger, now in the same situation, could also turn to evil, Rex leaves to find him and Devizo hatches his escape. Ranger, taking a cue from the movie Hall Pass, seeks to have a one night stand to get revenge on his wife for having the affair with Rex. Ranger finds a girl but when they reach her apartment Rex arrives with Gloria. Rex and Gloria apologize and acknowledges that Ranger is trying hard to maintain his marriage to Gloria and she says she understands if he wants to end it, but they reconcile and Gloria agrees to try. Devizo almost escapes because of the other League members' incompetence, but is finally brought to heel by Lex, whom Rex had earlier forbidden to participate. The event garners headlines for Lex. Guest starring: Jon Bernthal as Rat-A-Pult, Donald Faison as Quiplash, Chris Pine as Robo-Dino
12	12	"Lexanity"	Zeb Wells	Erik Weiner	December 10, 2015	112
Billionaire Ivan Whiff starts his own superhero league and offers Lex the chance to be the first full member. Lex, who feels stifled by her father and stuck interning for the League of Freedom, accepts the offer after considerable thought, but finds out that this was a plan by Agony and Whiff to use Lex's popularity to make Team Whiff popular so they won't need the League of Freedom, so Lex stays with her father. Jewbot becomes a doctor for the League of Freedom despite his unpopular bedside manner. In a twist ending, Jewbot reviews Lex's medical analysis and finds insect DNA on her as Lex beheads Jewbot. Guest starring: Nat Faxon as Ivan Whiff
13	13	"Lex as a Weapon"	Zeb Wells	Zeb Wells	December 17, 2015	113
Lex betrays the League where she devolves Cooch, depowers Brad, and traps American Ranger in a time tunnel. She teams up with Dr. Devizo where she releases him and the villains Blue Menace, Groaner, Buster Nut, Chet, Blazar, Bugula, Robo-Dino, Johnny Rabdo, Rat-A-Pult, and Quiplash from SuperMansion's prison. Lex reveals that her mother is Frau Mantis and wants revenge on Rex for letting her mother die in the fall. Much to the shock of Rex and Saturn, Lex has the ability to change gender thanks to inheriting her mother's mantis DNA; Saturn faints in response. Dr. Devizo plans to launch nuclear missiles with the codes that Lex stole from Ivan Whiff and puts the League in their own prison. They escape and fight the villains where Groaner released Black Saturn since it would be difficult for him to find another worthy superhero for him to fight as Chet is accidentally evolved. Titanium Rex blinds Lex, Black Saturn devolves Blazar to a monkey, American Ranger rescue Gloria from Blue Menace, and the League of Freedom stops Dr. Devizo. Brad sacrifices himself to destroy the mainframe by burrowing into the underground lava to save the world, but the mansion is destroyed in the process and the League mourn for him while the villains get away. Even Sgt. Agony mourns him as he admits Brad was the only League of Freedom member he liked. Three months later, the mansion is getting rebuilt and a statue of Brad is dedicated to him. Guest starring: Jon Bernthal as Rat-A-Pult, Tony Cavalero as Johnny Rabdo, Donald Faison as Quiplash, Seth Green as Chet, Famke Janssen as Frau Mantis, Jake Johnson, Ron Perlman as Blazar, Chris Pine as Robo-Dino

=== Season 2 (2017) ===
No. overall	No. in season	Title	Directed by	Written by	Original release date	Prod. code
14	1	"Virtual Reality Bites"	Nick Simotas	Zeb Wells	February 16, 2017	201
The League is still in turmoil after Dr. Devizo destroyed the SuperMansion and released all of the villains into Storm City as the League of Freedom tries to apprehend Groaner and Buster Nut who have been sent out to gather food for their fellow villains. While American Ranger helps Cooch get over the death of Brad, Titanium Rex and Jewbot must stop a mysterious internet cult led by the Third Eye from leaking sensitive League of Freedom information. Meanwhile, Black Saturn looks for a replacement for Groaner which doesn't go well. When Titanium Rex gets onto the Internet with Jewbot's help, he confronts the Third Eye and discovers that it is the virtual reality form of Dr. Devizo who has brought Lex into the virtual reality. The fight is disrupted by Black Saturn and Groaner. While Black Saturn reclaims the data, Dr. Devizo moves on to the next plot. Guest starring: Paul Rust as Freckles
15	2	"School Me Once"	Nick Simotas	Heidi Gardner	February 23, 2017	202
To boost the League of Freedom's dismal approval ratings, Rex seeks the help of TV host Portia Jones at Champston University. As the League of Freedom members descend on the world of academia, each finds their college niche. In the process, they unleash a campus villain. Guest starring: Ryan Gaul as Chester and Mascot Try-Out Judge, Fred Willard as Dean Worthers, Mascot Tryout Judge
16	3	"The League of Cheesedom"	Alex Kamer	Andy Miara	March 2, 2017	203
The League's newest member Portia Jones (aka Zenith), unveils her plan for restoring public opinion of the League: a themed-pizza restaurant and arcade. Titanium Rex and the team try to make the best of the embarrassing new venture and Jewbot has an existential crisis. Guest starring: Brad Gage
17	4	"I Don't Even Have to Use My J.K."	Nick Simotas	Tom Root	March 9, 2017	204
Buying a former pizza restaurant that housed a missile silo underneath which is also next door to an Arby's, Dr. Devizo and Lex Lightning form the Injustice Club with Blue Menace, Groaner, Buster Nut, Chet's evolved form, Blazar's monkey form, Robo-Dino, and Johnny Rabdo as its members. When actor J.K. Simmons expresses interest in playing Titanium Rex in a movie, the League of Freedom invites him to the SuperMansion and Rex is starstruck. Lex and the villains regroup in their lair as Dr. Devizo reveals that J.K. Simmons’ visit to the SuperMansion plays right into his sinister plan to obtain the Anti-Magno Rod. Guest starring: Tony Cavalero as Johnny Rabdo, J.K. Simmons as himself
18	5	"Black to the Future"	Nick Simotas	Dave Massey	March 16, 2017	205
A Black Saturn from the future travels to present-time Storm City to stop an event that will trigger a global apocalypse: Zenith and American Ranger having sex. While the older Black Saturn helps the League of Freedom stop Zenith's goddess mating ritual, present-day Saturn is sent to a hellscape future. Guest starring: Nat Faxon as Ivan Whiff
19	6	"Blazarmageddon"	Nick Simotas	Kiel Kennedy	March 23, 2017	206
The League of Freedom is called upon to stop an enormous alien named Asteros from obliterating Earth when he finds out that Black Saturn devolved his herald Blazar into a monkey as seen in "Lex as a Weapon." With the help of NASA, the League embarks on their mission, but Rex and team prove dangerously ill-suited for the stresses of space travel. Guess starring: Michael Dorn as Asteros, Lyric Lewis, Jim Rash as Male NASA Scientist
20	7	"The Gurman Files"	Nick Simotas	Tom Sheppard	March 30, 2017	207
Black Saturn resigns from the League of Freedom and takes on a solo case that involves the abductions of retired models that used to pose for a famed 1970s photographer named Mel Gurman. While giving Commissioner Gomez the Saturn Signal to call him and enlisting Courtney's sidekick alias of Ringler, Black Saturn tracks down Mel Gurman where he discovers that his next target is Black Saturn's mother Jancy Wheelihan. Meanwhile, Titanium Rex's old secret identity of Mel Gurman comes back to haunt him as Black Saturn is unaware of Titanium Rex's former identity. At the same time, Portia Jones hears from American Ranger on how Gloria refuses to sign the divorce papers and has been showing off her fetishes on Facebook and accompanies him to Flesh Fest 2017 at the time when Zenith is "grounded in the God's Realm." This leads to Portia and Gloria ending up in a "Gimp Off." After Titanium Rex is arrested by Commissioner Gomez upon his Mel Gurman side being exposed, Robobot, Black Saturn, and Cooch discover that Titanium Rex was framed for the kidnapping by the kerchief maker Frank Flava. Upon finding his headquarters beneath the Trudcucker's restaurant, the League of Freedom free the Gurman Girls who beat up Frank Flava. Upon Titanium Rex being cleared of the kidnapping charges, he thanks Black Saturn for doing the job as Black Saturn tells him not to hug him with the hand that was in his mother's mouth. After watching the news that Titanium Rex was cleared of the kidnappings, Dr. Devizo plans to exploit more of Titanium Rex's past by sending some information to Subtopia.
21	8	"We Need to Talk about Liplor"	Nick Simotas	Brandon DePaolo	April 6, 2017	208
After years of searching, Rex's older brother Titanium Dax becomes the second Subtopian ever to breach Earth's surface. He and his Rock Monster slave Liplor are thrilled to find Rex alive, but their reunion is soured when Dax threatens to reveal a secret about Rex's origins. Guest starring: Dax Shepard as Titanium Dax, Robert Salvador, Gary Anthony Williams as Liplor
22	9	"Logs Day Journey Into Night"	Alex Kamer	Elliot Schwartz	April 13, 2017	209
After the revelation of Titanium Dax's claims of Titanium Rex being a Subtopian spy and the League of Freedom being banned from heroic work for three years, Titanium Rex goes into hiding in the distant valley as a lumberjack under the alias of Jack Lumber. During this time, he comes across his boss Ol' Pappy having problems when a logging mogul named Marcus Rector buys up half the valley. Now Titanium Rex must find a way to help Ol' Pappy against Marcus Rector and his sons Elton Rector and Billy Joel Rector. Meanwhile, the other League of Freedom members haven't been seen by Sgt. Agony for months and Robobot during his work as a data entry worker at the Seismology Institute works to find them upon detecting other Subtopian activities. Robobot finds American Ranger drinking his problems away at a karaoke bar, finds that Cooch has moved into the pound upon finding nowhere else to go and is nearly euthanized, finds Courtney working as a hotel valet, finds Black Saturn having moved back in with his parents while playing internet checkers, and calls in Portia to get them motivated. Afterwards, the League of Freedom finds the Injustice Club's hideout and persuades them to help against the upcoming Subtopian invasion. When asked for the Anti-Magno Rod that was stolen from SuperMansion, Lex goes to obtain it only to find that Dr. Devizo had swiped it much to her anger. After Titanium Rex drives away the Rectors following the lumberjack contest, he is confronted by Dr. Devizo who uses the Anti-Magno Rod on him. At the same time, Sgt. Agony is warning the President of another Subtopian beacon when a female Subtopian arrives and frees Titanium Dax in order to start the Subtopian invasion. Guest starring: Dax Shepard as Titanium Dax
23	10	"Titanium Lex"	Nick Simotas	Tom Root	April 20, 2017	210
The Subtopians have conquered Storm City and enslaved its citizens to work in their mine camps. In addition, Titanium Dax wants to have the stars of 2 Broke Girls found and hanged at dawn. Titanium Rex agreed to follow Dr. Devizo back to SuperMansion, despite not trusting him. When Subtopian soldiers attack, Rex and Devizo are saved by Robobot who brings them to the abandoned pizza restaurant where the League of Freedom and the Injustice Club are currently in hiding. Rex is welcomed by everyone except her daughter Lex Lightning, who still resents him. Devizo enters and opens the suitcase with the Anti-Magno Rod and declares himself in charge of the truce. Rex reveals that Subtopian technology is powered by Magno, which becomes Anti-Magno upon being depleted of its energy, becoming lethal to Subtopians. Rex and Devizo come up with a plan to invade the Subtopian controlled military base for the atmospheric dispersal device needed to spread the Anti-Magno's energies. After both sides get the ordered meats from Arby's manager Deandre, Titanium Rex and Lex Lightning fly to the military base. As Black Saturn, Ringler, Cooch, Buster Nut, and Groaner plan a diversion attack on the Anti-Magno storage facility, Robobot, Blue Menace, Johnny Rabdo, Robo-Dino, and Chet's evolved form are the full-frontal assault. American Ranger and Portia are visited by Sgt. Agony who takes control of the operation as he outranks Ranger. Dr. Devizo prepares the adapter for the atmospheric dispersal device which gets a setback when Blazar's monkey form urinates on it. A flashback shows that Frau Mantis had Dr. Devizo raise Lex Lightning. Robobot leads his group into the full-frontal assault. As Devizo has suspended accounts from Uber and Lyft, Deandre gives him a ride to the military base. During Rex and Lex's fight with the Subtopian soldiers, Dax arrives where he is surprised that Lex is the result of Rex mating with a "dirt walker" and declares that she must die. Rex tells Lex to leave so he can fend off Dax, but she returns to save Rex from dying at the hands of Dax. Lex takes a beating from Dax before she uses her titanium hand to defeat him. After Dr. Devizo attaches the adapter to the atmospheric dispersal device, Rex flies it high above Storm City. Dr. Devizo arranges for Rex to "die a hero" by detonating the device when he isn't out of range. As the Subtopians retreat, Lex flies into the cloud and catches Rex. Dr. Devizo then carries Titanium Rex's body, taking credit for thwarting the invasion and saving Titanium Rex's life. As a result, Dr. Devizo is pardoned for all of his crimes. Portia gets back together with Ringler and they take their leave much to the dismay of American Ranger and Sgt. Agony and the disappointment of Black Saturn. As Rex is recuperating, he agrees to testify at Lex's eventual criminal trial and offers her a place in the League. Lex states that Lex Lighting "retired" and is now calling herself Titanium Lex. Sgt. Agony then appears on TV stating how villains are misunderstood people and states that he has hired Dr. Devizo to help him oversee the future conduct of the League of Freedom. Dr. Devizo then states that he is looking forward to working with Titanum Rex again much to Rex's dismay. Guest starring: Dax Shepard as Titanium Dax

=== Season 3 (2018–2019) ===
No. overall	No. in season	Title	Directed by	Written by	Original release date	Prod. code
24	1	"Home Is Where the Shart Is"	Nick Simotas	Zeb Wells	May 7, 2018	301
After helping the League of Freedom save the world, Dr. Devizo and the Injustice Club move into the Mansion as bona fide heroes. The team struggles with their new roommates as Robobot travels across the country in search of the elusive Swine Kampf that was originally created by the Nazis back in World War II.
25	2	"Masters of Lex"	Nick Simotas	Joel Hurwitz	May 14, 2018	302
Lex starts a romance with the rogue vigilante Max Penalizer, so Titanium Rex and Dr. Devizo must work together to break the couple apart as American Ranger comes along for the ride. Meanwhile, the villains work of bedding Cooch as Robobot learns about the little white lies that humans tell. Guest starring: Mikey Day
26	3	"My Cousin Kitty"	Alex Kamer	Kiel Kennedy	May 21, 2018	303
After the League of Freedom and the Injustice Club have apprehended the Abominable Snow Mime, Cooch's former owner Claudette returns with a lawyer named Morland Stevens seeking to get her cat back ever since Cooch was accidentally evolved by Dr. Devizo during an earlier fight with Titaniam Rex. Robobot agrees to represent Titanium Rex in the upcoming trial. Meanwhile, the Groaner tries to discern the true meaning behind Black Saturn's name. Guest starring: Taran Killam, Paul Scheer
27	4	"Iliga of Their Own"	Alex Kamer	Jordan VanDina	May 28, 2018	304
When the Injustice Club move out of the mansion and steal half the furniture, the League takes a trip to Swedish furniture store ILEGA where they receive the unlikely help in refurnishing the SuperMansion from Ivan Whiff. Feeling stung by the Groaner's absence, Black Saturn finds a rebound nemesis in Bugula. At the same time, Ivan Whiff tries to get Robobot onto his superhero team that Rat-A-Pult, Quiplash, and Bugula are a part of. Guest starring: Jon Bernthal as Rat-A-Pult, Donald Faison as Quiplash, Nat Faxon as Ivan Whiff, Jordan Peele as Bugula, Michelle Trachtenberg
28	5	"Brokeback Saturn"	Nick Simotas	Barry Hutchison	June 4, 2018	305
Storm City is overrun by leprechauns, forcing Cooch into full Rambo mode during the League of Freedom's fight with them. As Black Saturn recruits Ringler to help fight the leprechauns, Sgt. Agony has his hands full with Portia. Guest starring: Dan Stevens, Sam Upton
29	6	"The Long Chaun"	Nick Simotas	Tom Root	June 11, 2018	306
To save Zenith from her evil Uncle Ridan, the League of Freedom travel to the Gods' Realm to fight him. As Robobot learns what it means to be a real boy, Titanium Rex must prove himself to be a true hero if he is to wield the Sword of Azimuth. Guest starring: Kimberly Condict, Taran Killam
30	7	"Back in Black to the Future"	Alex Kamer	Joel Hurwitz	October 5, 2018	307
31	8	"Optimo Rex"	Nick Simotas	Jane Becker	October 5, 2018	308
32	9	"Sympathy for Black Saturn"	Nick Simotas	Steve Pilot	October 5, 2018	309
Guest starring: Gary Anthony Williams as Liplor, Werelin
33	10	"Comicarnage"	Alex Kamer	Tom Sheppard & Zeb Wells	October 5, 2018	310
The League of Freedom attend Comic Con where Black Saturn encounters former League of Freedom members. Guest starring: Pun Bandhu as Gun Chucks, Johnny Pogs, Young Man, Ryan Gaul as Blades, Comic Artist, Moderator, David Naughton as himself, Chubby Nerd, Director, Lauren Weedman as Plantessa, Gary Anthony Williams as Liplor, Gorbot, Serious Nerd
34	11	"Jungle All the Way"	Alex Kamer	Kiel Kennedy	October 5, 2018	311
Guest starring: Minnie Driver as Debbie Devizo, Kevin Nealon as Helicopter Pilot, Jay Pharaoh as Flamescar, Johnny Sanchez as Flamescar
35	12	"Debbie Does Devizo"	Jack Hamilton	Zeb Wells	October 5, 2018	312
Guest starring: Jay Pharaoh as Black Ops General, Extraordinaught, Flamescar, Johnny Sanchez as Extraordinaught, Flamescar
36	13	"Run Ranger Run"	Alex Kamer	Zeb Wells	May 9, 2019	313
When a Russian super-soldier frozen in time thaws out publicly challenges American Ranger to a boxing match, Ranger must confront his fears of letting down America. Feeling neglected by The Groaner, Black Saturn hopes to win back his attention.
37	14	"Teacher and The Goof"	Alex Kamer	Zeb Wells	May 9, 2019	314
Coming off the popularity of their boxing commentary, Cooch and Liplor get their big break appearing on a hit children's TV show. Robobot clumsily hide from Titanium Rex a secret project he's been working on with Dr. Devizo. Guest starring: Maria Bamford as Teach, Gary Anthony Williams as Liplor, Kids, Gary Robertson
38	15	"Back To The Island"	Alex Kamer	Jane Becker	May 9, 2019	315
Cooch and Liplor ride the success of their TV show while Saturn and Ranger join the crew. Titanium Rex and Dr. Devizo have unfinished business on an island where Sgt. Agony has identified a mysterious supervillain. Guest starring: Minnie Driver as Debbie Devizo, Johnny Sanchez as Extraordinaught, Police Officer #2, Roger the Jumper, Gary Anthony Williams as Liplor
39	16	"Bug Hunt"	Nick Simotas	Kiel Kennedy	May 9, 2019	316
The insect traits Lex inherited from her mother Frau Mantis begin to take over her body, posing a threat to Storm City. Despite Rex's objections, Sgt. Agony orders both Leagues to bring Lex in dead or alive. Robobot flees the city with a fugitive. Guest starring: Minnie Driver as Debbie Devizo, Gary Anthony Williams as Liplor
40	17	"Saturn's Six"	Nick Simotas	Jordan Vandina	May 9, 2019	317
Fearing that Lex's insectine influences have made the League a threat, Sgt. Agony imprisons the heroes beneath the mansion. The as-yet-uncaptured Black Saturn assembles a team to bust his roommates from their confinement. Lex remains on the run.
41	18	"Bad Lex"	Nick Simotas	Zeb Wells	May 9, 2019	317
Lex's insect half takes over completely, attacking League members and converting them to accomplices. The remaining heroes track Lex to a National Park where she plans to start a conflagration that will destroy the entire planet. Guest starring: Minnie Driver as Debbie Devizo

== Specials ==
No.	Title	Directed by	Written by	Original release date	Prod. code
1	"SuperMansion: War on Christmas"	Nick Simotas	Zeb Wells	December 8, 2016	211
When an interstellar imp named Mr. Skibumpers unleashes a real-life Santa Claus, the League of Freedom must stop Mr. Skibumpers' plans and save Christmas. Guest starring: Seth Green as Cliff Wheelihan and Rabbi, Jim Parsons as Mr. Skibumpers, Dan Stevens as Bunsen, Gary Anthony Williams as Santa Claus, Anton Yelchin as Dudley Wheelihan
2	"SuperMansion: Drag Me to Halloween"	Nick Simotas	Tom Sheppard & Zeb Wells	October 5, 2017	212
Titanium Rex battles his hatred for Halloween while the rest of the gang grapples with seductive ghosts, angry demons, and evil dentists. Guest starring: Lake Bell as Millicent, Phil LaMarr as Hugh Dorvaks
3	"SuperMansion: Summer Vacation Special"	Alex Kamer	Tom Sheppard & Zeb Wells	August 16, 2018	TBA
The League of Freedom goes on vacation where they encounter former president Barack Obama. Guest starring: Jay Pharoah as Barack Obama, Masi Oka as Toko
4	"A Prayer for Mister T: A SuperMansion Thanksgiving Special"	Nick Simotas	Tom Sheppard & Zeb Wells	November 15, 2018	TBA
Guest starring: Sam Upton as Pedestrian Man #1, Newspaper Man, Jennifer Tilly as Marjorie
5	"World War Tree"	Alex Kamer	Tom Sheppard & Zeb Wells	April 18, 2019	TBA
When tree-hugger scientists inadvertently unleash killer sequoia trees, The League of Freedom must save the world from nature itself. While Rex and Lex go inter-dimensional to beg for Mother Earth's help, Cooch goes on the run with fugitive...
