= Tom Krajewski =

American television writer and podcast producer/host

Thomas B. Krajewski is an American television writer and podcast producer/host. He is known for his work on YooHoo & Friends, Buddy Thunderstruck, Hello Kitty Stump Village and Action Dad and then as Tom “Super Volcano” Krajewski on the "Half Hour Happy Hour" podcast with Alison and Alex.

== Career ==
Following graduation from Winchester High School, 1995, he attended Emerson College, receiving a [title of degree] in film, in 1999. He moved to Los Angeles, for an internship on Talk Soup and The Anna Nicole Show. He got a job at Paramount as a producer's assistant followed by a similar position at Nickelodeon. While at Nickelodeon, he began writing scripts for the Catscratch and The Fairly OddParents.

Tom went on to work on Kick Buttowski: Suburban Daredevil (2010), Angelo Rules (2010), YooHoo & Friends (2012), Action Dad (2012), Breadwinners (2014), New Looney Tunes (2016), Buddy Thunderstruck (2017), The Ollie & Moon Show (2017), Space Chickens in Space (2018), and Boy Girl Dog Cat Mouse Cheese (2019).

In June 2020, the new graphic novel Primer was published by DC Comics and cowritten by Tom and Jennifer Muro.

== Screenwriting credits ==
=== Television ===
Note: Series head writer denoted in bold:

- The Anna Nicole Show (2002)
- Chalkzone (2005–2008)
- Catscratch (2005–2007)
- The Replacements (2006)
- Skunk Fu (2007–2008)
- Tak & the Power of Juju (2007–2008)
- The Fairly OddParents (2008–2009)
- Angelo Rules (2010)
- The Penguins of Madagascar (2011)
- Kick Buttowski: Suburban Daredevil (2011)
- YooHoo & Friends (2011)
- Action Dad (2012)
- Breadwinners (2014)
- New Looney Tunes (2016)
- Buddy Thunderstruck (2017)
- The Ollie & Moon Show (2017)
- Space Chickens in Space (2018)
- Boy Girl Dog Cat Mouse Cheese (2019–2022)
- Care Bears: Unlock the Magic (2023 specials)

== BID ==
Since 2015, Tom has been a member of the "Half Hour Happy Hour" podcast, a weekly podcast.
