= Camp WWE =

- Genre: Animated sitcom
- Created by: Seth Green
- Starring: Vince McMahon; Sgt. Slaughter; Ric Flair
- Opening theme: "No Place Like Camp" by CFO$
- Country of origin: United States
- Original language: English
- No. of seasons: 2
- No. of episodes: 10

Production
- Running time: 22 minutes
- Production companies: WWE Studios; Stoopid Buddy Stoodios; Film Roman

Original release
- Network: WWE Network
- Release: May 1, 2016 – June 3, 2018

Camp WWE is an American short-form adult animated comedy series and program created and produced for the WWE Network by Seth Green's Stoopid Buddy Stoodios along with WWE and Film Roman, a Waterman Entertainment company. The show features the WWE roster as kids in a summer camp, with some of the alumni as counselors. This was the final production produced by Film Roman before its closure in 2018.

== Voice cast ==
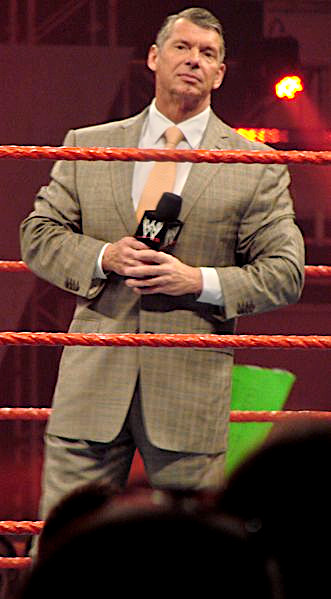
Vince McMahon is the protagonist.

- Vince McMahon as himself, Owner of Camp WWE
- Ric Flair as himself, Head of Laundry and a counselor
- Sgt. Slaughter as himself, Head of Security and a counselor
- Lex Luger as himself, a bus driver
- The Godfather as himself
- Jake Roberts as himself, a mountain man who lives in the wilderness near Camp WWE
- Ashley Bornancin as John Cena and The Rock
- Aly Fainbarg as Stone Cold Steve Austin, Brie Bella, Nikki Bella, Stephanie McMahon, Paige
- David Michael Brown as The Undertaker and Triple H
- Dan Lippert as Big Show
- Frank Lawson as R-Truth
- Evan Michael Lee as Mark Henry
- Brian Thompson as Bray Wyatt, Paul Bearer
- Xander Mobus as Ultimate Warrior

Vince McMahon, Sgt. Slaughter, Ric Flair, Jake "The Snake" Roberts, Lex Luger, and The Godfather are all voiced by their respective real-life counterparts, while Goldust is portrayed as being a mime-like silent character understood by other characters despite not speaking. The rest of the counselors (including Ultimate Warrior, who died in 2014 while the series was in pre-production) are all voiced by regular voice actors, with Triple H providing the voice for his character's father "Quadruple H".

== Production ==
In 2013, WWE announced an animated series produced by WWE Studios and Film Roman.

== Episodes ==
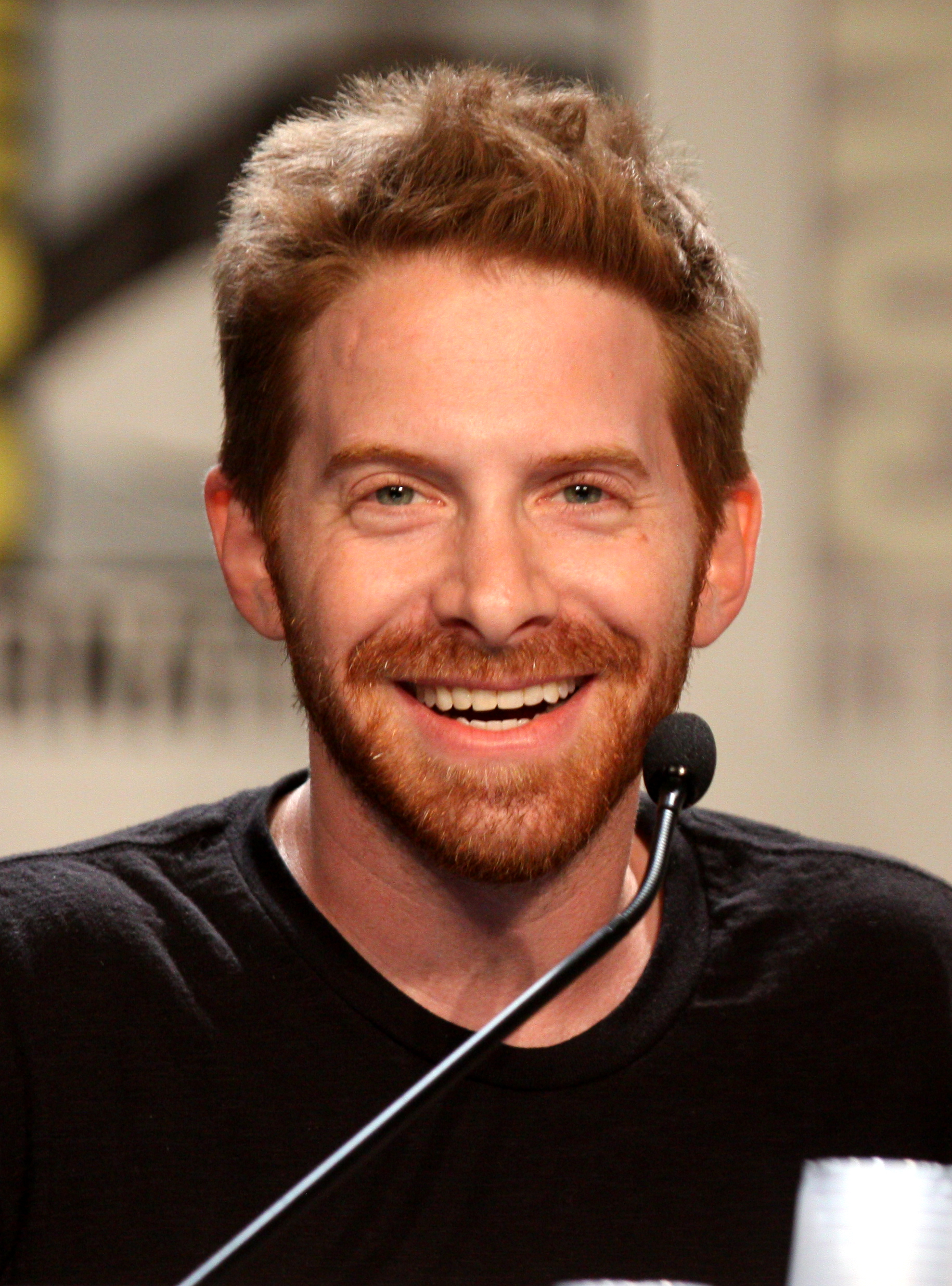
Seth Green played an important role in the animation of the series.

=== Season 1 ===
Five episode titles were announced April 2016:

- Episode 1: "There's No Place Like Camp" debuted May 1, 2016
- Episode 2: "Not Without My Eyebrow" premiered May 9, 2016
- Episode 3: "Survival Weekend" premiered May 16, 2016
- Episode 4: "Vince Is Just Not That Into You" premiered May 22, 2016
- Episode 5: "A Family McMahon" premiered May 26, 2016

=== Season 2 ===
- Episode 1 (6): “A Tale of Two Cenas” premiered May 6, 2018
- Episode 2 (7): “The Ultimate Counselor” premiered May 13, 2018
- Episode 3 (8): "Blackjack Beauty" premiered May 20, 2018
- Episode 4 (9): "The Truth Hurts" premiered May 27, 2018
- Episode 5 (10): "Deep Slaughter" premiered June 3, 2018

== See also ==
- Hulk Hogan's Rock 'n' Wrestling
- WWE Slam City
