= Hot Cross Buns (song) =

Nursery rhyme

Hot Cross Buns was an English street cry, later perpetuated as a nursery rhyme and an aid in musical education. It refers to the spiced English confection known as a hot cross bun, which is associated with the end of Lent and is eaten on Good Friday in various countries. The song has the Roud Folk Song Index number of 13029.

The most common modern version is quoted as

Hot cross buns!
Hot cross buns!
One a penny, two a penny,
Hot cross buns!

If you have no daughters,
Give them to your sons.
One a penny, two a penny,
Hot cross buns!

== Variants ==
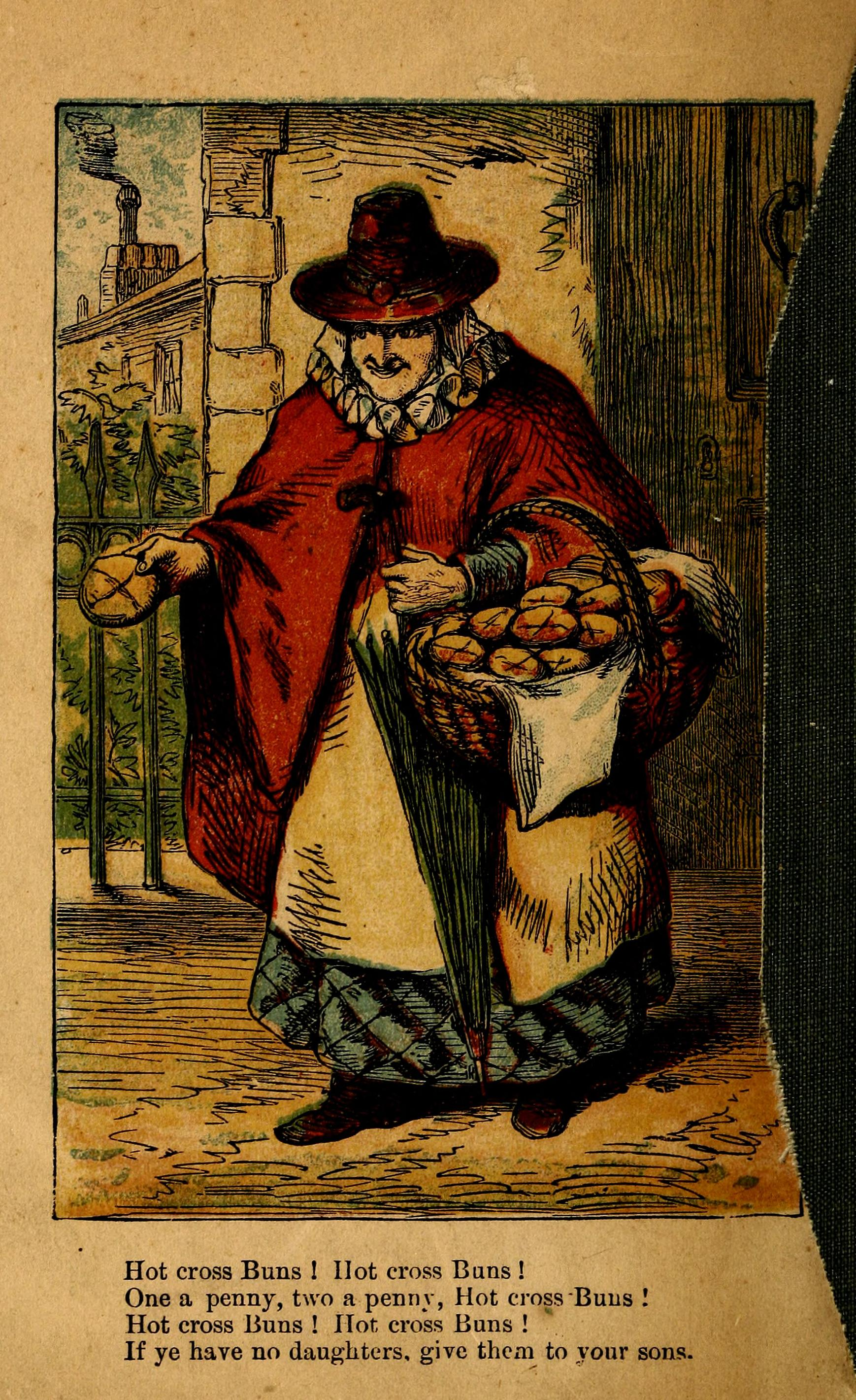
The rhyme as it appears in an 1860s book of Nursery rhymes printed in London

During the 18th century there was no standard version of the rhyme, which was sung on Good Friday to accompany the selling of the buns. The London street cry, for example, is recorded in Poor Robin's Almanack for 1733, which noted:

Good Friday comes this month, the old woman runs,
With one a penny, two a penny, hot cross buns,
Whose virtue is, if you believe what's said,
They'll not grow mouldy like the common bread.

The last line refers to the belief that addition of dough kneaded for the host on Good Friday gave it such powers.

A different version of the cry was collected by Iona and Peter Opie in their compilation of 19th century children's booklets:

'Tis Good Friday morning, the little boy runs,
Along with his sister, to buy hot cross buns;
Her apron is full, yet her brother, the elf,
Unsatisfied still, must buy one for himself.

The words closest to the rhyme that has survived were printed as a round in the London Chronicle for 2–4 June 1767.

One a penny, two a penny, hot cross-buns;
If you've no daughters, give them to your sons;
And if you've no kind of pretty little elves,
Why then good faith, e'en eat them all yourselves.

Two contemporary composers are credited with writing music for this: as a catch by Samuel Webbe, and as a glee by Luffman Atterbury.

James Orchard Halliwell later recorded a similar rhyme in his The Nursery Rhymes of England (London 1846) with the final line changed to "You cannot do better than to eat them yourselves". Yet another street cry was recorded by Halliwell in his dialect dictionary as common in Coventry on Good Friday:

One a penny, two a penny, hot cross buns,
Butter them and sugar them and put them in your muns (i.e. mouths)

A further, different cry was later recorded by Iona Opie:

Hot cross buns, hot cross buns;
One a penny poker,
Two a penny tongs,
Three a penny fire shovel,
Hot cross buns.

After the street cry had made the transition to nursery use, it was also commonly used in music classes and schools for young children trying to master a new instrument, continuing as such to this day.

== Melodies ==
There are several melody variations, two of them widely used:
