= WWE Slam City =

American animated show produced by WWE

- Genre: Comedy; Stop-motion
- Created by: Mathias Triton; Alitha E. Martinez
- Composers: Rebecca Kneubuhl; Gabriel Mann
- Country of origin: United States
- Original language: English
- No. of seasons: 1
- No. of episodes: 26

Production
- Running time: 2 minutes
- Production companies: WWE; Mattel Playground Productions

Original release
- Network: WWE Network; Nicktoons
- Release: March 17 – November 4, 2014

WWE Slam City, or simply Slam City, is an American animated show that was produced by WWE, which aired on the WWE Network and Wednesday evenings on Nicktoons. WWE Slam City was based on the Mattel action figure series starring toyetic versions of the then-current WWE roster.

== Description ==
“The series, filmed in the next generation of stop-motion animation, features a new WWE animated character The Finisher, who fires all of the WWE wrestlers and sends them to Slam City to find day jobs. The wrestlers are plunged into new career challenges as they pack every street corner with work to do and scores to settle. It features John Cena as an auto mechanic, Rey Mysterio as a traffic guard, Alberto Del Rio as a coffee house barista, Mark Henry as a pizza shop mascot, CM Punk as an ice-cream man, Randy Orton as a zookeeper, Kane as a chef and Sheamus as a theater usher. Daniel Bryan, The Miz, Big Show, Brock Lesnar, Santino Marella and Damien Sandow are still jobless but Santino and Sandow are the most desperate to find one. WWE Legends Stone Cold Steve Austin and The Rock are also featured in Slam City. The 'Stretch Move' feature of Slam City characters is highlighted in WWE Slam City.”

== Characters ==
- John Cena
- Rey Mysterio
- Alberto Del Rio
- Mark Henry
- CM Punk
- Randy Orton
- Kane
- Sheamus
- Daniel Bryan
- The Miz
- Big Show
- Brock Lesnar
- Santino Marella
- Damien Sandow
- Stone Cold Steve Austin
- The Rock
- AJ Lee

== Episodes ==
No. overall	No. in season	Title	Original release date
1	1	"Auto-Tude Adjustment"	March 17, 2014
WWE Superstar John Cena takes a job as a mechanic and finds himself in a whole new world after being fired from WWE.
2	2	"Alberto the Barista"	March 17, 2014
Coffee house barista extraordinaire, Alberto Del Rio, finds himself at odds with a very unsatisfied customer in Damien Sandow.
3	3	"A Big Brawl"	March 17, 2014
When WWE superstar Big Show finds himself having some car problems, mechanic John Cena must deal with his new unruly customer.
4	4	"Cafeteria Chaos"	March 17, 2014
Kane is enjoying his post as a chef, so when Santino Marella comes on the scene and attempts to take over, The Big Red Monster steps up to defend his position.
5	5	"The Crossing Guard"	March 30, 2014
Rey Mysterio springs into action when traffic refuses to stop to allow school children to cross the road safely.
6	6	"Surround, Pound and Stadium Beating: Part One"	March 30, 2014
Sheamus uses his power as a theatre usher by confronting a rude moviegoer, resulting in being thrown into the movie.
7	7	"Cold... Stone Cold"	March 28, 2014
When `Stone Cold' Steve Austin drops into the coffee shop, superstar barista Alberto Del Rio attempts to discover the secret behind a Stone Cold Latte.
8	8	"Hot Enough For Ya?"	April 21, 2014
Kane presents a dish of meat loaf to an unappreciative child who wishes that his lunch was hotter, but Kane is happy to meet his demands.
9	9	"Perky the Penguin"	April 21, 2014
Mark Henry goes head-to-head with an evil animatronic penguin to win the soul of the children's birthday pizza haven.
10	10	"Sundae in the Park With Punk"	May 12, 2014
After CM Punk spills something on the Miz's immaculate business suit, the two enter a battle to determine who will foot the dry cleaning bill.
11	11	"Surround, Pound and Stadium Beating: Part Two"	May 12, 2014
As Sheamus and Brock Lesnar continue their battle to determine who is in charge of the movie, they travel into the old west.
12	12	"Battle For The Streets"	May 12, 2014
Damien Sandow and Rey Mysterio face off to determine who is the most suitable to assist children and the elderly to cross the road.
13	13	"The Finisher"	May 12, 2014
The Finisher conspires to send Mr McMahon to prison and steal the WWE Championship, crowning himself as the champion.
14	14	"Between a Rock and a Pizza: Part One"	August 11, 2014
When Mark Henry and The Rock get into a fight over a ridiculously large pizza, an animatronic penguin gets the better of them.
15	15	"Between a Rock and a Pizza: Part Two"	August 11, 2014
Mark Henry and The Rock put their differences aside to hunt down the pizza-stealing animatronic penguin and its army.
16	16	"We All Scream for Ice Cream"	September 8, 2014
CM Punk and Damien Sandow battle to determine which is better: the value of wisdom or ice cream. Punk manages to lure Sandow into a trap with the monster Kane.
17	17	"Coffee Showdown"	September 8, 2014
Alberto is shocked when Miz attempts to use the facilities without buying anything, so he challenges him to a duel.
18	18	"Recipe for Disaster"	September 8, 2014
Daniel Bryan visits Kane's kitchen in search of an old recipe, but Rey Mysterio has designs on a food fight.
19	19	"The Wandering Nomad"	September 22, 2014
Unable to find a job anywhere in Slam City, Santino wanders the streets alone, until a happy accident puts him in the most unlikely employment.
20	20	"Best Dessert in the World"	September 22, 2014
When Mark Henry comes looking for some ice cream, CM Punk decides to provoke him, leading to his prized ice-cream cart receiving damage.
21	21	"Resistant Gorilla"	October 13, 2014
When a stinky gorilla refuses to take a bath at the Slam City Zoo, Randy Orton is forced to do things the Viper way.
22	22	"Who Is the Apex Serpent?"	October 13, 2014
Still on his search for employment, Santino Marella ends up at Slam City Zoo, where he and Randy Orton get into a disagreement.
23	23	"Randy Gets His Goat"	October 13, 2014
When an alarm in Slam City Zoo alerts Randy Orton that a wild goat is on the loose in goat mountain, he jumps into action to wrangle the beast.
24	24	"Surround, Pound and Stadium Beating: Part Three"	October 27, 2014
Sheamus and Brock Lesnar roll through a variety of movie genres before finally winding up back in Slam City, much to the audience's delight.
25	25	"Finale: Part One"	October 27, 2014
As John Cena closes up shop for the night, The Finisher is caught with his hand in the cookie jar stealing the WWE Championship.
26	26	"Finale: Part Two"	November 3, 2014
The Finisher captures John Cena in his dastardly trap, but a surprise entrance from The Rock turns the tables and the two team up to take on The Finisher.
27	27	"Slam City: The Full Collection"	November 6, 2014
The Finisher fires all of the WWE Superstars and sends them to WWE Slam City to find day jobs; John Cena, Randy Orton, Sheamus, The Miz, Rey Mysterio, Kane, and Mark Henry pack every street corner with work to do and scores to settle.

== Comics ==
WWE Slam City Comics are a series of graphic novels based on WWE Slam City webisodes which were released on August 26, 2014, by WWE and published by Papercutz with the creators being Mathias Triton and Alitha E. Martinez.

== See also ==
- Camp WWE
- Hulk Hogan's Rock 'n' Wrestling
