= John Harvatine IV =

American producer and director

- Born: Robbinsdale, Minnesota, U.S.
- Occupation(s): Producer; Director; Stop-motion animator
- Years active: 2000–present

John Harvatine IV is an American producer, director and stop-motion animator best known for his work on the television show Robot Chicken.

In 2010, Harvatine, Eric Towner, Matthew Senreich, and Seth Green launched Stoopid Buddy Stoodios, as part of Stoopid Monkey LLC. Harvatine is represented by The Gotham Group.

In 2016, as of the executive producers for Robot Chicken, Harvatine received an Emmy Award in the category "Outstanding Short-Format Animated Program" for his work on the "Born Again Virgin Christmas Special" episode of Robot Chicken, as well as in 2018 for Robot Chicken in the same category.

Harvatine and Towner are directing Superbago, a mixed stop-motion and live-action film developed with Sony Pictures Animation. Development began in 2014. Stoopid Buddy is also developing Extraordinary Believers as an Xbox Original and WWE Slam City, which was formerly a web series, for Nickelodeon. He has also guest directed for The Simpsons on two Robot Chicken couch gags. Harvatine has created the stop-motion animated comedy, Crossing Swords, for the streaming platform Hulu, which released on June 12, 2020.
