= Fragments (Steven Universe Future) =

- Steven Universe Future episode
- Title Card
- Episode no.: Episode 16
- Directed by: Alonso Ramirez Ramos; Supervising: Kat Morris; Art: Liz Artinian
- Written by: Lamar Abrams; Miki Brewster
- Original air date: March 20, 2020

Guest appearance
- Kimberly Brooks as Jasper

Episode chronology
← Previous "Mr. Universe"	Next → "Homeworld Bound"

"Fragments" is the 16th episode of the American animated limited series Steven Universe Future, which serves as an epilogue to the 2013–19 television series Steven Universe. It originally aired on Cartoon Network on March 20, 2020. It was directed by Kat Morris, Alonso Ramirez Ramos and Liz Artinian and written and storyboarded by Lamar Abrams and Miki Brewster. The episode was nominated for an Emmy Award for Outstanding Short-Form Animation.

In this episode, Steven flees the Gems to be trained by Jasper in an attempt to hone his anger and aggression.

== Plot ==
As the episode begins, Steven (Zach Callison) is being lectured by Pearl (Deedee Magno Hall) after crashing Greg's van at the end of the previous episode as she, Garnet (Estelle), and Amethyst (Michaela Dietz) try to get him to talk to them about his problems. In an ensuing outburst, he accidentally slows down time, during which he takes the opportunity to flee.

He goes to Jasper's (Kimberly Brooks) campsite, where, after a talk, she pushes him to embrace his anger. After hesitation, Steven fights back, and she begins training him rigorously to fight well by honing his anger and aggression.

During training, she makes him climb a mountain while carrying boulders and then try to shatter them, sleep outside, run very fast, and pick up fish directly in a pond. Eventually, Steven glows pink again and grows taller.

After three days of training, Steven challenges Jasper to a rematch. During the fight, Steven becomes much more aggressive, even laughing maniacally. Using his powers, Steven traps her in a barrier and shoots spikes straight at her, shattering her gemstone, effectively killing her.

Distressed, Steven, now back to normal, quickly returns home and goes into the bathroom, ignoring the concerned Crystal Gems. He frantically tries to reassemble Jasper's gem, bathing it in the bottled essences of the Diamonds (the creators of the Gem race) and his own tears. Jasper's gem is successfully repaired, and her body reforms. As soon as she appears, Steven tries to apologize for shattering her; however, to his horror, she responds by kneeling before him and stating, "I bow to your strength, my Diamond."

== Reception ==
=== Viewership ===
The episode was watched by 0.525 million people during its original broadcast.

=== Response ===
The episode was favorably received by critics, who praised Zach Callison’s voice performance and the darkness of Steven's transformation from a happy-go-lucky kid to the scarily powerful being. Shamus Kelly of Den of Geek praised the episode's darkness and Steven's arc leading him to a full breakdown. Jourdain Searles of The A.V. Club gave the episode a score of A.

== Awards and nominations ==
Award	Category	Recipients	Result	Ref.
Primetime Emmy Awards	Outstanding Short Form Animated Program	Jennifer Pelphrey, Brian A. Miller, Rob Sorcher, Tramm Wigzell, Rebecca Sugar, Kat Morris, Alonso Ramirez Ramos, Jackie Buscarino, Lamar Abrams, Miki Brewster, Jack Pendarvis, Kate Tsang, Taneka Stotts, Joe Johnston, Hilary Florido, Nick DeMayo, Maureen Mlynarczyk and Sarah Gencarelli	Nominated	
