= Primetime Emmy Award for Outstanding Short Form Animated Program =

Primetime Emmy Award category for animated short films

Primetime Emmy Award for Short Form Animated Program
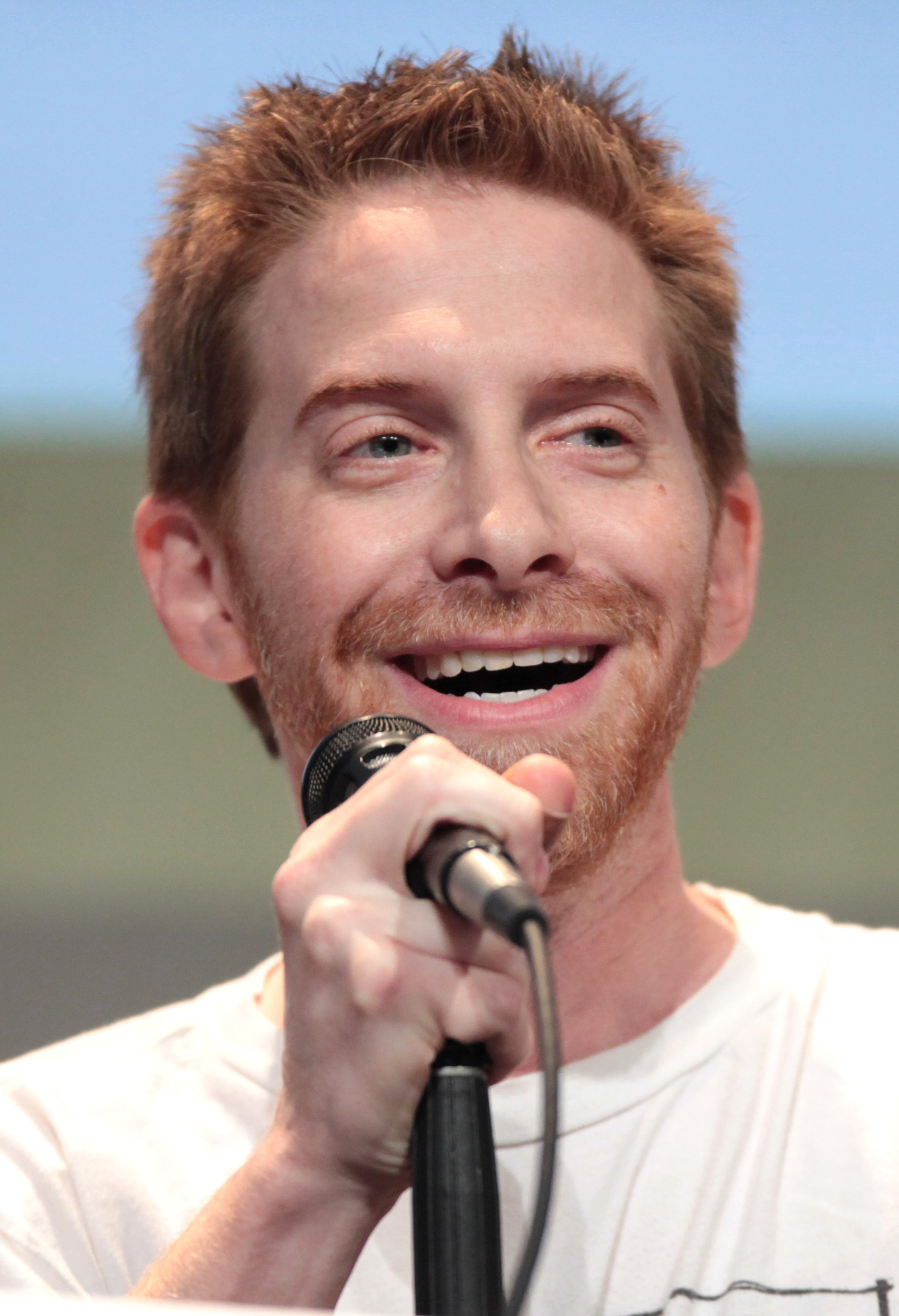
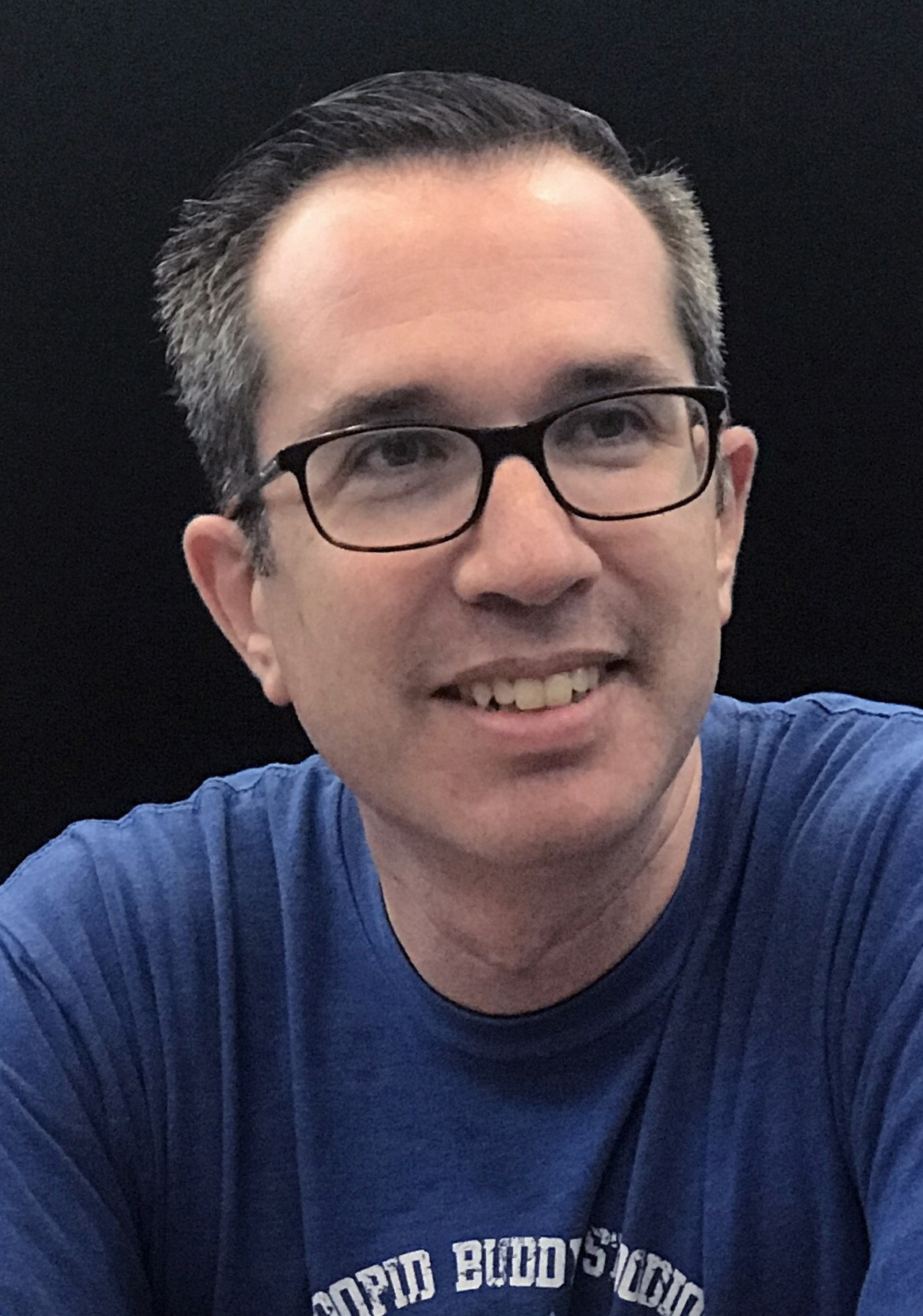
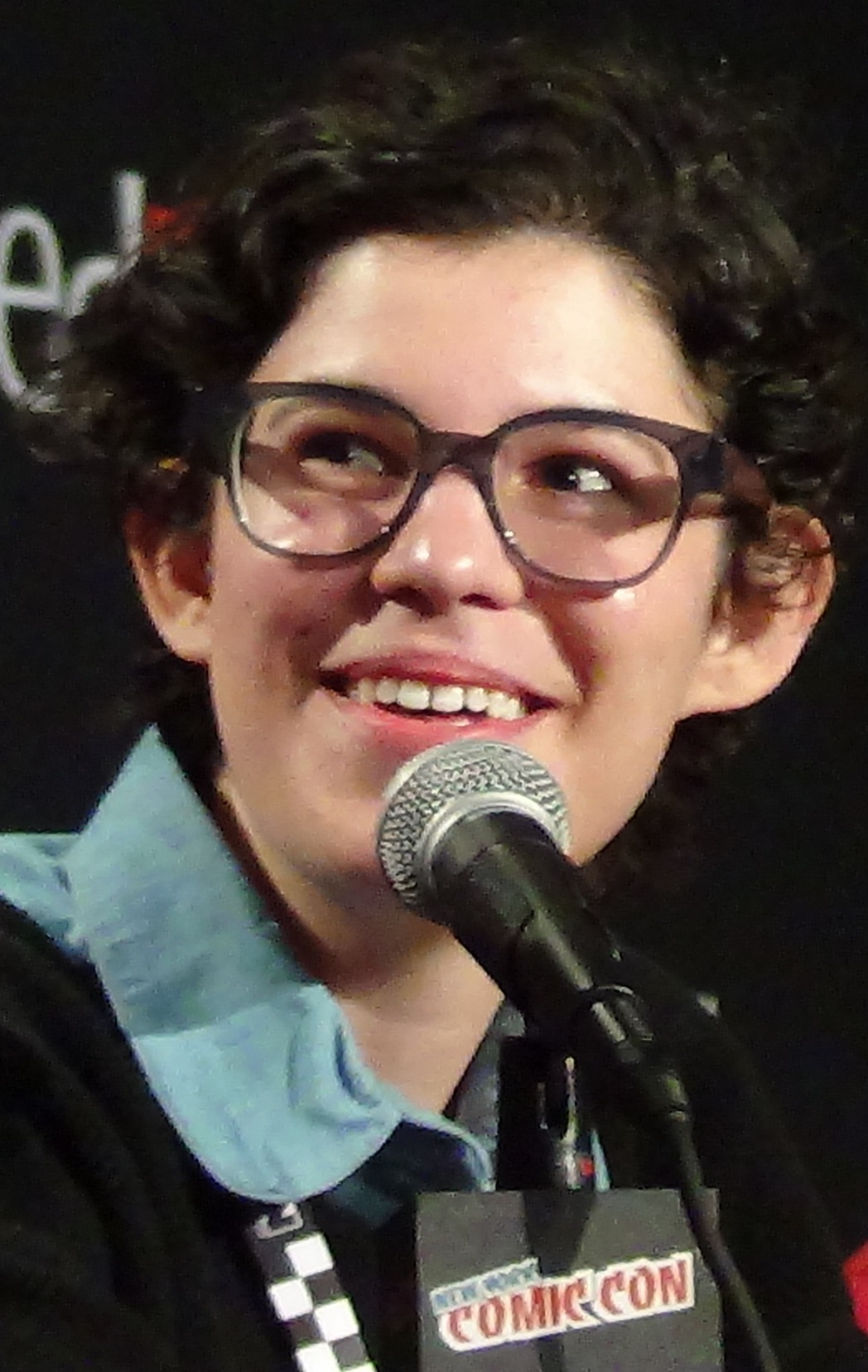
- Seth Green Matthew Senreich Rebecca Sugar Green and Senreich (left and center), creators of Robot Chicken, received the most nominations (12) for their work; Sugar (right), creator of Steven Universe, received the most nominations (8) without a win.
- Awarded for: Outstanding Short Form Animated Program
- Country: United States
- Presented by: Academy of Television Arts & Sciences
- First award: 2008
- Final award: 2022
- Currently held by: Love, Death & Robots (2022)
- Website: emmys.com

The Primetime Emmy Award for Outstanding Short Form Animated Program was a Creative Arts Emmy Award which is given annually beginning in 2008 to an animated series or special of 15 minutes or shorter in length. In 2008 and 2009, the category was called "Outstanding Special Class Short-Format Animated Program", and was an "area" award which could have one, more than one, or no, winners; starting in 2010, the name was changed, and it was made a "category" award which (unless there is a tie) must have one winner. Note that a show whose episodes mainly consist of multiple stories, each 15 minutes or shorter, can either enter one story in this category, or a full episode in the Outstanding Animated Program category.

Beginning in 2024, the category will be consolidated with Outstanding Animated Program.

== Winners and nominations ==
=== 2000s ===
Year	Program	Episode	Nominees	Network
2008 (60th)
2008 (60th)	Camp Lazlo	"Lazlo's First Crush"	Joe Murray and Brian A. Miller, executive producers; Mark O'Hare and Jennifer Pelphrey, supervising producers; Janet Dimon, producer; Brian Sheesley, supervising director/directed by; Won Dong Kun, animation director; John Infantino and Piero Piluso, written by; Merriwether Williams, Kazimieras G. Prapuolenis and Steve Little, story by; Doug Gallery, timer	Cartoon Network
2008 (60th)	Chowder	"Burple Nurples"	C. H. Greenblatt, executive producer/story by; Brian A. Miller, executive producer; Jennifer Pelphrey, supervising producer; Louis Cuck, producer; Juli Hashiguchi, director; William Reiss, story by; Eddy Houchins, supervising director	Cartoon Network
2009 (61st) (Note: As an area award, nominees had to garner 50% approval to win the award. None of the nominees met the benchmark, and no award was given.)
2009 (61st)	Phineas and Ferb	"The Monster of Phineas-n-Ferbenstein"	Dan Povenmire, executive producer; Jeff "Swampy" Marsh, co-executive producer; Jon Colton Barry, written by/story by; Michael Diederich, written by; Martin Olson, story by; Zac Moncrief, director; Robert Hughes, animation director; Herb Moore and Frank Weiss, timing directors	Disney
2009 (61st)	SpongeBob SquarePants	"Dear Vikings"	Stephen Hillenburg, executive producer; Paul Tibbitt, executive producer/supervising producer; Dina Buteyn, animation producer; Aaron Springer, written by/storyboard director; Dani Michaeli, written by; Tom Yasumi, animation director; Alan Smart, supervising director	Nickelodeon

=== 2010s ===
Year	Program	Episode	Nominees	Network
2010 (62nd)
2010 (62nd)	Robot Chicken	"Full-Assed Christmas Special"	Seth Green and Matthew Senreich, executive producers/written by; Keith Crofford and Mike Lazzo, executive producers; Alexander Bulkley, Corey Campodonico and Ollie Green, producers; Tom Root and Douglas Goldstein, head writers; Hugh Davidson, Mike Fasolo, Kevin Shinick and Zeb Wells, written by; Chris McKay, directed by; Ethan Marak, animation director	Adult Swim
2010 (62nd)	Adventure Time	"My Two Favorite People"	Brian A. Miller, Jennifer Pelphrey, Curtis Lelash, Rob Swartz, Rob Sorcher, Derek Drymon and Fred Seibert, executive producers; Kevin Kolde, supervising producer; Kelly Crews, producer; Merriwether Williams and Tim McKeon, story by; Pendleton Ward and Kent Osborne, written by; Larry Leichliter, director/supervising director; Dong Kun Won, overseas director	Cartoon Network
2010 (62nd)	Chowder	"The Toots"	Brian A. Miller, executive producer; C. H. Greenblatt, executive producer/story by; Jennifer Pelphrey, supervising producer; Louis Cuck, producer; Kevin A. Kramer, William Reiss and Ian Wasseluk, story by; Eddy Houchins, directed by/supervising director	Cartoon Network
2010 (62nd)	Kick Buttowski: Suburban Daredevil	"Racing the Schoolbus"	Chris Savino, executive producer/written by/directed by; Sandro Corsaro, supervising producer; Janelle Momary-Neely, producer	Disney
2010 (62nd)	The Marvelous Misadventures of Flapjack	"Tee Hee Tummy Tums"	Brian A. Miller and Thurop Van Orman, executive producers; Jennifer Pelphrey, supervising producer; Pernelle Hayes, producer; Kent Osborne, story by; Patrick McHale and Somvilay Xayaphone, written by; John McIntyre, supervising director; Larry Leichliter, sheet timing	Cartoon Network
2010 (62nd)	Uncle Grandpa	"Pilot"	Brian A. Miller, Jennifer Pelphrey, Rob Sorcher and Craig McCracken, executive producers; Peter Browngardt, executive producer/story by/written by; Rob Renzetti, supervising producer; Janet Dimon, producer; Robert Alvarez, animation director	cartoonnetwork.com
2011 (63rd)
2011 (63rd)	Prep & Landing: Operation Secret Santa		John Lasseter, executive producer; Dorothy McKim, producer; Kevin Deters and Stevie Wermers, written by/directed by	ABC
2011 (63rd)	Adventure Time	"It Came from the Nightosphere"	Brian A. Miller, Jennifer Pelphrey, Curtis Lelash, Rob Swartz, Rob Sorcher and Fred Seibert, executive producers; Thurop Van Orman, supervising producer/story by; Kevin Kolde, supervising producer; Kelly Crews, producer; Pendleton Ward, Patrick McHale, Merriwether Williams and Steve Little, story by; Adam Muto and Rebecca Sugar, written by; Larry Leichliter, supervising director; Dong Kun Won, overseas director	Cartoon Network
2011 (63rd)	Regular Show	"Mordecai and the Rigbys"	Brian A. Miller, Jennifer Pelphrey, Curtis Lelash, Rob Swartz, Rob Sorcher and J. G. Quintel, executive producers; Chris Reccardi, supervising producer; Janet Dimon, producer; Sean Szeles and Shion Takeuchi, written by; Matt Price and Mike Roth, writers; Brian Sheesley and Robert Alvarez, animation directors; Hwang Gi-Ho, overseas director	Cartoon Network
2011 (63rd)	Robot Chicken	"Robot Chicken's DP Christmas Special"	Seth Green and Matthew Senreich, executive producers/written by; Keith Crofford and Mike Lazzo, executive producers; Tom Root and Douglas Goldstein, co-executive producers/head writers; Alexander Bulkley, Corey Campodonico and Ollie Green, producers; Matthew Beans, Mike Fasolo, Brendan Hay, Daniel Libman, Matthew Libman and Zeb Wells, written by; Chris McKay, directed by; Savelen Forrest, animation director	Adult Swim
2011 (63rd)	SpongeBob SquarePants	"That Sinking Feeling"	Stephen Hillenburg, executive producer; Paul Tibbitt, executive producer/supervising producer; Dina Buteyn, producer; Mr. Lawrence, written by; Nate Cash and Luke Brookshier, written by/storyboard director; Andrew Overtoom, animation director; Alan Smart, supervising director	Nickelodeon
2012 (64th)
2012 (64th)	Regular Show	"Eggscellent"	Brian A. Miller, Jennifer Pelphrey, Curtis Lelash and Rob Sorcher, executive producers; J. G. Quintel, executive producer/written by; Mike Roth, supervising producer/writer; Janet Dimon, producer; Matt Price, Jack Thomas and John Infantino, writers; Robert Alvarez, animation director	Cartoon Network
2012 (64th)	Adventure Time	"Too Young"	Brian A. Miller, Jennifer Pelphrey, Curtis Lelash, Rob Sorcher and Fred Seibert, executive producers; Pendleton Ward, executive producer/story by; Kevin Kolde, supervising producer; Kelly Crews, producer; Tom Herpich and Jesse Moynihan, written by; Mark Banker, Patrick McHale and Kent Osborne, story by; Larry Leichliter, director/supervising director; Dong Kun Won, overseas director; Don Judge and Michel Lyman, sheet timers	Cartoon Network
2012 (64th)	MAD	"Kitchen Nightmare Before Christmas / How I Met Your Mummy"	Sam Register, executive producer; Kevin Shinick, producer/written by; Mark Marek, producer; Aaron Blitzstein, Marly Halpern-Graser, Steve Borst and Greg White, written by; Aaron Horvath, director	Cartoon Network
2012 (64th)	Phineas and Ferb	"The Doonkleberry Imperative"	Dan Povenmire and Jeff "Swampy" Marsh, executive producers; Martin Olson, story by; Bernie Petterson and Mike Diederich, written by; Jay Lender, directed by; Sue Perrotto, assistant director; Herb Moore, supervising timing director; Barbara Dourmashkin-Case, Eddy Houchcins, Mitch Rochon and Theresa Wiseman, timing directors	Disney
2012 (64th)	Robot Chicken	"Fight Club Paradise"	Seth Green and Matthew Senreich, executive producers/written by; Keith Crofford and Mike Lazzo, executive producers; Tom Root and Douglas Goldstein, co-executive producers/head writers; Alexander Bulkley, Corey Campodonico and Ollie Green, producers; Jordan Allen-Dutton, Matthew Beans, Mike Fasolo, Zeb Wells and Erik Weiner, written by; Chris McKay, directed by; Savelen Forrest, animation director	Adult Swim
2013 (65th)
2013 (65th)	Mickey Mouse	"Croissant de Triomphe"	Paul Rudish, executive producer/written by/directed by	Disney.com
2013 (65th)	Adventure Time	"Simon & Marcy"	Brian A. Miller, Jennifer Pelphrey, Curtis Lelash, Rob Sorcher and Fred Seibert, executive producers; Pendleton Ward, executive producer/story by; Adam Muto, supervising producer/supervising director; Kevin Kolde, supervising producer; Kelly Crews, producer; Cole Sanchez and Rebecca Sugar, written by; Patrick McHale and Kent Osborne, story by; Don Judge, timing director; Richard Collado and Michel Lyman, sheet timing; Bong Hee Han, overseas director	Cartoon Network
2013 (65th)	Clarence	"Pilot"	Brian A. Miller, Jennifer Pelphrey, Curtis Lelash and Rob Sorcher, executive producers; Peter Browngardt, supervising producer; Nate Funaro, producer; Skyler Page, writer; Robert Alvarez, timing director	cartoonnetwork.com
2013 (65th)	Regular Show	"A Bunch of Full Grown Geese"	J. G. Quintel, executive producer/writer; Brian A. Miller, Jennifer Pelphrey, Curtis Lelash and Rob Sorcher, executive producers; Mike Roth, supervising producer/written by; Ryan Slater, producer; Calvin Wong, Toby Jones, Matt Price and Michele Cavin, writers; John Davis Infantino, writer/supervising director; Robert Alvarez, animation director; Jong-Cheol Baek, overseas director	Cartoon Network
2013 (65th)	Robot Chicken	"Robot Chicken's ATM Christmas Special"	Seth Green and Matthew Senreich, executive producers/written by; Tom Root and Douglas Goldstein, executive producers/head writers; John Harvatine IV, Eric Towner, Keith Crofford and Mike Lazzo, executive producers; Janet Dimon, supervising producer; Ollie Green, producer; Matthew Beans, Mike Fasolo and Mehar Sethi, written by; Zeb Wells, written by/directed by	Adult Swim
2014 (66th)
2014 (66th)	Mickey Mouse	"O Sole Minnie"	Paul Rudish, executive producer/written by/directed by; Derek Dressier, Clay Morrow, Alonso Ramirez Ramos and Aaron Springer, written by; Graham MacDonald, animation director	Disney
2014 (66th)	Adventure Time	"Be More"	Brian A. Miller, Jennifer Pelphrey, Curtis Lelash, Rob Sorcher and Fred Seibert, executive producers; Pendleton Ward, executive producer/story by; Adam Muto, supervising producer/story by; Nick Jennings and Kevin Kolde, supervising producers; Kelly Crews, producer; Tom Herpich and Steve Wolfhard, written by/story by; Patrick McHale and Kent Osborne, story by; Nate Cash, supervising director; Don Judge, timing director; Phil Cummings, Michel Lyman and Helen Roh, sheet timing; Bonghui Han, overseas director	Cartoon Network
2014 (66th)	Phineas and Ferb	"Thanks But No Thanks"	Dan Povenmire and Jeff "Swampy" Marsh, executive producers; Robert F. Hughes, producer; Martin Olson, story by; Antoine Guilbaud and Kazimieras G. Prapuolenis, written by; Sue Perrotto, director; Derek Thompson, assistant director; Barbara Dourmashkin and Terry Lennon, timing directors	Disney
2014 (66th)	Regular Show	"The Last Laserdisc Player"	J. G. Quintel, executive producer/directed by; Brian A. Miller, Jennifer Pelphrey, Curtis Lelash and Rob Sorcher, executive producers; Mike Roth, supervising producer/writer; Ryan Slater, producer; Calvin Wong, Toby Jones, Matt Price and Michele Cavin, writers; John Davis Infantino and Sean Szeles, supervising directors/writers; Robert Alvarez, animation director; Hwang Gi-Ho, overseas director	Cartoon Network
2014 (66th)	Robot Chicken	"Born Again Virgin Christmas Special"	Seth Green and Matthew Senreich, executive producers/written by; Tom Root and Douglas Goldstein, executive producers/head writers; John Harvatine IV, Eric Towner, Keith Crofford and Mike Lazzo, executive producers; Janet Dimon, supervising producer; Ollie Green, producer; Matthew Beans, Hugh Davidson, Mike Fasolo and Breckin Meyer, writers; Zeb Wells, director/writer	Adult Swim
2015 (67th)
2015 (67th)	Adventure Time	"Jake the Brick"	Brian A. Miller, Jennifer Pelphrey, Curtis Lelash, Rob Sorcher and Fred Seibert, executive producers; Pendleton Ward, executive producer/story by; Adam Muto, co-executive producer/story by; Nick Jennings and Kevin Kolde, supervising producers; Kelly Crews, producer; Jack Pendarvis, story by; Kent Osborne, story by/written by/supervising director; Don Judge, timing director; Phil Cummings, Michel Lyman, Jung Yon Kwon, Helen Roh and Barbara Dourmashkin-Case, sheet timing	Cartoon Network
2015 (67th)	Mickey Mouse	"Mumbai Madness"	Paul Rudish, executive producer/written by/directed by; Alonso Ramirez Ramos and Darrick Bachman, written by; Graham MacDonald, animation director	Disney
2015 (67th)	Regular Show	"White Elephant Gift Exchange"	J. G. Quintel, executive producer/writer; Brian A. Miller, Jennifer Pelphrey, Curtis Lelash and Rob Sorcher, executive producers; Mike Roth, supervising producer/writer; Ryan Slater, producer; Benton Connor, Madeline Queripel, Matt Price and Michele Cavin, writers; John Davis Infantino and Sean Szeles, supervising directors/writers; Robert Alvarez, animation director; Hwang Gi-Ho, overseas director	Cartoon Network
2015 (67th)	Robot Chicken	"Chipotle Miserable"	Seth Green and Matthew Senreich, executive producers/written by; Tom Root and Douglas Goldstein, executive producers/head writers; John Harvatine IV, Eric Towner, Keith Crofford and Mike Lazzo, executive producers; Janet Dimon, supervising producer; Ollie Green, producer; Matthew Beans, Mike Fasolo, Rachel Bloom and Brendan Hay, writers; Zeb Wells, written by/directed by; Alex Kamer, animation director	Adult Swim
2015 (67th)	Steven Universe	"Lion 3: Straight To Video"	Rebecca Sugar, executive producer/written by/story by; Rob Sorcher, Curtis Lelash, Brian A. Miller and Jennifer Pelphrey, executive producers; Jackie Buscarino, producer; Joe Johnston, Jeff Liu, Matt Burnett, Ben Levin and Kat Morris, story by; Ian Jones-Quartey, story by/supervising director; Ki-Yong Bae and Sue-Hong Kim, animation directors; Nick DeMayo, animation direction	Cartoon Network
2015 (67th)	Wander Over Yonder	"The Gift 2: The Giftening"	Craig McCracken, executive producer/story by; Francisco Angones and Amy Higgins, story by/written by; Lauren Faust, Ben Joseph and Johanna Stein, story by; Dave Thomas, story by/supervising director; Eddie Trigueros, director	Disney XD
2016 (68th)
2016 (68th)	Robot Chicken	"Robot Chicken Christmas Special: The X-Mas United"	Seth Green and Matthew Senreich, executive producers/written by; Tom Root and Douglas Goldstein, executive producers/head writers; John Harvatine IV, Eric Towner, Keith Crofford and Mike Lazzo, executive producers; Janet Dimon, supervising producer; Ollie Green, producer; Mike Fasolo, Shelby Fero and Joel Hurwitz, writers; Tom Sheppard, written by/directed by; Alex Kamer, animation director	Adult Swim
2016 (68th)	Adventure Time	"The Hall of Egress"	Brian A. Miller, Jennifer Pelphrey, Curtis Lelash, Rob Sorcher, Fred Seibert and Pendleton Ward, executive producers; Adam Muto, executive producer/story by; Kevin Kolde, supervising producer; Kelly Crews, producer; Tom Herpich, story by/written by; Kent Osborne, Jack Pendarvis and Ashly Burch, story by; Andres Salaff, supervising director; Don Judge, timing director; Phil Cummings and Michel Lyman, sheet timing	Cartoon Network
2016 (68th)	The Powerpuff Girls	"Once Upon a Townsville"	Nick Jennings, executive producer/directed by; Rob Sorcher, Brian A. Miller, Jennifer Pelphrey and Curtis Lelash, executive producers; Bob Boyle, co-executive producer/directed by; Pernelle A. Hayes, produced by; Haley Mancini, Kyle Neswald, Benjamin P. Carow and Jake Goldman, written by; Julia 'Fitzy' Fitzmaurice, supervising director; Robert Alvarez and Richard Collado, animation directors	Cartoon Network
2016 (68th)	SpongeBob SquarePants	"Company Picnic"	Stephen Hillenburg and Paul Tibbitt, executive producers; Vincent Waller and Marc Ceccarelli, supervising producers; Jennie Monica, producer; Kyle McCulloch and Jack Pendarvis, written by; Alan Smart, animation director/supervising director; Tom Yasumi, animation director	Nickelodeon
2016 (68th)	Steven Universe	"The Answer"	Rebecca Sugar, executive producer/story by; Rob Sorcher, Curtis Lelash, Brian A. Miller and Jennifer Pelphrey, executive producers; Ian Jones-Quartey, co-executive producer/story by; Jackie Buscarino, producer; Lamar Abrams and Katie Mitroff, written by; Matt Burnett, Ben Levin and Kat Morris, story by; Byung Ki Lee, and Nick DeMayo, animation directors; Joe Johnston, supervising director	Cartoon Network
2017 (69th)
2017 (69th)	Adventure Time	"Islands Part 4: Imaginary Resources"	Pendleton Ward, executive producer/story by/written by; Fred Seibert, Rob Sorcher, Brian A. Miller, Jennifer Pelphrey and Curtis Lelash, executive producers; Adam Muto, executive producer/story by; Kelly Crews, supervising producer; Graham Falk, written by; Kent Osborne, Jack Pendarvis and Ashly Burch, story by; Elizabeth Ito, supervising director; Lindsey Pollard and Cheolhui Han, animation directors; Michel Lyman, Ken Bruce and Maureen Mlynarczyk, timers	Cartoon Network
2017 (69th)	Marvel's Rocket & Groot	"Space Walk"	Cort Lane, Dan Buckley, Joe Quesada, Alan Fine, Andrew Ruhemann and Marc Bodin-Joyeux, executive producers; Stephen Wacker and Stan Lee, co-executive producers; Cara Speller, produced by; Kevin Burke and Chris "Doc" Wyatt, written by; Arnaud Delord, directed by	Disney XD App
2017 (69th)	Mickey Mouse	"Split Decision"	Paul Rudish, executive producer/supervising director/writer; Dave Wasson, writer/director; Darrick Bachman, written by; Graham MacDonald, animation director	Disney
2017 (69th)	Steven Universe	"Mr. Greg"	Rebecca Sugar, executive producer/story by; Rob Sorcher, Curtis Lelash, Brian A. Miller and Jennifer Pelphrey, executive producers; Jackie Buscarino, producer; Jeff Liu, written by; Ben Levin, Matt Burnett, Ian Jones-Quartey and Kat Morris, story by; Joe Johnston, supervising director/written by; Nick DeMayo, Ki-Yong Bae and Jin-Hee Park, animation directors; Kimson Albert, Doug Gallery and Maureen Mlynarczyk, sheet timing	Cartoon Network
2017 (69th)	Teen Titans Go!	"Orangins"	Sam Register, executive producer; Aaron Horvath, producer/written by; Michael Jelenic and Peter Rida Michail, producers; Luke Cormican, directed by; Eric J. Pringle, animation director	Cartoon Network
2018 (70th)
2018 (70th)	Robot Chicken	"Freshly Baked: The Robot Chicken Santa Claus Pot Cookie Freakout Special: Special Edition"	Seth Green and Matthew Senreich, executive producers/written by; Tom Root and Doug Goldstein, executive producers/head writers; John Harvatine IV, Eric Towner, Keith Crofford and Mike Lazzo, executive producers; Margaret M. Dean, supervising producer; Ollie Green, producer; Nick Cron-DeVico, Deirdre Devlin, Mike Fasolo and Tesha Kondrat, written by; Tom Sheppard, written by/directed by; Alex Kamer, Scott DaRos and Matt Sheldon, animation directors	Adult Swim
2018 (70th)	Adventure Time	"Ring of Fire"	Pendleton Ward, Fred Seibert, Adam Muto, Rob Sorcher, Brian A. Miller, Jennifer Pelphrey and Curtis Lelash, executive producers; Kelly Crews, supervising producer; Tom Herpich and Steve Wolfhard, written by; Kent Osborne, Jack Pendarvis, Julia Pott and Ashly Burch, story by; Cole Sanchez, supervising producer; Lindsey Pollard and Dongkun Won, animation director; Maureen Mlynarczyk, Robert Alvarez and Michel Lyman, sheet timers	Cartoon Network
2018 (70th)	Steven Universe	"Jungle Moon"	Rebecca Sugar, executive producer/story by; Rob Sorcher, Brian A. Miller, Jennifer Pelphrey and Curtis Lelash, executive producers; Jackie Buscarino, producer; Jeff Liu and Miki Brewster, written by; Matt Burnett, Ben Levin and Kat Morris, story by; Joe Johnston, supervising director; Nick DeMayo, Ki-Yong Bae and Sue Hong Kim, animation directors; Kimson Albert and Maureen Mlynarczyk, sheet timing	Cartoon Network
2018 (70th)	Teen Titans Go!	"The Self-Indulgent 200th Episode Spectacular!"	Sam Register, executive producer; Aaron Horvath and Michael Jelenic, executive producers/written by; Peter Rida Michail and Peggy Regan, producers; Ken McIntyre and Dave Stone, directed by; Luke Cormican, supervising director; Eric J. Pringle, animation director	Cartoon Network
2018 (70th)	We Bare Bears	"Hurricane Hal"	Daniel Chong, Rob Sorcher, Brian A. Miller, Jennifer Pelphrey and Curtis Lelash, executive producers; Carrie Wilksen, producer; Randy Myers, supervising producer; Sang Yup Lee and Louie Zong, written by; Mikey Heller, story by; Manny Hernandez, supervising director; Robert Alvarez, Kevin Petrilak and Sechang Kwak, animation directors	Cartoon Network
2019 (71st)
2019 (71st)	Love, Death & Robots	"The Witness"	David Fincher, Tim Miller, Jennifer Miller and Joshua Donen, executive producers; Victoria Howard, supervising producer; Gennie Rim, producer; Alberto Mielgo, written by/directed by; Gabriele Pennacchioli, supervising director	Netflix
2019 (71st)	Robot Chicken	"Why Is It Wet?"	Seth Green and Matthew Senreich, executive producers/written by; John Harvatine IV, Eric Towner, Keith Crofford and Mike Lazzo, executive producers; Tom Root and Doug Goldstein, executive producers/head writers; Margaret M. Dean, supervising producer; Ollie Green, producer; Mike Fasolo, Kiel Kennedy, Michael Poisson and Ellory Smith, written by; Tom Sheppard, written by/directed by; Alex Kamer, animation director; Scott DaRos, co-animation director; Matt Sheldon, assistant director	Adult Swim
2019 (71st)	SpongeBob SquarePants	"Plankton Paranoia"	Stephen Hillenburg, executive producer; Marc Ceccarelli and Vincent Waller, supervising producers; Jennie Monica, produced by; Luke Brookshier, written by; Adam Paloian and Alan Smart, supervising directors; Tom Yasumi, animation director	Nickelodeon
2019 (71st)	Steven Universe	"Reunited"	Rebecca Sugar, executive producer/story by; Rob Sorcher, Brian A. Miller, Jennifer Pelphrey and Curtis Lelash, executive producers; Jackie Buscarino, producer; Paul Villeco, Katie Mitroff, Jeff Liu and Miki Brewster, written by; Matt Burnett, Ben Levin, Kat Morris and Tom Herpich, story by; Joe Johnston, story by/supervising director; Nick DeMayo, animation director; Kimson Albert and Maureen Mlynarczyk; sheet timing	Cartoon Network
2019 (71st)	Teen Titans Go!	"Nostalgia Is Not a Substitute for an Actual Story"	Sam Register, Aaron Horvath and Michael Jelenic, executive producers; Peter Rida Michail and Peggy Regan, producers; Amy Wolfram, written by; James Krenzke, directed by; Luke Cormican, supervising director; Eric J. Pringle, animation director	Cartoon Network

=== 2020s ===
Year	Program	Episode	Nominees	Network
2020 (72nd)
2020 (72nd)	Forky Asks a Question	"What Is Love?"	Bob Peterson, director/writer; Mark Nielsen, producer	Disney+
2020 (72nd)	Robot Chicken	"Santa's Dead (Spoiler Alert) Holiday Murder Thing Special"	Matthew Senreich and Seth Green, executive producers/written by; Tom Root and Doug Goldstein, executive producers/head writers; Keith Crofford, Mike Lazzo, Eric Towner and John Harvatine IV, executive producers; Tom Sheppard, co-executive producer/written by/directed by; Ollie Green, producer; Whitney Loveall, produced by; Deirdre Devlin, Mike Fasolo, Jamie Loftus, Harmony McElligott, Breckin Meyer and Michael Poisson, written by; Alex Kamer, animation director	Adult Swim
2020 (72nd)	Steven Universe Future	"Fragments"	Jennifer Pelphrey, Brian A. Miller, Rob Sorcher and Tramm Wigzell, executive producers; Rebecca Sugar, executive producer/story by; Kat Morris and Alonso Ramirez Ramos, co-executive producers/directed by/story by; Jackie Buscarino, producer; Lamar Abrams and Miki Brewster, written by; Jack Pendarvis, Kate Tsang, Taneka Stotts, Joe Johnston and Hilary Florido, story by; Nick DeMayo, animation director; Maureen Mlynarczyk and Sarah Gencarelli, sheet timings	Cartoon Network
2021 (73rd)
2021 (73rd)	Love, Death & Robots	"Ice"	David Fincher, Tim Miller, Jennifer Miller, Joshua Donen and Andrew Ruhemann, executive producers; Cara Speller, executive producer/produced by; Victoria Howard, supervising producer; Philip Gelatt, teleplay by; Robert Valley, directed by; Jennifer Yuh Nelson, supervising director	Netflix
2021 (73rd)	Maggie Simpson in: The Force Awakens from Its Nap		James L. Brooks, Matt Groening, Matt Selman, Richard Sakai, Denise Sirkot and Richard Raynis, produced by; Tom Klein, animation producer; Joel H. Cohen, Al Jean and Michael Price, written by; David Silverman, directed by; Acacia Caputo, K.C. Johnson and Mike Frank Polcino, animation timers	Disney+
2021 (73rd)	Once Upon a Snowman		Jennifer Lee, executive producer; Nicole P. Hearon and Peter Del Vecho, produced by; Dan Abraham and Trent Correy, written by/directed by	Disney+
2021 (73rd)	Robot Chicken	"Endgame"	Seth Green and Matthew Senreich, executive producers/written by; John Harvatine IV, Eric Towner, Keith Crofford and Mike Lazzo, executive producers; Tom Root and Doug Goldstein, executive producers/head writers; Tom Sheppard, co-executive producer/written by/directed by; Whitney Loveall, produced by; Ollie Green, producer; Mike Fasolo, Jared Gruszecki, Harmony McElligott, Michael Poisson and Ellory Smith, written by; Alex Kamer, animation director	Adult Swim
2022 (74th)
2022 (74th)	Love, Death & Robots	"Jibaro"	David Fincher, Tim Miller, Jennifer Miller, Joshua Donen and Sergio Jimenez, executive producers; Victoria Howard, supervising producer; Jennifer Yuh Nelson, supervising director; Alberto Mielgo, written by/directed by	Netflix
2022 (74th)	The Boys Presents: Diabolical	"John and Sun-Hee"	Simon Racioppa, Eric Kripke, Seth Rogen, Evan Goldberg, James Weaver, Neal H. Moritz, Pavun Shetty, Ori Marmur, Ken F. Levin, Jason Netter, Garth Ennis, Darick Robertson, Michaela Starr, Loreli Alanís, Chris Prynoski, Shannon Prynoski and Ben Kalina, executive producers; Andy Samberg, written by; Steve Ahn, directed by; Giancarlo Volpe, supervising director; Meredith Lane, voice director	Prime Video
2022 (74th)	Robot Chicken	"Happy Russian Deathdog Dolloween 2 U"	Matthew Senreich and Seth Green, executive producers/written by; Tom Root and Doug Goldstein, executive producers/head writers; Eric Towner, John Harvatine IV, Keith Crofford and Walter Newman, executive producers; Tom Sheppard, co-executive producer/written by/directed by; Kate Crandall and Laura Pepper, produced by; Maggie Cannan, Mike Fasolo, Michael Poisson, Ellory Smith and Cody Ziglar, written by; Chris Calvi and Kurt Firla, animation directors; Ollie Green, producer	Adult Swim
2022 (74th)	Star Wars: Visions	"The Duel"	James Waugh, Jacqui Lopez and Josh Rimes, executive producers; Justin Leach, co-executive producer; Kanako Shirasaki and Tetsuro Satomi, producers; Omi Nagahata, animation producer; Takanobu Mizuno, directed by; Mitsuyasu Sakai, written by	Disney+
2022 (74th)	When Billie Met Lisa		James L. Brooks, Matt Groening, Matt Selman, Richard Sakai, Denise Sirkot and Richard Raynis, produced by; Al Jean and David Mirkin, produced by/written by; Tom Klein, animation producer; Elisabeth Kiernan Averick, Cesar Mazariegos and Broti Gupta, written by; David Silverman, directed by; Mike Frank Polcino and Cyndi Tang, animation timers	Disney+
2023 (75th)
2023 (75th)	No award given. (Note: The Television Academy noted: "Submissions were prescreened to determine nominations. None of the submissions received nine-tenths approval, resulting in no nominations this year.")			
2024 (76th)	Award merged with Primetime Emmy Award for Outstanding Animated Program.			

== Programs with multiple wins ==
3 wins

- Love, Death & Robots
- Robot Chicken

2 wins

- Adventure Time
- Mickey Mouse

== Programs with multiple nominations ==
12 nominations

- Robot Chicken

9 nominations

- Adventure Time

5 nominations

- Regular Show
- Steven Universe

4 nominations

- Mickey Mouse
- SpongeBob SquarePants

3 nominations

- Love, Death & Robots
- Phineas and Ferb
- Teen Titans Go!

2 nominations

- Chowder

== Total awards by network ==
- Cartoon Network – 4
- Adult Swim – 3
- Netflix - 3
- ABC – 1
- Disney – 1
- Disney.com – 1
- Disney+ – 1

== See also ==
- List of animation awards
