= List of Tig n' Seek episodes =

Tig n' Seek is an American animated television series created by Myke Chilian for Cartoon Network. The show consists of 4 seasons, which all have 20 episodes, totaling 80 episodes throughout the whole series.

== Series overview ==
Season	Episodes	Originally released
Pilot		November 24, 2017
1	20	July 23, 2020
2	20	March 11, 2021
3	20	September 16, 2021
4	20	May 26, 2022

== Episodes ==
=== Pilot (2017) ===
Title	Directed by	Written and storyboarded by	Original release date	Prod. code
"Tiggle Winks"	Nick Cross (art), and Robert Alvarez (animation)	Myke Chilian	November 24, 2017 (CN App); January 8, 2018 (Online)	100
Tiggy and his pet cat Gweeseeks (who work at the Department of Lost & Found) are tasked by their boss to find a discontinued exercise gadget called the Abba-Ka-Dabby so that he can achieve muscles, but Tiggy and Gweeseeks discover something sinister at the old abandoned Abba-Ka-Dabby factory.

=== Season 1 (2020) ===
No. overall	No. in season	Title	Written and storyboarded by	Story by	Original release date	Cartoon Network air date	Prod. code	U.S. linear viewers (millions)
1	1	"The Five Rules of Finding"	Myke Chilian, Nick Cross, Dodge Greenley, Polly Guo	Sarah Bellardini, Brenan Campbell, Myke Chilian, Nick Cross & Jordan Harris	July 23, 2020	August 6, 2021	TNS-003	0.18
Tiggy and Gweeseek use Chief's Five Rules of Finding handbook to discover their own method of finding and locating Boss' missing tie.
2	2	"Cat Burglar"	Dodge Greenley & Polly Guo	Sarah Bellardini, Brenan Campbell & Jordan Harris	July 23, 2020	August 6, 2021	TNS-015	0.15
While Tiggy and Boss work hard to cover their tracks after they're caught up in a cat burglary, a new churro cart catches Gweeseek's eye.: Guest star: Sam Brown as Churro Vendor
3	3	"Cat Toy of the Future"	Myke Chilian, Nick Cross, Mark Maxey & Dan O'Connor	Sarah Bellardini, Brenan Campbell, Myke Chilian, Nick Cross & Jordan Harris	July 23, 2020	August 13, 2021	TNS-002	0.24
Tiggy's attempt to create a new toy for Gweeseek turns the Department of Lost & Found into a Cat Central.
4	4	"Picky Prangle"	Myke Chilian, Nick Cross, Dodge Greenley & Polly Guo	Sarah Bellardini, Brenan Campbell & Jordan Harris	July 23, 2020	August 13, 2021	TNS-009	0.20
It's Pie's Day, Prangle Penguin is already way behind on his strawberry pie deliveries. Hoping to improve their helpfulness rating, Tiggy and Gweeseek take on the task of pie-making, even as things quickly take a not-so-sweet turn.
5	5	"Lost in the Lost & Found"	Rachel Buecheler, Myke Chilian, Nick Cross, Mark Maxey & Dan O'Connor	Sarah Bellardini, Brenan Campbell, Myke Chilian, Nick Cross & Jordan Harris	July 23, 2020	August 27, 2021	TNS-005	0.21
When Boss sends Tiggy and Gweeseek into the cellar to fetch a tuba, Tiggy must be brave and overcome his fears of the "Cellar Feller".
6	6	"Eggy Weggy"	Rachel Buecheler & Mark Maxey	Sarah Bellardini, Brenan Campbell & Jordan Harris	July 23, 2020	TBA	TNS-011	N/A
Tiggy and Gweeseek realize parenting is difficult after they bring home an abandoned egg that's due to hatch any minute.
7	7	"Baby and the Dog"	Rachel Buecheler, Myke Chilian & Mark Maxey	Sarah Bellardini, Brenan Campbell & Jordan Harris	July 23, 2020	August 27, 2021	TNS-014	0.19
On a mission to find an orange tennis ball, Tiggy and Gweeseek encounter their worst nightmares: a baby and a dog.
8	8	"The Tig-Tale Heart"	Myke Chilian, Nick Cross, Sydney Sharp & Ron Stanage	Sarah Bellardini, Brenan Campbell, Myke Chilian, Nick Cross & Jordan Harris	July 23, 2020	August 20, 2021	TNS-010	0.16
When the office becomes obsessed with a Baby Bobo toy that Tiggy and Gweeseek found, a jealous Tiggy decides to put an end to its song and dance moves for good.
9	9	"Who's This Guy?"	Myke Chilian, Nick Cross, Dodge Greenley & Polly Guo	Sarah Bellardini, Brenan Campbell, Myke Chilian, Nick Cross & Jordan Harris	July 23, 2020	September 3, 2021	TNS-006	0.16
This Guy is more wound up than usual and Tiggy encourages him to take a relaxing day off. Left in the office, Tiggy and Gweeseek learn it is harder than they thought to keep things orderly.
10	10	"The Tooth of Manhood"	Rachel Buecheler & Mark Maxey	Sarah Bellardini, Brenan Campbell & Jordan Harris	July 23, 2020	TBA	TNS-004	N/A
After losing a tooth and deciding it is time to grow up and be serious, Tiggy risks ruining the rockin' party he planned for Gweeseek's Gotcha Day.
11	11	"The Tiggy Trap"	Sydney Sharp & Ron Stanage	Sarah Bellardini, Brenan Campbell & Jordan Harris	July 23, 2020	TBA	TNS-019	N/A
Tiggy and Boss square off against This Guy and Nuritza, the reigning champs of office charades. When Nuritza and This Guy's fight derails the game, Tiggy sets aside his desire to win broker peace between friends.
12	12	"An Easy Fix"	Rachel Buecheler & Mark Maxey	Sarah Bellardini, Brenan Campbell & Jordan Harris	July 23, 2020	October 8, 2021	TNS-008	0.18
After Tiggy questions Nuritza's handy-rabbit skills, the two trade place, and Tiggy discovers that the job of fixing things comes with a lot more challenges than finding things.
13	13	"Tiny Tiggy Tennis"	Dodge Greenley & Sydney Sharp	Sarah Bellardini, Brenan Campbell & Jordan Harris	July 23, 2020	October 1, 2021	TNS-021	0.11
In his quest to find a game he actually win, Tiggy stumbles upon a table tennis set. While his wish of beating (almost) everyone in the office comes true, the real challenge becomes scheduling a match against Boss.
14	14	"Champ"	Dodge Greenley & Polly Guo	Sarah Bellardini, Brenan Campbell & Jordan Harris	July 23, 2020	TBA	TNS-012	N/A
Boss' nephew Champ visits the office for the day and Tiggy discovers that this "good boy" is really a naughty little kid who will do anything to get his way.
15	15	"Tig Sawyer"	Polly Guo & Mark Maxey	Sarah Bellardini, Brenan Campbell & Jordan Harris	July 23, 2020	TBA	TNS-026	N/A
Nuritza's job is to repaint the office walls, but she manages to trick Tiggy and Gweeseek into painting the walls for her.
16	16	"Just Kitten"	Nick Cross, Dodge Greenley & Polly Guo	Sarah Bellardini, Brenan Campbell & Jordan Harris	July 23, 2020	October 1, 2021	TNS-018	0.09
Tiggy can't get Gweeseek to stop distracting him, but after she finds a new prime stop atop This Guy's head, a clingy Tiggy must deal with his feelings of jealousy and abandonment.
17	17	"The Search Engine"	Myke Chilian, Nick Cross, Sydney Sharp & Ron Stanage	Sarah Bellardini, Brenan Campbell, Myke Chilian, Nick Cross & Jordan Harris	July 23, 2020	September 17, 2021	TNS-007	0.11
On a mission to recover a pair of fuzzy dice from the junkyard, Tiggy and Gweeseek battle it out without Boss' brand-new robot, Search Engine, to prove they're the better finders.
18	18	"Seeking Safety"	Rachel Buecheler & Mark Maxey	Sarah Bellardini, Brenan Campbell & Jordan Harris	July 23, 2020	TBA	TNS-017	N/A
After Tiggy learns from This Guy that cats really don't have nine lives, he becomes obsessed with making life in the office extra save for an adventurous Gweeseek.
19	19	"The Department of Lost Gold"	Sydney Sharp & Ron Stanage	Sarah Bellardini, Brenan Campbell & Jordan Harris	July 23, 2020	TBA	TNS-013	N/A
When Tiggy, Gweeseek and Nuritza discover a mysterious map, the promise of buried treasure and gold threatens to make these friends turn on each other.
20	20	"Within the Walls"	Sydney Sharp & Ron Stanage	Sarah Bellardini, Brenan Campbell & Jordan Harris	July 23, 2020	October 15, 2021	TNS-016	0.14
When Gweeseek crawls into the Department walls, Tiggy thinks she's been abducted by ghosts that haunt the Department.

=== Season 2 (2021) ===
No. overall	No. in season	Title	Written and storyboarded by	Story by	Original release date	Cartoon Network air date	Prod. code	U.S. linear viewers (millions)
21	1	"The Curse"	Rachel Buecheler & Ron Stanage	Jordan Harris, Sarah Bellardini & Brenan Campbell	March 11, 2021	TBA	TNS-028	N/A
Tiggy and Gweeseek discover a terrifying music box and with it, a curse.
22	2	"Breaking News"	Rachel Buecheler & Mark Maxey	Jordan Harris, Sarah Bellardini & Brenan Campbell	March 11, 2021	TBA	TNS-020	N/A
Tiggy and Gweeseek rope the crew into a fake finding mission in order to impress a local newspaper reporter.
23	3	"Tiggy Two-Shoes"	Polly Guo & Mark Maxey	Jordan Harris, Sarah Bellardini & Brenan Campbell	March 11, 2021	September 17, 2021	TNS-023	0.11
Tiggy acts out to prove he can be a bad boy to Nuritza.
24	4	"Gloppy Joe's"	Dodge Greenley & Sydney Sharp	Jordan Harris, Sarah Bellardini & Brenan Campbell	March 11, 2021	TBA	TNS-024	N/A
Tiggy causes chaos in the Department when he pretends to love Boss' cooking.
25	5	"Cookie Trouble"	Dodge Greenley & Sydney Sharp	Jordan Harris, Sarah Bellardini & Brenan Campbell	March 11, 2021	September 24, 2021	TNS-027	N/A
Tiggy and Gweeseek face their most devious foe yet: a cookie scout named Skippy.
26	6	"Nibbles"	Dodge Greenley, Sydney Sharp & Chris Allison	Jordan Harris, Sarah Bellardini & Brenan Campbell	March 11, 2021	TBA	TNS-022	N/A
Tiggy passes himself off as a cat expert to Prangle Penguin with disastrous results.
27	7	"Tragic Magic"	Rachel Buecheler & Ron Stanage	Jordan Harris, Sarah Bellardini & Brenan Campbell	March 11, 2021	TBA	TNS-025	N/A
When Tiggy tests out a new magic trick, people in the office mysteriously disappear.
28	8	"Hair Today"	Polly Guo & Mark Maxey	Jordan Harris, Sarah Bellardini & Brenan Campbell	March 11, 2021	September 3, 2021	TNS-031	0.16
A mix-up at the groomers causes Tiggy to mistake a cranky, hairless cat for Gweeseek.: Guest star: Louie Anderson as Chester, the pet groomer
29	9	"The Decider"	Polly Guo & Mark Maxey	Jordan Harris, Sarah Bellardini & Brenan Campbell	March 11, 2021	October 15, 2021	TNS-029	0.19
When Boss and Nuritza fight over a large pencil, Tiggy must decide who keeps it.
30	10	"Game Over"	Rachel Buecheler & David de Rooij	Jordan Harris, Sarah Bellardini & Brenan Campbell	March 11, 2021	October 8, 2021	TNS-030	0.16
In a spoof of a afterschool special, an arcade game obsession pushes Tiggy and Gweeseek past the brink of sanity, causing This Guy to become worried and suspicious.
31	11	"Fretting Zoo"	Pat Pakula & Howie Perry	Jordan Harris, Sarah Bellardini, Brenan Campbell & Polly Guo	March 11, 2021	TBA	TNS-032	N/A
Tiggy seeks vengeance upon an adorable baby goat who humiliated him.: Guest star: Les Claypool as Farmer Gus
32	12	"The Ring"	Polly Guo & Mark Maxey	Jordan Harris, Sarah Bellardini & Brenan Campbell	March 11, 2021	September 24, 2021	TNS-034	0.14
Tiggy and Prangle Penguin compete for Mrs. Grendelson's heart.
33	13	"The Boss Method"	Rachel Buecheler & David de Rooij	Jordan Harris, Sarah Bellardini & Brenan Campbell	March 11, 2021	TBA	TNS-033	N/A
Tiggy helps Boss impressive his father, Chief. Who came to the department, to request Boss to find his mother's vase.: Guest star: John O'Hurley as Chief
34	14	"Just One Lil’ Thing"	Jojo Baptista & Stu Livingston	Jordan Harris, Sarah Bellardini & Brenan Campbell	March 11, 2021	TBA	TNS-035	N/A
Mrs. Grendelson accuses Prangle Penguin of dirtying her laundry. Tiggy and Gweeseek must prove his innocence.
35	15	"Just Kitten 2: The Puppet Master"	Rachel Buecheler & David de Rooij	Jordan Harris, Sarah Bellardini & Brenan Campbell	March 11, 2021	TBA	TNS-036	N/A
Tiggy and Gweeseek team up with their old friend, Slick Chiggins, to find a missing item at the local puppet theater.: Guest star: Natalie Palamides as Puppeteer, Alligator Al & Security guard puppet
36	16	"A Night at the Ballet"	Jojo Baptista & Tom Smith	Jordan Harris, Sarah Bellardini & Brenan Campbell	March 11, 2021	TBA	TNS-038	N/A
When Prangle Penguin discovers his mom has a date to the ballet, he enlists Tiggy and Gweeseek to find out who it is.
37	17	"Must Love Bugs"	Polly Guo, Mark Maxey, Jojo Baptista & Danica Dickison	Jordan Harris, Sarah Bellardini & Brenan Campbell	March 11, 2021	August 20, 2021	TNS-040	0.13
Tiggy struggles to keep his cool in front of his new crush while searching for her lost insect.: Guest star: Charlyne Yi as Georgia
38	18	"Can You Believe This Guy?"	Polly Guo & Mark Maxey	Jordan Harris, Sarah Bellardini & Brenan Campbell	March 11, 2021	TBA	TNS-037	N/A
Tiggy and Gweeseek ruin This Guy's art piece before the night of his opening.
39	19	"Fan Friction"	Jojo Baptista & Rachel Buecheler	Jordan Harris, Sarah Bellardini & Brenan Campbell	March 11, 2021	TBA	TNS-039	N/A
Tiggy takes issue with This Guy's Department of Lost & Found fan fiction.
40	20	"Development Shorts"	Myke Chilian, Nick Cross, Adam Paloian, Dodge Greenley & Polly Guo	Jordan Harris, Sarah Bellardini, Brenan Campbell, Myke Chilian & Nick Cross	March 11, 2021	TBA	TNS-001	N/A
A sneak peek into the beginnings of Tiggy and Gweeseek with four developed shorts: Zaps, Lost Bike, Tiggycise and Knot-O-Matic.

=== Season 3 (2021) ===
No. overall	No. in season	Title	Written by	Storyboarded by	Original release date	Prod. code
41	1	"The Twilight Calzone"	Sarah Bellardini, Brenan Campbell, & Jordan Harris	Rachel Buecheler, Nick Bertonazzi, & Nick Cross	September 16, 2021	TNS-041
Tiggy and Prangle suspect that Skippy's calzone recipe contains a sinister secret ingredient.
42	2	"Gweeseek’s Big Break"	Sarah Bellardini, Brenan Campbell, & Jordan Harris	Polly Guo, Mark Maxey, & Nick Cross	September 16, 2021	TNS-042
When Gweeseek is cast in a cat food commercial, Tiggy goes overboard trying to protect artistic integrity.: Guest star: Eric Bauza as himself
43	3	"Boss: Bear in the City"	Sarah Bellardini, Brenan Campbell, & Jordan Harris	JoJo Baptista & Danica Dickison	September 16, 2021	TNS-043
Tiggy and Gweeseek go on a backyard camping expedition where the bears are not what they seem.
44	4	"Hotel Nuritza"	Sarah Bellardini, Brenan Campbell, & Jordan Harris	Rachel Buecheler, Nick Bertonazzi, Nick Cross, & Myke Chilian	September 16, 2021	TNS-044
When a local celebrity mistakes the Department for a hotel, Tiggy and Nuritza try to strike it rich.
45	5	"Chester’s Roasting on a Open Fire"	Sarah Bellardini, Brenan Campbell, & Jordan Harris	Polly Guo & Mark Maxey	September 16, 2021	TNS-045
Tiggy stops at nothing to help his friend Chester achieve his lifelong dream of becoming a firefighter.
46	6	"Polterguy"	Sarah Bellardini, Brenan Campbell, Jordan Harris, & Brian Wysol	JoJo Baptista & Danica Dickison	September 16, 2021	TNS-046
To save Tiggy on Halloween, This Guy must confront his fear of the supernatural.
47	7	"Obedience Fool"	Sarah Bellardini, Brenan Campbell, Scott Gairdner, & Jordan Harris	Rachel Buecheler, Myke Chilian, & Nora Meek	September 16, 2021	TNS-047
When Gweeseek is sent to obedience school, Tiggy goes undercover as a cat to keep her on track.
48	8	"The Boss of Me"	Sarah Bellardini, Brenan Campbell, Jordan Harris, & Andrew Schrader	Polly Guo & Mark Maxey	September 16, 2021	TNS-048
After Skippy takes over the Lost and Found, Tig has no choice but to team up with the brattiest kid he knows: Champ.
49	9	"Dial K for Krinkles"	Sarah Bellardini, Sam Brown, Brenan Campbell, Jordan Harris, & Marissa Strickland	JoJo Baptista & Danica Dickison	September 16, 2021	TNS-049
When a prank call reveals This Guy’s loneliness, Tiggy pretends to be multiple characters to cheer him up.
50	10	"Mutiny on the Bossy"	Sam Brown, Brenan Campbell, Jordan Harris, & Andrew Schrader	Joe Apel, Rachel Buecheler, Chelsea McAlarney, & Bryan Newton	September 16, 2021	TNS-050
After watching a pirate movie, Boss worries that his crew might have their own mutinous intentions.
51	11	"Nuritza Sees It All"	Sam Brown, Brenan Campbell, Joelle Cornett, & Jordan Harris	Chris Allison & Ryan Kramer	September 16, 2021	TNS-051
52	12	"Gweeliens"	Sam Brown, Brenan Campbell, & Jordan Harris	Joe Apel, Abe Audish, JoJo Baptista, Chelsea McAlarney, & Bryan Newton	September 16, 2021	TBA
53	13	"Boss Off"	Sam Brown, Brenan Campbell, Scott Gairdner, & Jordan Harris	Rachel Buecheler & Danica Dickison	September 16, 2021	TBA
54	14	"Neighborhood Blotch"	Sam Brown, Brenan Campbell, Jordan Harris, & Andrew Schrader	JoJo Baptista & Sam Marin	September 16, 2021	TBA
55	15	"The Li'l Pipsqueaks in Pie in the Sky"	Sam Brown, Brenan Campbell, & Jordan Harris	Danica Dickison, Dax Wong, & Nick Cross	September 16, 2021	TNS-056
56	16	"Polite Pines"	Sam Brown, Brenan Campbell, Joelle Cornett, & Jordan Harris	JoJo Baptista & Mark Maxey	September 16, 2021	TNS-057
57	17	"Ball in the Family"	Sam Brown, Brenan Campbell, Kelly Lynne D'Angelo, & Jordan Harris	JoJo Baptista & Natasha Weir	September 16, 2021	TBA
58	18	"The Scam"	Sarah Bellardini, Sam Brown, Brenan Campbell, & Jordan Harris	Danica Dickison, Matt Marblo, & Chelsea McAlarney	September 16, 2021	TNS-059
59	19	"The President’s Hat"	Sam Brown, Brenan Campbell, Jordan Harris, & Brian Wysol	Ricky Chen & Sam Marin	September 16, 2021	TNS-058
60	20	"Ring II: Tigs of Our Lives"	Sam Brown, Brenan Campbell, Jordan Harris, & Brian Wysol	Ricky Chen & Sam Marin	September 16, 2021	TNS-061

=== Season 4 (2022) ===
No. overall	No. in season	Title	Written by	Storyboarded by	Original release date	Prod. code
61	1	"Pipsqueaks! The Musical"	Sarah Bellardini, Sam Brown, Brenan Campbell, & Jordan Harris	Diana Kidlaied & Fernando Puig	May 26, 2022	TNS-071
Tiggy helps the Lil' Pipsqueaks find a new hangout after accidentally destroying their clubhouse.
62	2	"Real Gweenius"	Sarah Bellardini, Brenan Campbell, Sam Brown, & Jordan Harris	Dan Becker & Graham Falk	May 26, 2022	TNS-070
63	3	"Must Gwee TV"	Sarah Bellardini, Brenda Campbell, Sam Brown, Abed Gheith, & Jordan Harris	Ricky Chen & Sam Marin	May 26, 2022	TNS-072
64	4	"A Bucket of Blub"	Sam Brown, Brenan Campbell, Kelly Lynne D'Angelo, & Jordan Harris	Polly Guo, Mark Maxey, & Brianna Chiong	May 26, 2022	TBA
65	5	"Wanted: Dumb or Alive"	Sam Brown, Brenan Campbell, & Jordan Harris	JoJo Baptista & Natasha Weir	May 26, 2022	TNS-063
66	6	"Uncle Sarkis"	Sarah Bellardini, Sam Brown, Brenan Campbell, & Jordan Harris	Ricky Chen & Sam Marin	May 26, 2022	TNS-064
67	7	"Rainy with a Chance of Clowns"	Sam Brown, Brenan Campbell, & Jordan Harris	Diana Kidlaied & Fernando Puig	May 26, 2022	TNS-068
68	8	"The Hand That Stamps the Paper"	Sam Brown, Brenan Campbell, & Jordan Harris	Charlotte Jackson & Megan Lawton	May 26, 2022	TBA
69	9	"American Jam Stand"	Sam Brown, Brenan Campbell, & Jordan Harris	JoJo Baptista & Natasha Weir	May 26, 2022	TNS-065
70	10	"Wack E. Doodle Dandy"	Sam Brown, Brenan Campbell, & Jordan Harris	Dan Becker & Megan Lawton	May 26, 2022	TNS-066
71	11	"Tiny Tiggy Tennis Shoes"	Sarah Bellardini, Sam Brown, Brenan Campbell, & Jordan Harris	JoJo Baptista & Natasha Weir	May 26, 2022	TNS-080
72	12	"Twin Seeks"	Sarah Bellardini, Sam Brown, Brenan Campbell, & Jordan Harris	Graham Falk & Fernando Puig	May 26, 2022	TNS-078
73	13	"The Marvelous Mrs. Penguinian"	Sarah Bellardini, Sam Brown, Brenan Campbell, & Jordan Harris	JoJo Baptista & Natasha Weir	May 26, 2022	TNS-077
74	14	"Hands on a Bowling Ball"	Sarah Bellardini, Sam Brown, Brenan Campbell, & Jordan Harris	Ricky Chen and Sam Marin	May 26, 2022	TNS-067
75	15	"Search Engine MXII"	Sarah Bellardini, Sam Brown, Brenan Campbell, & Jordan Harris	JoJo Baptista & Natasha Weir	May 26, 2022	TNS-075
76	16	"The Irate Outdoors"	Sarah Bellardini, Sam Brown, Brenan Campbell, & Jordan Harris	Sam Marin & Diana Kidlaied	May 26, 2022	TNS-076
77	17	"Night of the Scooper"	Sarah Bellardini, Sam Brown, Brenan Campbell, Jordan Harris, Andrew Schrader, & Brian Wysol	JoJo Baptista & Natasha Weir	May 26, 2022	TNS-069
78	18	"Tiggy Saves Christmas"	Sarah Bellardini, Sam Brown, Brenan Campbell, & Jordan Harris	Sam Marin	May 26, 2022	TNS-079
79	19	"Tig n' Seek Nights"	Sarah Bellardini, Sam Brown, Brenan Campbell, & Jordan Harris	JoJo Baptista, Natasha Weir, & Graham Falk	May 26, 2022	TBA
80	20	"Tig n' Seek Nights"	Sarah Bellardini, Sam Brown, Brenan Campbell, & Jordan Harris	JoJo Baptista, Natasha Weir, & Graham Falk	May 26, 2022	TBA
Gweeseek goes out on an adventure that involves chasing her favourite toy and getting into trouble, while Tiggy, Boss and Prangle think they're invisible.: This episode is dedicated to Louie Anderson who died on January 21, 2022.
