= Mao Mao: Heroes of Pure Heart =

American animated television series

- Genre: Action; Adventure; Comedy
- Created by: Parker Simmons
- Directed by: Michael Moloney
- Voices of: Parker Simmons; Griffith Kimmins; Lika Leong; Christopher McCulloch; Debra Wilson; Tommy Blacha
- Theme music composer: Mint Potion Studios
- Opening theme: "I Love You Mao Mao" (performed by Kaho Kidoguchi)
- Composer: Mint Potion Studios
- Country of origin: United States
- Original language: English
- No. of seasons: 1
- No. of episodes: 40

Production
- Executive producers: Parker Simmons; Chris Prynoski; Shannon Prynoski; Jennifer Pelphrey; Tramm Wigzell; Brian A. Miller; Rob Sorcher
- Producer: Laura Allen
- Editor: Todd Raleigh
- Running time: 11 minutes
- Production companies: Titmouse, Inc. (Note: Animation co-supported by a Malaysia-based team at Inspidea.); Cartoon Network Studios

Original release
- Network: Cartoon Network
- Release: July 1, 2019 – July 17, 2020

Mao Mao: Heroes of Pure Heart is an American animated television series created by Parker Simmons for Cartoon Network. It was co-produced between Cartoon Network Studios and Titmouse, Inc. The series follows the adventures of the titular character, Mao Mao, along with Badgerclops and Adorabat as they protect the citizens of Pure Heart Valley from the forces of evil, after accidentally being broken by Mao Mao and Badgerclops.

The series is based on a short film, produced for the annual Titmouse Inc. "5-Second Day" event in 2014. Following positive feedback from the audience and interest from Chris Prynoski, a 7-minute pilot was developed. It was pitched to Cartoon Network in 2017 and greenlit for a full series, with a 95-week deadline to meet the television release schedule. The show's animation was created in Adobe Animate and After Effects, produced by Titmouse, Inc. with the support from Malaysian animation studio Inspidea. Its music was composed by Mint Potion Studios, led by Jake Kaufman.

Mao Mao: Heroes of Pure Heart was announced on May 20, 2019 alongside Tig n' Seek, and later debuted on July 1, 2019. The first 30 episodes were released on HBO Max in September 1, 2020, with the final 10 episodes on January 1, 2021. It was received positively by critics, getting praise for its narrative, storytelling, action, and character dynamics. It received five nominations, one of which was won, for Outstanding Performer in an Animated Program by Parker Simmons for his voice acting performance. A second season was confirmed to be in production during the San Diego Comic-Con at Home event on July 23, 2020. In August 2022, the show was removed from HBO Max, as a result of the Warner Bros. Discovery merger, along with all references to the show from Cartoon Network's official websites, YouTube channels, and Twitter feeds.

== Premise ==
Mao Mao: Heroes of Pure Heart centers on the title character, Mao Mao, a daring cat who has high intentions for action and adventure. During one of his adventures, he gets stuck in a cute and cuddly town called Pure Heart Valley with his co-hero Badgerclops, a cyborg-armed badger, and meets Adorabat, a cute little bat. Together, the three go on adventures to protect the citizens of Pure Heart Valley from the forces of evil.

== Characters ==
The main characters in Mao Mao: Heroes of Pure Heart, from left to right: Mao Mao, Adorabat, and Badgerclops.

=== Main characters ===
- Mao Mao (voiced by Parker Simmons) a righteous yet uptight cat who gets stuck in Pure Heart Valley, where he spends time helping the citizens while also finding a way to fix the Ruby Pure Heart, which he inadvertently broke.
  - Colleen Clinkenbeard voices a young Mao Mao.
- Badgerclops (voiced by Griffith Kimmins) a sassy cyborg badger with a robotic arm and an eyepatch, and Mao Mao's co-hero and partner.
- Adorabat (voiced by Lika Leong) a cute, blue bat, with a yellow heart symbol and peg leg in place of her right leg.

=== Villains ===
==== Sky Pirates ====
- Orangusnake (voiced by Christopher McCulloch) an orangutan-snake hybrid pirate captain who wants to steal the Ruby Pure Heart to take over the world.
- Boss Hosstrich (voiced by Christopher McCulloch) a gentleman cybernetic ostrich pirate, that can shoot eggs from a cannon on his chest.
- Ramaraffe (voiced by Debra Wilson) a cybernetic giraffe pirate who can stretch her neck.
- Ratarang (voiced by Parker Simmons) a small rat pirate who can turn into a boomerang.
- Steel Wing (voiced by Tommy Blacha) a wyvern with metallic wings.
- Beef Master is a large water buffalo with a necklace made of bones.
- Thunder Fist is a gorilla who can produce electricity from his hands.

==== Thicket Thieves ====
- Tiny Toad (voiced by Mark Sheppard) a cyborg frog and the leader of the Thicket Thieves.
- Bullmozer (voiced by Parker Simmons) a mole with cybernetic arms and glasses.
- Ratracer (voiced by Lisa O'Hare) a female rat with a wheel in place of legs.

==== Others ====
- Rufus (voiced by Julian Barratt) a sly and cunning fox who swindles the Sweetypies of Pure Heart Valley.
- Reggie (voiced by Rich Fulcher) a raccoon and Rufus' sidekick.

=== Supporting characters ===
==== Pure Heart Valley Residents ====
- King Snugglemagne (voiced by Parker Simmons) a foppish lion king of Pure Heart Valley.
- Scoops (voiced by Debra Wilson) a small donkey who runs the news in Pure Heart Valley.
- Camille (voiced by Debra Wilson) a chameleon and royal magic-user in Pure Heart Valley.
- Honey is a flying squirrel and Camille's silent apprentice.
- Chef Rhett (voiced by Tommy Blacha) a royal chef of Pure Heart Valley.
- Pinky (voiced by Griffith Kimmins) a small pink rhinoceros who is considered disturbing by the residents of Pure Heart Valley.
- Ketchup (voiced by Debra Wilson) a pink fluffy gopher with strange interests.
- Kevin (voiced by Griffith Kimmins) a small blue porcupine with no fingers. He is afraid of everything.
- Chubbum (voiced by Tommy Blacha) is a friendly frog. His father sounds exactly like Mao Mao.
- Lucky (voiced by Tommy Blacha) a green hamster with glasses.
- Gary (voiced by Tommy Blacha) a crocodile who works as a cameraman.
- Cluckins (voiced by Christopher McCulloch) a chicken. Despite his appearance, he is 30 years old.
- Slim Pigguns (voiced by Parker Simmons) a yellow pig who works as a Pizza delivery man, who drives a monster truck.
- Chester Nutz (voiced by Griffith Kimmins) a tall brown porcupine. He is Kevin's older brother.
- Mail Mole (voiced by Chris Prynoski) a mole who is eager to get jobs done.
- Ol' Blue (voiced by Tommy Blacha) a blue dog who is a citizen of Pure Heart Valley. He is also a therapist and not easily impressed.
- Marion (voiced by Debra Wilson) a horse in Pure Heart Valley who is always working out.
- Benny (voiced by Christopher McCulloch) a yellow dog who is a citizen of Pure Heart Valley and Penny's husband.
- Penny (voiced by Lika Leong) a pink dog who is a citizen of Pure Heart Valley and Benny's wife.
- Farmer Bun (voiced by Parker Simmons) a pink rabbit who works at a farm.
- Muffins (voiced by Debra Wilson) a mouse in Pure Heart Valley who bakes muffins.
- Clark Lockjaw (voiced by Lika Leong) a small blue seal who is a news reporter in Pure Heart Valley.
- Silly Billy (voiced by Tommy Blacha) a violet elephant who is a news anchor in Pure Heart Valley.
- Teacher (voiced by Andy Daly) a teacher at Adorabat's school in Pure Heart Valley.

==== Mao Mao's family ====
- Shin Mao (voiced by Clancy Brown) Mao Mao's father, who he has a strained relationship with. He gifted Mao Mao his golden sword while giving his sisters more impressive weapons. It is revealed that he is small like Mao Mao and ultimately learns to be more appreciative of his son.
- Brunhilde, Mao a large knight with a golden spear that can pierce anything.
- Amala, a ninja with a golden scarf that grants the wearer supersonic flight.
- Minori, a monk with a golden hat that can store infinite items.
- Selene, A martial, an artist with golden bangles that grant impenetrable defense.
- Aurelia, A sorcerer with golden eye contact that offers incredible sight.
- Mao Mao's mother, who once informed her son that his father was visiting.
- Uncle Jim Jim (voiced by Parker Simmons) Mao Mao's uncle, who despite being a spirit, is still technically alive and possibly a barbarian.
- Great-Great Paternal Grandfather Twig (voiced by Griffith Kimmins) Mao Mao's grandfather, who was a sumo warrior.
- Great-Great Aunt Blackbeard (voiced by Colleen Clinkenbeard) Mao Mao's aunt, who was a pirate warrior.
- Aunt Gloria, Mao Mao's aunt and a secondary character who appears in "Lonely Kid".

==== Others ====
- Bao Bao (voiced by Chris Prynoski) a Shiba Inu dog and Mao Mao's old partner.
- Bobo Chan (voiced by Debra Wilson) a young monster who Badgerclops adopts after seeing her hatch from an egg. She quickly grows to full size after Badgerclops had to leave her in the wild. Bobo Chan rescues the heroes when the Sky Pirates toss them off a cliff.
- Tanya Keys (voiced by Ming-Na Wen) a female tanuki and former lover of Mao Mao, who makes a living as a bounty hunter. She can transform herself and leafs into people and objects.
- Meditatin' Melvin (voiced by Dana Snyder) a meditating monkey who achieved the ability to astral project to avoid going to the dentist.
- Eugene (voiced by Randall Park) Adorabat's father. He has had a strained relationship with his daughter ever since his wife was killed by a cave dragon.
- Sonara, Adorabat's mother. A cave dragon from Pure Heart Valley attacked and killed her before the events of the series.

== Episodes ==
No. overall	No. in season	Title	Written and storyboarded by	Story by	Original release date	Prod. code	U.S viewers (millions)
1	1	"I Love You Mao Mao"	Nathanael H. Jones and Alexandria Kwan	Akira "Mark" Fujita, Michael Moloney, and Parker Simmons	July 1, 2019 (Note: This episode was first released online on May 20, 2019. It also aired as a sneak peek on June 1, 2019.)	MM101	0.44 (Sneak Peek); 0.27 (Premiere)
Adventurers Mao Mao and Badgerclops accidentally damage the Pure Heart that protects Pure Heart Valley from the dangers of the world. Together with daring native Adorabat, the trio must protect the town from villains who plan to steal the Pure Heart including the sinister pirate, Orangusnake.
2	2	"Perfect Adventure"	Michael Moloney and Parker Simmons	Akira "Mark" Fujita, Michael Moloney, and Parker Simmons	July 1, 2019 (Note: This episode was first released online on June 3, 2019.)	MM102	0.26
Adorabat fears that Mao Mao will give up adventuring due to the town's simplistic lifestyle so she makes up an adventure for Mao Mao and Badgerclops to follow. Things slowly start to get out of hand when Adorabat ends up leading the other two into more and more situations until she puts them all in danger.
3	3	"No Shortcuts"	Phil Ahn and Allison Craig	Akira "Mark" Fujita, Michael Moloney, and Parker Simmons	July 8, 2019 (Note: This episode was first released online on June 28, 2019.)	MM107	0.30
Feeling that she is useless in battle, Adorabat has Badgerclops create a cybernetic peg leg dubbed the Mega-Mech to aid her. However, the weapon proves to be too much for her. When Mao Mao insists on getting rid of it, Adorabat races off to face Orangusnake on her own and ends up getting captured and used for his latest weapon.
4	4	"Ultraclops"	Griffith Kimmins and Nora Meek	Akira "Mark" Fujita, Michael Moloney, and Parker Simmons	July 8, 2019	MM106	0.28
Badgerclops is upset that Mao Mao and Adorabat always blow him off. When a giant monster wreaks havoc, Camille, the royal magic user, gives Badgerclops a necklace to turn him into a giant so that he can combat it. Badgerclops ends up liking being big as no one can ignore him and he can do whatever he wants, upsetting the Pure Heart Valley Sweetypies.
5	5	"Mao Mao's Bike Adventure"	Griffith Kimmins and Nora Meek	Akira "Mark" Fujita, Michael Moloney, and Parker Simmons	July 15, 2019	MM114	0.38
Mao Mao insists that "a hero is never wrong", which annoys Badgerclops and Adorabat when he refuses to listen to reason. His Aero-Bike gets stolen in the middle of the night and he immediately places the blame on the Sweetypies of Pure Heart Valley despite the fact that they cannot steal anything and evidence pointing to Orangusnake's own doing.
6	6	"Breakup"	Phil Ahn and Allison Craig	Akira "Mark" Fujita, Michael Moloney, and Parker Simmons	July 15, 2019	MM104	0.35
Adorabat is upset at the fact that Mao Mao and Badgerclops have had numerous adventures together and she feels left out. After accidentally instigating a fight between the two, Adorabat gets her chance to hang out with them individually. Unfortunately for her, she realizes that spending quality time with each of them is annoying and tries to get them back together.
7	7	"Not Impressed"	Griffith Kimmins and Nora Meek	Akira "Mark" Fujita, Michael Moloney, and Parker Simmons	July 22, 2019	MM108	0.41
Mao Mao is perturbed when a Sweetypie in Pure Heart Valley named Ol' Blue does not find Mao Mao's abilities impressive. Mao Mao finds himself desperately trying to get some kind of validation from the mopey resident, unaware of the fact that his feelings are psychologically linked to his own father issues.
8	8	"Enemy Mime"	Nathanael H. Jones and Alexandria Kwan	Akira "Mark" Fujita, Michael Moloney, and Parker Simmons	July 22, 2019	MM103	0.39
Pure Heart Valley is attacked by a giant pink blob that mimics whatever is in front of it. Mao Mao and Badgerclops find that they cannot directly fight it because it fights back and they cannot reason with it because it absorbs everything in its way. It is up to Adorabat to defeat it using the one thing she knows: magic tricks.
9	9	"Outfoxed"	Phil Ahn and Allison Craig	Akira "Mark" Fujita, Michael Moloney, and Parker Simmons	July 29, 2019	MM111	0.40
Mao Mao and Badgerclops learn about "Takesgiving", a holiday where two thieving con artists, a fox named Rufus and a raccoon named Reggie come and take everyone's personal belongings. Mao Mao and Badgerclops set out to prove that the swindlers are up to no good, but Adorabat insists that they cannot be evil because they act nice all the time.
10	10	"Bao Bao's Revenge"	Emily Oetzell and Chris Ybarra	Akira "Mark" Fujita, Michael Moloney, and Parker Simmons	July 29, 2019	MM109	0.38
King Snugglemagne gets a message that Bao Bao, Mao Mao's old partner, is arriving. Mao Mao is convinced that Bao Bao betrayed him and cost him his tail. However, Bao Bao turns out to be a regular dog, with Badgerclops stating that Mao Mao has a tendency to be hyperbolic, and that an actual monster they once faced together is coming to attack the town.
11	11	"Popularity Conquest"	Nathanael H. Jones and Alexandria Kwan	Akira "Mark" Fujita, Michael Moloney, and Parker Simmons	August 5, 2019 (Note: This episode was first released online on August 2, 2019.)	MM115	0.34
King Snugglemagne reveals to Mao Mao that out of the entire sheriff's department, he is the least popular due to his short temper and abrasive personality. In order to become more likable, Mao Mao reinvents his look and tone, but the town soon begins to fall in disarray without his strict rules which starts to concern Adorabat and Badgerclops.
12	12	"Sick Mao"	Emily Oetzell and Chris Ybarra	Akira "Mark" Fujita, Michael Moloney, and Parker Simmons	August 5, 2019	MM117	0.34
Mao Mao suddenly catches a cold that prevents him from being effective at fighting. Despite this, he insists that he is not sick as that would mean that he is weak. Adorabat and Badgerclops try to prevent him from spreading the disease which makes it even more difficult when a giant ice dragon appears to cause destruction in the town.
13	13	"Thumb War"	Emily Oetzell and Chris Ybarra	Akira "Mark" Fujita, Michael Moloney, and Parker Simmons	August 12, 2019	MM112	0.39
The gang decide to compete in the annual Thumb War competition. While Adorabat is having fun, Mao Mao insists that there is no point in having fun if you are just going to lose. Soon Mao Mao begins losing hope in trying when he is forced to give up his gloves and use his actual stubby fingers while also going up against the champion, Big Thumb Pete.
14	14	"All By Mao Self"	Nathanael H. Jones and Alexandria Kwan	Akira "Mark" Fujita, Michael Moloney, and Parker Simmons	August 12, 2019	MM105	0.40
While fighting the Sky Pirates in a junkyard, Mao Mao comes to the realization that he will not be able to achieve legendary status until he makes some changes in his life. To do this, he decides to add weights to his feet and carry scorpions while remaining blindfolded. Orangusnake next tries to convince Mao Mao that he does not need friends to be legendary.
15	15	"He's the Sheriff"	Phil Ahn and Allison Craig	Akira "Mark" Fujita, Michael Moloney, and Parker Simmons	August 19, 2019	MM113	0.34
When King Snugglemagne believes that the sheriff's department is more popular than him, he makes an impromptu day out with them as a volunteer deputy. However, Snugglemagne's constant politeness annoys Mao Mao and the crew and they look for a way to get rid of him. At the last moment, Snugglemagne faces a polite off with Boss Hosstrich.
16	16	"Bobo Chan"	Nora Meek and Griffith Kimmins	Akira "Mark" Fujita, Michael Moloney, and Parker Simmons	August 19, 2019	MM119	0.31
Badgerclops discovers an egg that quickly hatches into a small blue dino-like creature that he names Bobo Chan. While he wants to keep her as his own, Mao Mao insists that he release her back into the wild and Adorabat wants to hunt and kill her. Eventually, Badgerclops releases Bobo Chan into the wild and three months later gets a surprise.
17	17	"Small"	Nathanael H. Jones and Alexandria Kwan	Akira "Mark" Fujita, Michael Moloney, and Parker Simmons	September 7, 2019	MM120	0.43
When Shin Mao, Mao Mao's father, arrives at Pure Heart Valley to visit his son, everyone is put off by his "passive-aggressive" nature. He continuously puts down Mao Mao, despite his heroic endeavors and makes Badgerclops, Adorabat and even Orangusnake uncomfortable. However, Shin Mao changes his tune when Mao Mao is placed in a conflicting position.
18	18	"Legend of the Torbaclaun"	Phil Ahn and Griffith Kimmins	Akira "Mark" Fujita, Michael Moloney, and Parker Simmons	September 7, 2019	MM118	0.38
Adorabat claims that there is a mysterious creature called the Torbaclaun that arrives when the no leaf clover is present. Mao Mao angrily denounces such a creature exists, but all the Sweetypies begin to give in to the obviously fake phenomena. While Badgerclops profits from the event with his flutes, Mao Mao seeks to expose the whole thing as a sham.
19	19	"Meet Tanya Keys"	Nathanael H. Jones and Alexandria Kwan	Akira "Mark" Fujita, Michael Moloney, and Parker Simmons	September 7, 2019	MM121	0.37
Mao Mao is reunited with Tanya Keys, a tanuki bounty hunter and former lover of his. She has come to kidnap Badgerclops and collect his bounty for a past crime he committed. While Mao Mao wants to stick to the law with rescuing his partner, Tanya tries to get him to be more abrasive with how he does things, all the while messing with him.
20	20	"Weapon of Choice"	Angelo Hatgistavrou and Nora Meek	Akira "Mark" Fujita, Michael Moloney, and Parker Simmons	September 7, 2019	MM116	0.33
When Mao Mao reveals the weapons and their abilities that his sisters received, he suddenly begins to feel demoralized that his own sword, Geraldine (which is basically a glorified glow stick), does not seem to be that impressive. Desperate to prove that his sword is worthy of its battle prowess, Mao Mao sets off to show its magnificent worth.
21	21	"The Truth Stinks"	Emily Oetzell and Chris Ybarra	Akira "Mark" Fujita, Michael Moloney, and Parker Simmons	September 14, 2019	MM110	0.53
Badgerclops is convinced that his new purifying crystals keep him clean when in actuality, he has become incredibly stinky. Mao Mao prevents Adorabat from telling him the truth because of his inability to handle criticism. When the two's attempt at giving him a bath fails, they decide to tell him the truth outright, resulting in him becoming difficult.
22	22	"Trading Day"	Phil Ahn and Griffith Kimmins	Akira "Mark" Fujita, Michael Moloney, and Parker Simmons	September 14, 2019	MM122	0.52
Thinking the other has it easier, the Sheriff's department decides to switch places with one another. Mao Mao gets his own robot arm, Badgerclops attends elementary school and Adorabat tries to be the new sheriff. While fun at first, all three begin to have doubts about their respective new positions, made even more difficult when facing a new monster.
23	23	"Head Chef"	Angelo Hatgistavrou and Nora Meek	Akira "Mark" Fujita, Michael Moloney, and Parker Simmons	September 21, 2019 (Note: This episode was first released online on September 13, 2019.)	MM123	0.48
Mao Mao and Badgerclops are cooking geniuses, but their methods are different. Mao Mao views cooking as an art while Badgerclops views it as a science. To settle their differences, they get on King Snugglemagne's cooking show Head Chef to prove who is really the best with Adorabat joining as well, even though she is cooking with plastic food.
24	24	"Orangusnake Begins"	Nathanael H. Jones and Alexandria Kwan	Akira "Mark" Fujita, Michael Moloney, and Parker Simmons	September 21, 2019	MM125	0.40
Mao Mao continues to goad Orangusnake and the Sky Pirates with his constant insults and put downs. In an effort to beat him, Orangusnake combines with his minions to become Bossiraffeosnakurang. When this too fails, they get unexpected help from the energy of the Ruby Pure Heart and become powerful and Mao Mao must learn to not be so demeaning to others.
25	25	"Sugar Berry Fever"	Emily Oetzell and Chris Ybarra	Akira "Mark" Fujita, Michael Moloney, and Parker Simmons	September 28, 2019 (Note: This episode was first released online on September 20, 2019.)	MM124	0.48
Mao Mao lives his life by the hero code, a book that gives him all the information he needs on becoming a true hero. However, there is one rule that he has trouble staying true to: no cobbler. Mao Mao tries to repress his love for the dessert, worrying Badgerclops and Adorabat, but when a monster threatens to steal it, Mao Mao must live by his own truth.
26	26	"Captured Clops"	Phil Ahn and Griffith Kimmins	Akira "Mark" Fujita, Michael Moloney, and Parker Simmons	September 28, 2019	MM126	0.42
When Badgerclops gets upset over having to do many (actually just two) chores, he leaves HQ and finds himself captured by the Sky Pirates. Mao Mao and Adorabat go to rescue him, but refuses to go back to a life of doing chores and agrees to steal the Ruby Pure Heart. However, he soon learns the downsides of having a non-chore filled life.
27	27	"Flyaway"	Angelo Hatgistavrou and Nora Meek	Akira "Mark" Fujita, Michael Moloney, and Parker Simmons	October 5, 2019	MM127	0.38
Adorabat is afraid of going to the dentist, so Mao Mao teaches her about meditation to relax herself. Her spirit leaves her body and she begins to have fun, but also decides to escape so that she will not have to get her tooth fixed. Mao Mao and Badgerclops try to beckon her spirit back while she meets the spirit of Meditatin' Melvin.
28	28	"Baost in Show"	Emily Oetzell and Chris Ybarra	Akira "Mark" Fujita, Michael Moloney, and Parker Simmons	October 5, 2019	MM128	0.35
Bao Bao returns to Pure Heart Valley and is immediately adopted by King Snugglemagne who wants to put in a dog show he is running. Mao Mao is still upset at Bao Bao's "betrayal", but ultimately decides to enter (with Badgerclops as his pet) to rescue Bao Bao. Eventually, Mao Mao and Snugglemagne fight over the right to be Bao Bao's owner.
29	29	"Fright Wig"	Nathanael H. Jones and Alexandria Kwan	Akira "Mark" Fujita, Michael Moloney, and Parker Simmons	October 12, 2019	MM129	0.35
King Snugglemagne has a terrible fright while getting a midnight snack. An emergency call is sent out to the sheriff's department, but when they arrive, Snugglemagne denies any wrongdoing. Mao Mao, Badgerclops, and Adorabat all decide to stay over for the night to discover what scared the king, who is overly determined to not discuss anything with them.
30	30	"Sleeper Sofa"	Phil Ahn and Griffith Kimmins	Akira "Mark" Fujita, Michael Moloney, and Parker Simmons	October 12, 2019	MM130	0.34
An accident causes the sheriff department's couch, Sofia, to get destroyed and Mao Mao orders a new one. Catching on to their plan, the Sky Pirates sneak into the department inside the new couch in an effort to defeat them. However, they end up liking their new surroundings and decide to mooch off of their new benefactors with disastrous results.
31	31	"Mao Mao's Nakey"	Angelo Hatgistavrou and Nora Meek	Akira "Mark" Fujita, Michael Moloney, and Parker Simmons	July 6, 2020 (Note: This episode was first released online on December 13, 2019.)	MM131	0.45
Mao Mao climbs the Ruby Pure Heart to prove his worth. Upon getting to the top however, the strong winds blow his clothes clear off leaving him "nakey". He resolves to use stealth to get to the center of town where his clothes ended up and to "rescue" Adorabat and Badgerclops, who are just back at HQ messing around and waiting for Mao Mao.
32	32	"Lucky Ducky Mug"	Emily Oetzell and Chris Ybarra	Akira "Mark" Fujita, Michael Moloney, and Parker Simmons	July 7, 2020	MM132	0.24
When Adorabat and Badgerclops break Mao Mao's favorite mug, he gives them the silent treatment. So, at a battle, The Sky Pirates become confused as to why they are not talking. Badgerclops tries to give a new mug to Mao Mao, but Mao Mao will not trust them. Adorabat and Badgerclops apologize to Mao Mao for breaking his mug and made a new one.
33	33	"Lonely Kid"	Nathanael H. Jones and Alexandria Kwan	Akira "Mark" Fujita, Michael Moloney, and Parker Simmons	July 8, 2020	MM133	0.26
When Adorabat has trouble making friends at school, Mao Mao tells her the story of how he made his first real friend - Bao Bao. Mao Mao was searching for a friend, instead he met Bao Bao. After the pair defeated the Flimborg, everyone got angry at them and started to chase them, so Mao Mao and Bao Bao became partners through the chase.
34	34	"Try Hard"	Phil Ahn and Griffith Kimmins	Akira "Mark" Fujita, Michael Moloney, and Parker Simmons	July 9, 2020	MM134	0.27
When the Sky Pirates take Mao Mao and Badgerclops hostage, it is up to Adorabat to save the day. Mao Mao wants her to try hard and save them through skill and bravery, but she keeps failing when she tries to rescue them. Eventually, Adorabat is able to save the day by being herself.
35	35	"Scared of Puppets"	Angelo Hatgistavrou and Nora Meek	Akira "Mark" Fujita, Michael Moloney, and Parker Simmons	July 10, 2020	MM135	0.28
Mao Mao is scared of puppets, so Badgerclops tries to scare him, but he keeps failing when Mao Mao pretends to be not scared. Mao Mao a birthday he had when he was a kid. At a Farmer's Market, a Giant Elephant Monster comes to attack them, Mao Mao tries to prove to himself that he's not afraid of puppets anymore.
36	36	"The Perfect Couple"	Danny Ducker and Emily Oetzell	Akira "Mark" Fujita, Michael Moloney, and Parker Simmons	July 13, 2020	MM136	0.31
When Mao Mao accidentally breaks up the most perfect couple in Pure Heart Valley, he has to figure out how to get them back together again. But at the wedding, Orangusnake steals Penny as a wife.
37	37	"Adoradad"	Nathanael H. Jones and Alexandria Kwan	Akira "Mark" Fujita, Michael Moloney, and Parker Simmons	July 14, 2020	MM137	0.31
When Adorabat's dad, Eugene, forbids her from working with the Sheriff's Dept. because it is too dangerous, Adorabat sets out to prove that she can take care of herself. Later, Eugene returns to her childhood home and gets attacked by a Cave Dragon. Adorabat saves him and Eugene realizes that his daughter is big enough to continue to fight evil.
38	38	"Badge-A-Fire Explosion"	Phil Ahn and Griffith Kimmins	Akira "Mark" Fujita, Michael Moloney, and Parker Simmons	July 15, 2020	MM138	0.28
When Badgerclops comes out of a rare state of hyper-focused creativity, he may have made something that could destroy all of Pure Heart Valley. He tells his friends how he likes to make funny inventions, but his parents never liked it, which made him heartbroken.
39	39	"Zing Your Heart Out"	Angelo Hatgistavrou and Nora Meek	Akira "Mark" Fujita, Michael Moloney, and Parker Simmons	July 16, 2020	MM139	0.27
When Adorabat starts to aggressively "heckle" everyone with her new zing power, she threatens the entire kingdom. She thinks her jokes are funny, but she starts to go too far when her zing power starts to hurt people.
40	40	"Strange Bedfellows"	Nathanael H. Jones and Emily Oetzell	Akira "Mark" Fujita, Michael Moloney, and Parker Simmons	July 17, 2020	MM140	0.27
After an insane battle, Mao Mao and Orangusnake end up in the same hospital room. Dr. Cuddlestein wants them to follow her rules, but even in full body casts, the sworn enemies continue the fight, ignoring her policies until they end up in a cement hole.

== Production ==
=== Development ===
Mao Mao: Heroes of Pure Heart was created by Parker Simmons, hired at Titmouse, Inc. in 2009 as an animator, for his first work Black Panther for Black Entertainment Television (BET). In the following years, he was involved in other projects, including Metalocalypse, Superjail!, Black Dynamite, Motorcity, and a couple of animation shorts on the Internet. Following the completion of Turbo Fast, Parker and his colleagues wanted to do their individual work. When someone asked Parker to make a show, he started drawing and putting ideas together. He was concerned with its concept being limited, so he converted it into a short. It was screened in 2014 at the "5 Second Day", an annual Titmouse Inc. event in which its staff were encouraged in creation of own project. Parker voiced Mao Mao, using his low-pitched voice in similar way to how Batman is portrayed in the media. Griffith Kimmins, who worked previously with Parker on Titmouse Inc. projects, voiced Bearclops. (Note: Initially, Badgerclops was a polar bear called "Bearclops". He was changed to be a badger for the series.) And Lika Leong, previously a production coordinator on Turbo Fast, voiced Adorabat. Doug Vito provided sound editing and later served as a series animatic editor. Brian Pak also animated its brief skit, and was later involved as a series board revisionist.

Following screening, the short has received positive feedback from the audience and gained interest from the chief executive officer (CEO) and founder of Titmouse Inc., Chris Prynoski, who saw potential in the project. Parker pitched to him a 7-minute short serving as a pilot that would be sold to a television network. Prynoski agreed with the pitch, providing budget, schedule, and a spare year for the team to expand upon characters and worldbuilding. Parker took inspiration from the media that he grew up with, such as Batman: The Animated Series and Akira Toriyama's Dragon Ball, Dr. Slump, and Chrono Trigger (1995). Alongwith his personal experiences with family and friends. The pilot was pitched in June 2017 to Cartoon Network's CEO, Rob Sorcher, to become a full series. The network green-lighted the project, giving the staff a total of 95 weeks (roughly 22 months) to produce the series for the television release schedule.

=== Animation ===
Animation for Mao Mao: Heroes of Pure Heart was produced by the Los Angeles department of Titmouse, Inc., involving from 40 to 55 people; with the additional support from a Malaysia-based team at animtaion studio, Inspidea. The show was animated in Adobe Animate, with After Effects for the compositing. Each episode took 40 weeks (about 9 months) to be produced, with many developed in parallel. Its production for a single team took 4–5 months for pre-production, (2–3 months for production) and 2 months for post-production.

The staff used tweening for the animation frames and "symbols" (reusable assets) to streamline the process. The latter allowed them to easily create head turns or a variety of mouth shapes for characters. Many shots, backgrounds were either more polished or cut. For many episodes, retakes were made by Parker and other staff artists for quality control of the animation; that was doable due to openess of the respective animation software. Parker later noted that he had done over 50 retakes for a single episode.

=== Music ===
Music for Mao Mao: Heroes of Pure Heart was provided by Mint Potion Studios, a company founded by Jake Kaufman, who also provided a score for the series pilot. Sam Lustig Tommy Pedriniwere and Jake Kaufman were respective composers. Alongwith Robert Altschuler who served as an audio engineer and audio mixer, Brian Burwell as a drummer, while Kyle Tormey performed music for the end credits. The opening theme, "I Love You Mao Mao", Parker provided lyrics, Kaho Kidoguchi was a vocalist, and Tommy Pedrini and Chiyoko Yamasato were backup vocalists. Kidoguchi also served as a lead vocalist for "No More Waiting" in the episode "Lonely Kid".

== Broadcast ==
Mao Mao: Heroes of Pure Heart was announced by Cartoon Network on May 20, 2019, for a full series alongside Tig n' Seek (originally titled Tiggle Winks). The first 8 episodes were released on June 28 on the Cartoon Network app, website, and VOD. The show debuted on Cartoon Network, on July 1, 2019. It also premiered in Nigeria on January 18, 2020 (via GOtv), in Africa on January 27, and in Japan in April 5. The first 30 episodes of the show were added to HBO Max, on September 1, 2020. The last 10 episodes were added on January 1, 2021. The series was later removed from the service in August 2022.

== Reception ==
=== Critical reception ===
Mao Mao: Heroes of Pure Heart was well received by critics. Nick Valdez of ComicBook.com, stated that the show "has the potential to become a massive success for Cartoon Network." Dave Trumbore of Collider, said he'll be "cautiously optimistic with this one. It's got a good start and great heart, it just remains to be seen how much original mythology will make its way into the narrative. Just like Adventure Time, Steven Universe, and OK K.O.! took some time to build up the behind-the-scenes drama, Mao Mao could benefit from a deeper storytelling well in the long run."

Dave praised dynamic between Mao Mao and Badgerclops, describing it as "if a comedic duo like Batman and Robin (think LEGO Batman) landed in Care Bear country". Emily Ashby of Common Sense Media praised the sharp writing and dynamic between the protagonists and their personalities, providing appeal across the generations. She also found the series to be more suitable for tweens than younger kids, due to the intensity of the action scenes.

Retrospectively, Jason Tyler Van Duine of Game Rant, praised the humor as well he considered Mao Mao's character "in every way act the opposite of how a typical kid's show protagonist would. Mao Mao's ego and frustration end up driving much of the conflict, and his contrast with the otherwise innocent setting provides a nice backdrop for its humor". Similarly thought Judy Black of Collider, who considered Heroes of Pure Heart as "a breath of fresh air from childish mediocrity".

=== Awards and nominations ===
Year	Award	Category	Nominee(s)	Episode	Result	Ref.
2019	Annie Awards	Best Production Design Television/Media	Khang Le, Chris Fisher, Gael Bertrand, Deodato Pangandoyon, Howard Chen	N/A	Nominated	
2020	Daytime Emmy Award	Outstanding Performer in an Animated Program	Doug Vito, Todd Raleigh, Jocelyn Barkenhagen, Haley Gansert	N/A	Nominated	
2020	Daytime Emmy Award	Outstanding Editing for an Animated Program	Parker Simmons	N/A	Nominated	
2020	47th Annie Awards	Outstanding Achievement for Production Design in an Animated Television/Broadcast Production	Khang Le, Chris Fisher, Gael Bertrand, Deodato Pangandoyon, Howard Chen	Ultraclops	Nominated	
2021	Daytime Emmy Award	Outstanding Performer in an Animated Program	Parker Simmons as Mao Mao/King Snugglemagne/Slim Pigguns/Guard	N/A	Won	
2021	48th Annie Awards	Outstanding Achievement for Directing in an Animated Television/Media Production	Michael Moloney	Mao Mao's Nakey	Nominated	

== Cancellation ==
A second season was confirmed to be in production at the Cartoon Network Studios First Look Panel during the San Diego Comic-Con at Home event on July 23, 2020; an animatic was shown alongside it. In August 2022, the show was removed from HBO Max as a result of the Warner Bros. Discovery merger. Cartoon Network subsequently removed all references to the show from their official websites, YouTube channels, and Twitter feeds, along with the second season announcement. The series Infinity Train faced a similar fate, with only VOD platforms and digital purchase remaining available to access the series. Due to the long hiatus since the release of its last episode, "Strange Bedfellows", and the series' removal following the merger, fans believed that the series had been quietly cancelled. Simmons was uncertain about the series future, adding "it was unclear to him whether the series was officially canceled or if another season could be made".
