= Ollie Green =

American television producer

- Occupation: Television producer
- Years active: 1996–present

Ollie Green is an American television producer who has worked in production management for adult animated shows. She has won five Primetime Emmy Awards and been nominated for nine more in the categories Outstanding Animated Program and Outstanding Short Form Animated Program for her work on the television programs Robot Chicken and Rick and Morty for Adult Swim.

Green's producing credits include The Eric Andre Show, Superjail!, YOLO: Crystal Fantasy, Black Dynamite, Mr. Pickles (and its spin-off Momma Named Me Sheriff), The Simpsons, Hot Streets, Smiling Friends, Fat Guy Stuck in Internet, The Venture Bros., Ballmastrz: 9009 and Lazor Wulf. Green left Adult Swim in 2023.
