= Scott DaRos =

American animator and director

Scott DaRos is an American animator, artist, and director who has won two Emmy Awards and been nominated for one Emmy and two Annie Awards.

As a character animator, DaRos received a Primetime Emmy Award for Outstanding Individual Achievement in Animation in 2016. As animation director or co-director, he received a Primetime Emmy Award for Outstanding Short Form Animated Program in 2018, and was nominated for a second short in 2019. All three Emmys were for his work on Robot Chicken. He received Annie Award nominations for character animation in 2016 for Elf: Buddy's Musical Christmas and in 2020 for Robot Chicken. He has animated or directed animation on M.O.D.O.K, SuperMansion, SpongeBob SquarePants, Buddy Thunderstruck, Robot Chicken, and other TV shows and shorts.

DaRos received his BFA in studio art from the University of Connecticut in 2007. After working in Los Angeles for ten years, he became a freelance artist at Threadwood, an animation business that he owns and operates together with his wife and 2009 UConn alum, Alexis Deprey. They specialize in stop motion and clay animation.
