= Tig n' Seek =

American animated television series

- Official poster for the series on HBO Max.
- Genre: Comedy; Adventure; Surreal humour
- Created by: Myke Chilian
- Voices of: Myke Chilian; Jemaine Clement; Rich Fulcher; Wanda Sykes; Vatche Panos
- Theme music composer: Tommy Meehan
- Composer: Tommy Meehan
- Country of origin: United States
- Original language: English
- No. of seasons: 4
- No. of episodes: 80 (list of episodes)

Production
- Executive producers: Myke Chilian; Jennifer Pelphrey (S1–2); Tramm Wigzell (S1–2); Rob Sorcher (S1–2); Brian A. Miller (S1–2); Sam Register (S3)
- Producers: Pernelle Hayes; Rossitza Likomanova
- Editor: Bobby Gibis
- Running time: 11 minutes
- Production company: Cartoon Network Studios

Original release
- Network: HBO Max
- Release: July 23, 2020 – May 26, 2022

Tig n' Seek (originally called Tiggle Winks) is an American animated television series created by Myke Chilian for Cartoon Network. Prior to the series, Chilian served as a designer on Rick and Morty as well as a writer and storyboard artist on Uncle Grandpa. The series is produced by Cartoon Network Studios. It was originally set to premiere on Cartoon Network, but was moved to the then-upcoming streaming service, HBO Max. The first season premiered on July 23, 2020, on the streaming service.

The series was renewed for a second season which premiered on March 11, 2021. The series made its linear premiere on Cartoon Network on August 6, 2021, with some episodes aired out of order. The third season was released on September 16, 2021, only six months after the show's second season premiered. The fourth season was released on May 26, 2022.

The show also was the last to feature the voice of Louie Anderson before his death on January 21, 2022.

On August 18, 2022, the series was removed from HBO Max.

== Premise ==
Tig n' Seek follows the adventures of Tiggy, an 8-year-old detective, and his cat Gweeseek as they solve cases and retrieve lost items at the Department of Lost & Found.

== Cast ==
=== Main cast ===
- Myke Chilian as Tiggy, an 8-year-old detective who works for the Department of Lost & Found. He is very energetic and optimistic about his job.
- Jemaine Clement as This Guy, a large, blue, fuzzy monster-like office administrator who is calm and patient.
- Rich Fulcher as Boss, a dog who is the manager of the Department of Lost & Found. Though simple-minded and incompetent, Boss genuinely cares for all of his employees.
- Wanda Sykes as Nuritza, a tough and no-nonsense rabbit who works as a maintenance officer at the Department of the Lost and Found.
- Vatche Panos as Prangle Penguin, a socially awkward penguin who always wears his strawberry hat.
- Kari Wahlgren as Gweeseek (pilot), a cat who is Tiggy's owner and business partner. She is much smarter than Tiggy and lowers her goggles of manufacturing gadgets for everyday objects.

=== Supporting cast ===
- Maryann Strossner as Mrs. Grendelsons, a elderly woman
- Vartui Rosie Chilian as Rosie Penguin, Prangle's mother
- Grey DeLisle as Carla Tetrazzini
- Louie Anderson as Chester
- Kayla Melikian as Skippy
- John O'Hurley as Chief
- Natalie Palamides as Puppeteer / Alligator Al / Security guard puppet
- Lo Mutuc (Note: credited as Charlyne Yi) as Georgia
- Eric Bauza as Danny Icicles / himself
- Nicole Byer as Dr. Thompson
- Kirby as Octavia Spritz
- Rob Schrab as Braunt Stevens
- Sam Richardson as President

=== Guest stars ===
- Kate Freund as Linda Buckles
- James Adomian as H. G. Fluffenfold
- Sam Jay as Captain Delilah
- David Wain as Jason Mezner
- Sam Brown as Churro Vendor
- Les Claypool as Farmer Gus
- Kevin McDonald as Gov / Old Crocheter
- Bill Moseley as Gus
- Aparna Nancherla as Amritha
- Kimmy Robertson as Betty
- Sarah Sherman as Arcade Employee
- Keith David as Mr. Martin
- Zach Hadel as Darryl Barryl

== Episodes ==
Season	Episodes	Originally released
Pilot		November 24, 2017
1	20	July 23, 2020
2	20	March 11, 2021
3	20	September 16, 2021
4	20	May 26, 2022

== Production ==
The show was originally part of the Cartoon Network Shorts Program in 2015, before being greenlight for a series in May 2019, alongside Mao Mao: Heroes of Pure Heart.

On August 18, 2022, the series was removed from HBO Max. The show was also removed from digital purchase in October 2023.

=== Animation ===
Rough Draft Studios had handled most of the animation for the series, which is done through traditional animation techniques at the studio in Seoul, South Korea.

== International broadcast ==
In Canada, the series premiered on Teletoon on November 8, 2020.
