= We Bare Bears =

American animated television series

- Genre: Animated sitcom; Slice of life; Adventure; Comedy
- Created by: Daniel Chong
- Based on: The Three Bare Bears by Daniel Chong
- Directed by: Manny Hernandez
- Creative director: Eddie Sassen
- Voices of: Eric Edelstein; Bobby Moynihan; Demetri Martin; Lo Mutuc (Note: Credited as Charlyne Yi); Jason Lee; Cameron Esposito
- Theme music composer: Ivan Barias
- Opening theme: "We'll Be There" by Estelle
- Composer: Brad Breeck
- Country of origin: United States
- Original language: English
- No. of seasons: 4
- No. of episodes: 140 (list of episodes)

Production
- Executive producers: Daniel Chong; Curtis Lelash; Jennifer Pelphrey; Brian A. Miller; Rob Sorcher
- Producer: Carrie Wilksen
- Animators: Saerom Animation; Rough Draft Studios
- Running time: 11 minutes; 22 minutes (specials)
- Production company: Cartoon Network Studios

Original release
- Network: Cartoon Network
- Release: July 27, 2015 – May 27, 2019

Related
- We Bare Bears: The Movie; We Baby Bears

We Bare Bears is an American animated sitcom created by Daniel Chong for Cartoon Network. The show follows three bear brothers, named Grizzly, Panda and Ice Bear, and their awkward attempts at integrating with the human world in the San Francisco Bay Area.

The series was based on Chong's webcomic The Three Bare Bears, and the pilot episode made its world premiere at the KLIK! Amsterdam Animation Festival, where it won in the Young Amsterdam Audience category.

The show premiered on July 27, 2015, and ended on May 27, 2019, running for four seasons and a total of 140 episodes and 15 shorts.

A film adaptation, We Bare Bears: The Movie, was released digitally on June 30, 2020, and later aired on Cartoon Network on September 7; it served as a conclusion to the narrative of the series. A spin-off prequel series titled We Baby Bears, focusing on the Three Bears when they were cubs, premiered on January 1, 2022.

== Plot ==
We Bare Bears follows three anthropomorphic adoptive brother Bears: boisterous and adventurous Grizzly (Eric Edelstein), insecure and nervous Panda (Bobby Moynihan), and monotonous and stoic Ice Bear (Demetri Martin). The Bears attempt to integrate with human society, such as by purchasing food, making human companions, or trying to become famous on the Internet, although these attempts see the Bears struggle to do so due to the civilized nature of humans and their own non-human instincts. In the end, however, they figure out that they have each other for support.

The Bears often form a "bear stack", which they use to get around the city, and has become perhaps the most recognizable image from the series. Occasionally, the Bears share adventures with their friends, such as child prodigy Chloe Park (Lo Mutuc), bigfoot Charlie (Jason Lee), the Bears' rival and internet sensation koala Nom Nom (Patton Oswalt), park ranger Tabes (Cameron Esposito), produce saleswoman Lucy (Ellie Kemper), and a girl-scout ranger team Poppy Rangers featuring Wallace (Cate Gragnani), Nguyen (Audrey Huynh), Murphy (Stella Balick-Karrer), Parker (Danity Harris) and Diaz (Marissa Soto). Some flashback episodes chronicle the adventures of the Bears as cubs trying to find a home.

== Episodes ==
Season	Episodes		Originally released	
Season	Episodes		First released	Last released
Pilot			May 21, 2014	
Shorts	15	5	July 6, 2015	December 1, 2015
Shorts	15	5	June 30, 2016	
Shorts	15	5	April 27, 2017	
1	26		July 27, 2015	February 11, 2016
2	26		February 25, 2016	April 11, 2017
3	44		April 3, 2017	February 16, 2018
4	44		July 30, 2018	May 27, 2019
Film			June 30, 2020	

== Production ==
(From top to bottom) Grizzly, Panda and Ice Bear forming their "bear stack".

The show was created by cartoonist Daniel Chong, who had previously worked as a story artist for Pixar and Illumination Entertainment. The show is based on his webcomic The Three Bare Bears, which features the same characters. This webcomic was uploaded online from 2010 to 2011, running for ten strips. Chong has said he first drew the Bears, including drawing them in a stack, in an attempt to make his girlfriend's niece laugh. Chong also said that, after a different pilot he was working on did not get picked up, he wanted to pitch something else, "and this was just the closest thing near me!" Chong said that doing the comic helped a lot with the show, especially in providing the dynamic between the three main characters, though the characters have also evolved a lot from the comic.

Billed as a comedy, the show is a production of Cartoon Network Studios, which developed the program with Chong as part of their shorts development program. It was announced during the network's 2014 upfront. According to Chong, much of the pilot was done with traditional watercolors, then digitally altered, to give "a naturalistic feel", but traditional work was not possible for a full show so he and the art director found a digital way to produce a "painterly feel", using references such as Peanuts, children's book illustrators like Tomi Ungerer and E. H. Shepard, and The Many Adventures of Winnie the Pooh.

Nom Nom and Charlie were initially voiced by Ken Jeong and Tom Arnold, respectively, before getting recast sometime before airing. Episodes, other than specials and shorts, were 11 minutes long.

== Broadcast ==
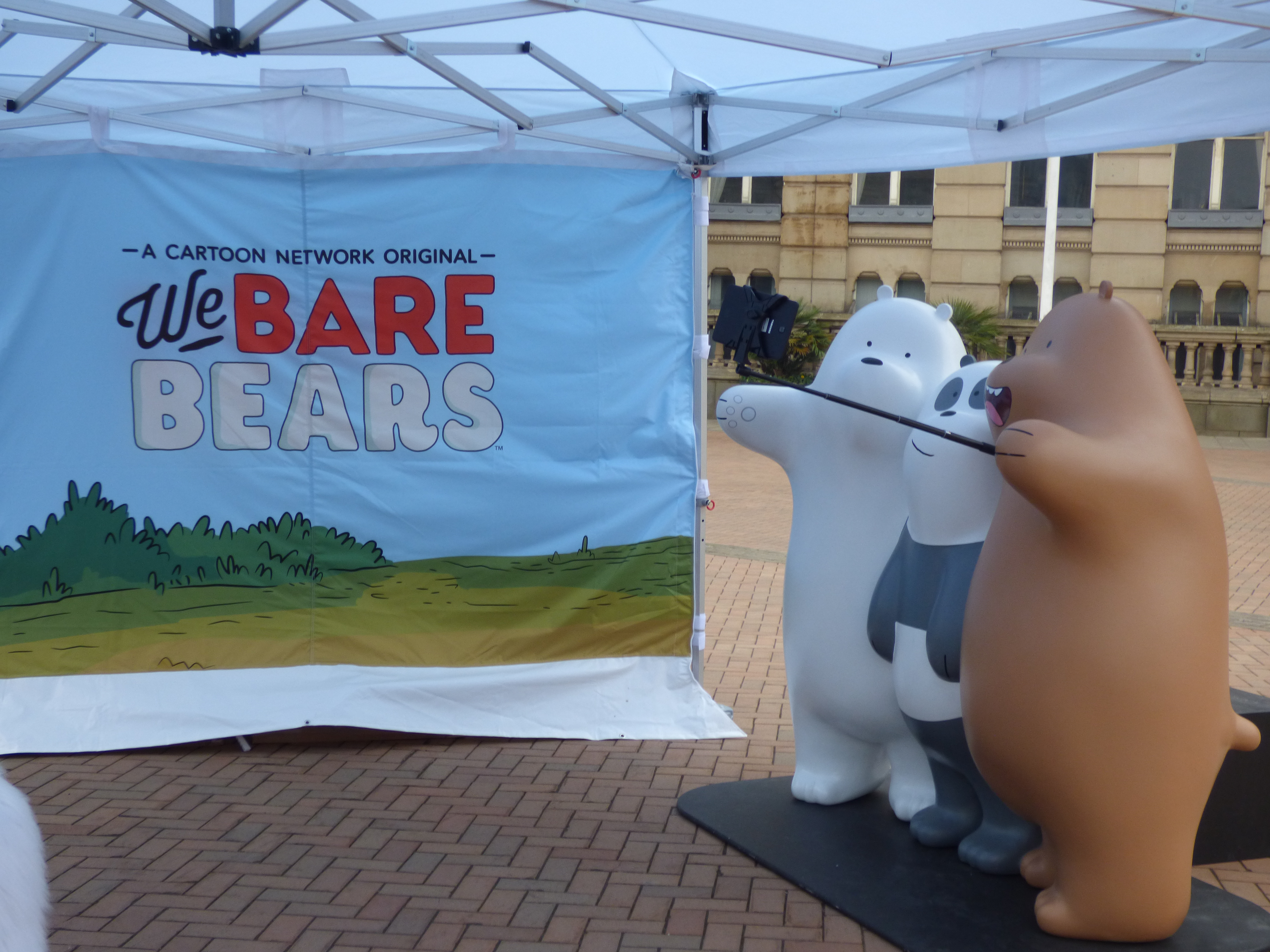
We Bare Bears promotional event at Victoria Square, Birmingham

The pilot episode made its world premiere at the KLIK! Amsterdam Animation Festival at the EYE Film Institute Netherlands in 2014. The short won the KLIK! Young Amsterdam Audience Award.

We Bare Bears premiered on Cartoon Network in the United States and Canada on July 27, 2015.

== Home media ==
Home media releases of We Bare Bears are distributed by Warner Bros. Home Entertainment.

Region	Title	Season(s)	Episodes	Running time (minutes)	Release date
1	Viral Video	1	12 ("Our Stuff" – "Panda's Date" • "Burrito" • "Jean Jacket" • "Shush Ninjas" – "Charlie" • "Occupy Bears" • "The Road")	132	October 4, 2016
1	We Bare Bears: The Movie	n/a	n/a	69	September 8, 2020
2	Series One	1	12 ("Our Stuff" – "My Clique")	132	October 7, 2019
4	Season 1	1	26	286	June 9, 2017
4	Seasons 1-3	1–3	96	1,056	February 14, 2019
4	Season 4	4	44	484	October 6, 2021
4	We Bare Bears: The Movie	n/a	n/a	69	October 6, 2021

== Reception ==
=== Critical reception ===
We Bare Bears has received generally positive reviews from critics. The pilot was described by the EYE Film Institute Netherlands as "hilarious and endearing", and it won in the "Young Amsterdam Audience" category. The show was praised by Mashable for tackling "modern millennial anxieties" and for representing racial minorities; Mashable called the show "a parable about the charms and perils of an increasingly connected society". Emily Ashby of Common Sense Media described the show "a funny and heartwarming story" that "sometimes poke gentle fun at hallmarks of modern society". It said that "what stands out is how the characters' uniqueness serves them well as a group" and considered it suitable for ages 8 and up. Alison de Souza, writing in The Straits Times, noted that We Bare Bears has appealed to adults as well, and said that the series stands out "because it juxtaposes a somewhat mature sense of humour with a visual style that recalls the hand-drawn illustrations from children's books."

According to Chong, fans responded positively to the human communities being ethnically diverse. The Asian-American news site NextShark said that the show had gained popularity among Asian American communities because it "contains deeper messages of representation and belonging as a minority – something most Asian American children are far too familiar with." It noted that the show "unapologetically showcases and simultaneously normalizes Asian culture through their references to Panda's love for K-pop and K-dramas, the Bears' regular trips to their favorite boba shop, and Ice Bear's impressive ability to speak fluent Korean and cook traditional Korean dishes."

Kevin Johnson of The A.V. Club was more mixed, saying in 2015 that the show "bounc[ed] between the extraordinary and the endearing," describing typical episodes as the bears "find[ing] themselves in some sort of bizarre yet generic conflict...with little background music, a more muted color palette, and a simpler vibe." Overall, Johnson said it was "not a must-watch show by any means, but it's charming and breezy enough to enjoy within its brief run-time."

Den of Geek's Shamus Kelley noted that the show embraced episodic storytelling, contrary to 90s and 2000s trends in kids' television, and felt that it "uses episodic storytelling to its full advantage and crafts adventures that are perfectly suited to the format." It noted that the show did have some light elements of serialization, including character growth. Helen Armitage of Screen Rant said that the show was known for its 1990s pop culture references, such as depicting Charles Barkley magically appearing from a trading card.

=== Ratings ===
The first episode of We Bare Bears had 2.05 million views on its first showing. Ratings generally fell with time, with the final episode receiving 0.45 million viewers. The first season topped US TV ratings for children aged 2–11 in July 2015.

=== Awards and nominations ===
Year	Award	Category	Nominee	Result	Ref.
2016	Annie Awards	Outstanding Achievement, Storyboarding in an Animated TV/Broadcast Production	Madeline Sharafian, Manny Hernandez, and Bert Youn (for "Burrito")	Nominated	
2016	BAFTA Children's Awards	International	Daniel Chong, Manny Hernandez, Carrie Wilksen	Won	
2017	17th Kidscreen Awards	Best Animated Series	We Bare Bears	Won	
2017	17th Kidscreen Awards	Best Writing	We Bare Bears	Won	
2017	24th International Trickfilm Festival Stuttgart	Best International Animation Series For Kids	We Bare Bears	Won	
2017	Kids' Choice Awards Mexico	Favorite Cartoon	We Bare Bears	Nominated	
2018	Annie Awards	Best Animated Television/Broadcast Production For Children	"Episode: Panda's Art"	Won	
2018	Annecy Festival	Jury Award for a TV Series	"Episode: Panda's Art"	Won	
2018	Prix Jeunesse International Festival and Competition	Best Fictional Show for 11- to 15-year-olds	We Bare Bears	Nominated	
2018	70th Primetime Creative Arts Emmy Awards	Outstanding Short Form Animated Program	"Hurricane Hal"	Nominated	
2019	Annie Awards	Outstanding Achievement for Writing in an Animated Television / Broadcast Production	"Hurricane Hal"	Nominated	

== Book adaptations ==
Penguin Random House announced in 2014 that it would publish books based on various programs for Cartoon Network, including We Bare Bears. The books were produced out of the company's Cartoon Network Books imprint, a division of the Penguin Young Readers Group, and is based on a partnership with the network that started in 2013. Books based on We Bare Bears are:

- Bears: Awesome at Everything by Christa Roberts (2017)
- We Bare Bears: We Go Everywhere Handbook by Molly Reisner (2017)
- We Bare Bears Mad Libs by Hannah S. Campbell (2017)

== Film adaptation ==
On May 30, 2019, Cartoon Network announced that We Bare Bears: The Movie would be released in mid-2020. On May 21, 2020, the film was announced to be released digitally on June 30, 2020, and on Cartoon Network on September 7, 2020; it served as a conclusion to the narrative of the series. The movie was directed by series creator Daniel Chong and features the main and supporting voice actors reprising their respective roles from the TV series. The plot follows the Three Bear brothers Grizzly, Panda, and Ice Bear having to flee a wildlife control agent by leaving the Bay Area and seeking refuge to Canada. Along the way, the Bears endure hardships while staying true to their promise of being "bros for life".

Covering the film for SF Weekly, Grace Li summarized the film as "sweet and fun" and a perfect summation for four seasons of adventures. Though expressing regret over the series' unresolved story lines, she complimented its zany sense of humor and its ultimate message, which to her was that "you can always choose your family". Shamus Kelley of Den of Geek gave the film a five out-of five star rating and praised it as an excellent film; one that feels relevant without losing the fun that made the show a fan favorite. He commended the relationship of its main characters, whose fight against intolerance he said infuses every moment of the film with more power and relevance than any other story the show has done before. Rollin Bishop of ComicBook.com awarded the film a four out of five-star rating. Though describing it as poorly paced, he praised its decision to include the heavy themes, which were exacerbated by current events.

== Spin-off ==
A prequel spin-off series titled We Baby Bears was announced on May 30, 2019, which was slated to premiere on Cartoon Network in spring 2021 but was delayed to January 2022. The show focuses on the Three Bears when they were cubs. The series is rendered in an anime-esque style and featured the Bears going on various adventures in their magic box. Manny Hernandez, who served as supervising director on the previous series, serves as the showrunner while Daniel Chong is involved as an executive producer. A trailer was released on November 25, 2021. The series stars Connor Andrade as Baby Grizz, Amari McCoy as Baby Panda and Max Mitchell as Baby Ice Bear, and premiered on January 1, 2022. Demetri Martin, the voice of Adult Ice Bear on the parent series provides the narration for the spin-off.
