= Rob Sorcher =

American television producer

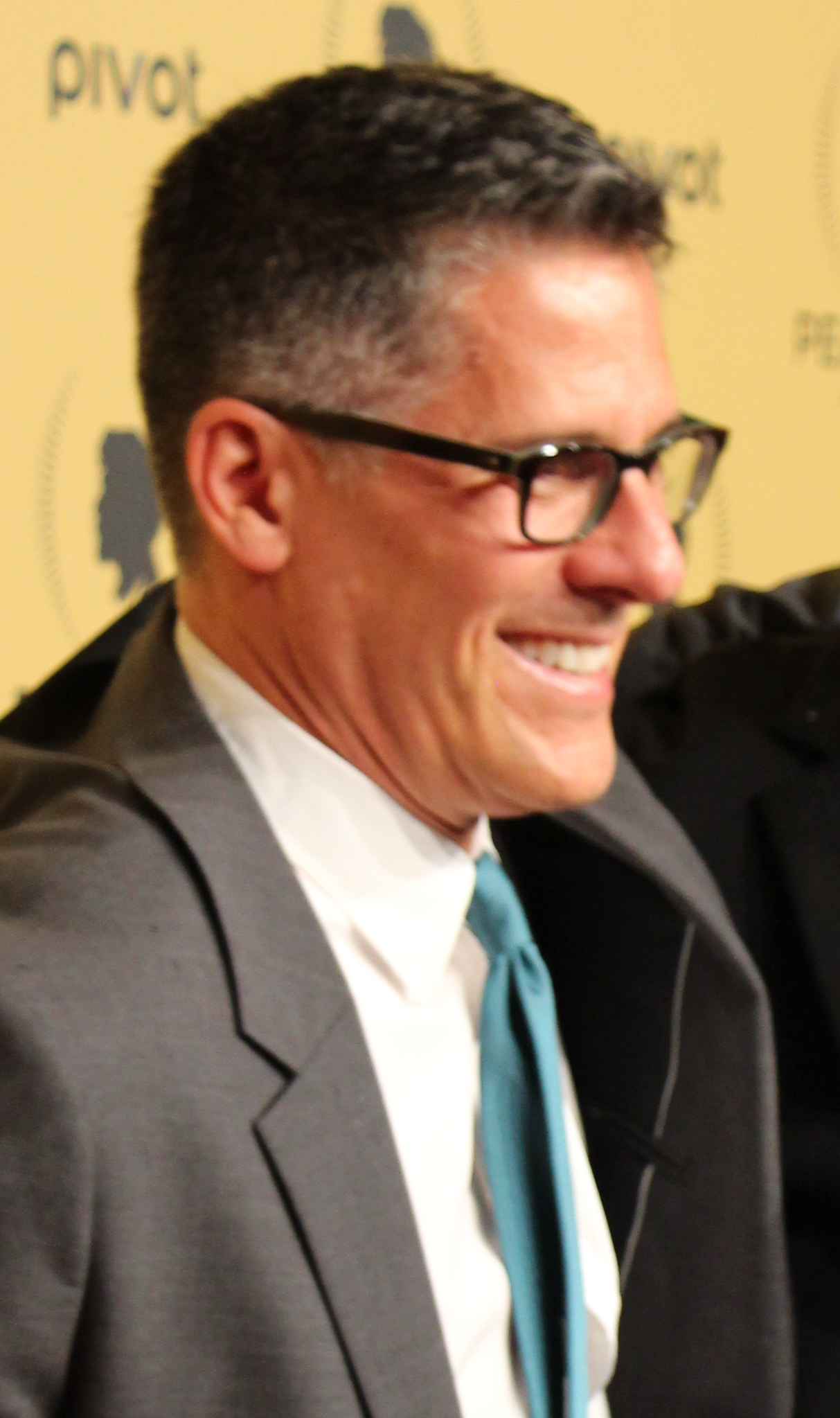
- Sorcher at the 2015 Peabody Awards for Adventure Time
- Born: Robert Sorcher; December 22, 1961 (age 64)
- Occupation: Television producer

Robert Sorcher (born December 22, 1961) is an American television producer for Warner Bros. Television Group. Sorcher was formerly executive vice president of The Cartoon Network, Inc. from 2008 to 2021, and promoted to chief content officer in 2013. He was a producer for We Bare Bears, Adventure Time, Clarence, Regular Show, Steven Universe, Over the Garden Wall, The Powerpuff Girls and Ben 10. As chief content officer, he was in charge of original content development for Cartoon Network and Cartoon Network Studios. Sorcher previously worked at AMC Network where he introduced scripted originals to the channel, including award-winning series Broken Trail, Mad Men and Breaking Bad.

== Career ==
Rob Sorcher oversaw Cartoon Network Studios in Los Angeles, where he executive produced content for worldwide distribution to 192 countries and 370 million homes. He managed all content, which in the past included series like Steven Universe and Adventure Time, CN Games and the flagship CN app.

Sorcher's career worked with several advertisement companies such as Grey Advertising, Griffin-Bacal, and Benton & Bowles.

He also worked for AMC Network as its executive vice president of programming and production. He was credited with leading the network to tremendous growth, thanks to his introduction of scripted originals and Emmy-award winning series such as Mad Men and Breaking Bad, which were both named by the New York Times among the 20 best TV dramas since The Sopranos, and the mini-series Broken Trail.

Prior to AMC, Sorcher was EVP and GM of USA Network for a short time prior to the sudden appointment of Doug Herzog.

Sorcher had also served as EVP of Programming/Production at Fox Family Channel, and earlier in his career worked as the first general manager of Cartoon Network with the creation of his The Cartoonstitute variety project. He moved to start his own production company.

== Selected credits ==
=== Television series – executive producer ===
Year(s)	Title
2020–2021	The Fungies!
2020–2021	Tig n' Seek
2020–2021	Close Enough
2020–2021	Adventure Time: Distant Lands
2019–2020	Steven Universe Future
2019–2021	Primal
2019–2021	Infinity Train
2019–2020	Mao Mao: Heroes of Pure Heart
2019–2021	Victor and Valentino
2018–2021	Summer Camp Island
2018–present	DIY
2018–2021	Craig of the Creek
2018–2021	Apple & Onion
2017–2019	OK K.O.! Let's Be Heroes
2017	Samurai Jack
2016–2021	Ben 10
2016–2019	Mighty Magiswords
2016–2019	The Powerpuff Girls
2015	Long Live the Royals
2015–2019	We Bare Bears
2014	Over the Garden Wall
2014–2018	Clarence
2014–2016	Mixels
2013–2019	Steven Universe
2013–2017	Uncle Grandpa
2013	Incredible Crew
2012–2014	Ben 10: Omniverse
2012–2013	Level Up
2011–2012	Secret Mountain Fort Awesome
2011–2013	The Problem Solverz
2010–2011	Robotomy
2010–2011	Sym-Bionic Titan
2010	Tower Prep
2010–2017	Regular Show
2010	The Cartoonstitute
2010–2013	Generator Rex
2010–2012	Ben 10: Ultimate Alien
2010–2018	Adventure Time

=== Other programs – executive producer ===
Year(s)	Title
2016	Good Jubies
2014	The Powerpuff Girls: Dance Pantsed
2013–2020	Cartoon Network Shorts Department
2013	Stop Bullying: Speak Up – Special
2011	Level Up
2011–2014	Hall of Game Awards

=== Primetime Emmy awards ===
Year	Award	Nominated work	Result
2018	Outstanding Short-Format Animated Program	Adventure Time	Nominated
2018	Outstanding Short-Format Animated Program	Steven Universe	Nominated
2018	Outstanding Short-Format Animated Program	We Bare Bears	Nominated
2017	Outstanding Short-Format Animated Program	Adventure Time	Won
2017	Outstanding Short-Format Animated Program	Steven Universe	Nominated
2016	Outstanding Short-Format Animated Program	Adventure Time	Nominated
2016	Outstanding Short-Format Animated Program	Steven Universe	Nominated
2016	Outstanding Short-Format Animated Program	The Powerpuff Girls	Nominated
2015	Outstanding Short-Format Animated Program	Regular Show	Nominated
2015	Outstanding Short-Format Animated Program	Steven Universe	Nominated
2015	Outstanding Short-Format Animated Program	Adventure Time	Won
2015	Primetime Emmy Award for Outstanding Animated Program	Over the Garden Wall	Won
2014	Outstanding Short-Format Animated Program	Adventure Time	Nominated
2014	Outstanding Short-Format Animated Program	Regular Show	Nominated
2012	Outstanding Short-Format Animated Program	Adventure Time	Nominated
2012	Outstanding Short-Format Animated Program	Regular Show	Won
2011	Outstanding Short-Format Animated Program	Adventure Time	Nominated
2011	Outstanding Short-Format Animated Program	Regular Show	Nominated
2010	Outstanding Short-Format Animated Program	Uncle Grandpa	Nominated
2010	Outstanding Short-Format Animated Program	Adventure Time	Nominated

=== Other awards ===
Year	Award	Nominated work	Result
2019	Peabody Award	Steven Universe	Won
2019	GLAAD Media Award	Steven Universe	Won
2016	BAFTA Awards	We Bare Bears	Won
