= Andrew Ruhemann =

British film producer and director (born 1962)

Andrew Ruhemann (born July 1962) is a film producer, director and the founder of Passion Pictures, an independent production company.

== History ==
Ruhemann was educated at Highgate School and studied French and Drama at Bristol University. He started his career at the Richard Williams’ Animation Studio in London in the mid 1980s, where he was a trainee producer. Within a few months he became managing director, during which time he became responsible for overseeing animation production on the feature film Who Framed Roger Rabbit, directed by Robert Zemeckis.

In 2010 Andrew made his directorial debut with an animated short entitled The Lost Thing, which he co-directed with Shaun Tan, the Australian author of the book from which the film was adapted. The Lost Thing was produced in association with Screen Australia. The film won an Academy Award for Best Short Animation in 2011, in addition to many other awards at film festivals worldwide.

== Filmography ==
- A Life Less Ordinary 1997 (executive producer: animation)
- BBC Future Generations 1998 (TV short) (animator)
- One Day in September 1999 (documentary) (associate producer)
- The Dog Who Was a Cat Inside 2002 (TV short) (executive producer)
- Gorillaz: Phase One - Celebrity Take Down 2002 (video documentary) (executive producer - segment "Clint Eastwood")
- Peace One Day 2004 (documentary) (executive producer)
- Lila Says 2004 (executive producer)
- City Paradise 2004 (short) (executive producer)
- Black Sun 2005 (documentary) (executive producer)
- Once in a Lifetime: The Extraordinary Story of the New York Cosmos 2006 (documentary) (executive producer)
- Crossing the Line 2006 (documentary) (executive producer)
- After the Rain 2006 (short) (executive producer)
- My Kid Could Paint That 2007 (documentary) (co-executive producer)
- The Adventures of One eskimO 2008 (video short) (executive producer)
- The Flapping Track 2008 (TV documentary) (executive producer)
- The John Akii Bua Story: An African Tragedy 2008 (documentary) (executive producer)
- Sergio 2009 (documentary) (executive producer)
- The Age of Stupid 2009 (documentary) (co-executive producer)
- The Tillman Story 2010 (documentary) (executive producer)
- Stones in Exile 2010 (documentary) (co-executive producer: Passion Pictures)
- Fire in Babylon 2010 (documentary) (co-executive producer)
- The Lost Thing 2010 (short) (co-director)
- Project Nim 2011 (documentary) (executive producer)
- Searching for Sugar Man 2012 (documentary) (executive producer)
- How I Live Now 2013 (producer) (post-production)
- Captivated: The Trials of Pamela Smart 2014 (documentary) (executive producer)
- I Am Ali 2014 (documentary) (executive producer)
- Chuck Norris vs. Communism 2015 (documentary) (executive producer)
- Listen to Me Marlon 2015 (documentary) (executive producer)
- Jaco 2015 (documentary) (executive producer)
- Hadwin's Judgement 2015 (documentary) (executive producer)
- Winter on Fire: Ukraine's Fight For Freedom 2015 (documentary) (executive producer)
- The Sunshine Makers 2015 (documentary) (executive producer)
- Pray for Ukraine 2015 (documentary) (executive producer)
- Rocket & Groot 2017 (TV mini-series) (executive producer)
- The Final Year 2017 (documentary) (co-executive producer)
- Spiral 2017 (documentary) (executive producer)
- My Africa 2018 (short documentary) (executive producer)
- Mystify: Michael Hutchence 2019 (documentary) (executive producer)
- Citizen K 2019 (documentarty) (executive producer)
- Andy Murray: Resurfacing 2019 (documentary) (executive producer)
- Rising Phoenix 2020 (documentary) (executive producer)
- Final Account 2020 (documentary) (executive producer)
- Belushi 2020 (documentary) (executive producer)
- Love, Death & Robots (TV series) (executive producer)
- Lady Boss: The Jackie Collins Story 2021 (documentary) (executive producer)
- The Rescue 2021 (documentary) (executive producer)
- Imagine 2003- (TV series) (Executive Producer) (1 episode)
- Merkel 2022 (documentary) (executive producer)
- Anastasia 2022 (short documentary) (executive producer)
- FIFA Uncovered 2022 (TV mini series) (executive producer)
- The Masked Scammer 2022 (documentary) (executive producer)
- Caught Out: Crime. Corruption. Cricket 2023 (documentary) (executive producer)
- AP Dhillon: First of a Kind 2023 (TV mini series) (executive producer)
- Wilding 2023 (documentary) (executive producer)
- The Day I Became a Bird 2023 (animated short) (director) (executive producer)
