= Zacchini =

Zacchini is an Italian surname. Notable people with the surname include:

- Edmondo Zacchini (1894–1981), American circus performer
- Hugo Zacchini (1898–1975), American circus performer
- Ildebrando Zacchini (1868–1948), Maltese-born American painter, inventor and travelling circus owner
- Rene A. Zacchini (1930–2010), French-American politician

== See also ==
- Zacchini v. Scripps-Howard Broadcasting Co., a United States Supreme Court case
