= Edmondo Zacchini =

Edmondo Zacchini (27 March 1894 – 3 October 1981) was a circus entertainer credited with inventing the human cannonball act as one of the Zacchini Brothers.

== Early life ==
Edmondo Zacchini was the oldest son of Ildebrando Zacchini, an Italian portrait artist and amateur gymnast, and brother of Hugo Zacchini. Ildebrando brought his family up in a traveling circus. The family eventually formed their own circus, and Edmondo became a gifted clown, as well as doing acrobatics.

== Pagnotta ==
During World War I, when food was hard to come by, Edmondo was walking through town when he was recognized by a townsman. The man had enjoyed the act so much, that he gave Edmondo his pagnotta, a small loaf of bread that was, at the time, rationed by the bakery to one loaf per person. Others came up, and each gave him their bread in appreciation for the act. From then on, when the townspeople saw him, they would say "There goes Pagnotta". Edmondo adopted it as his stage name. With this name, he became the most famous clown in Italy in the 1920s.

== Human Cannonball ==
He developed his first human cannonball act in Cairo in 1922. This cannon was a crude spring-powered contraption that hurled him 20 feet. The result of his first attempt was a broken leg. He re-designed the device in a hospital in Cairo. Later successful versions used compressed air.

Zacchini and his brother Vittorio were invited to the United States in 1930 by a circus promoter. The family, consisting of six brothers and two sisters, eventually settled in Florida, becoming citizens of the United States.

== Death ==
Zacchini died in a hospital at the age of 87. He is buried in a mausoleum in the Showman's Rest Cemetery, Tampa, Florida.
