= Geauga County Fair =

Annual county fair held in Burton, Ohio, U.S.

Coordinates: 41°28′38″N 81°08′26″W

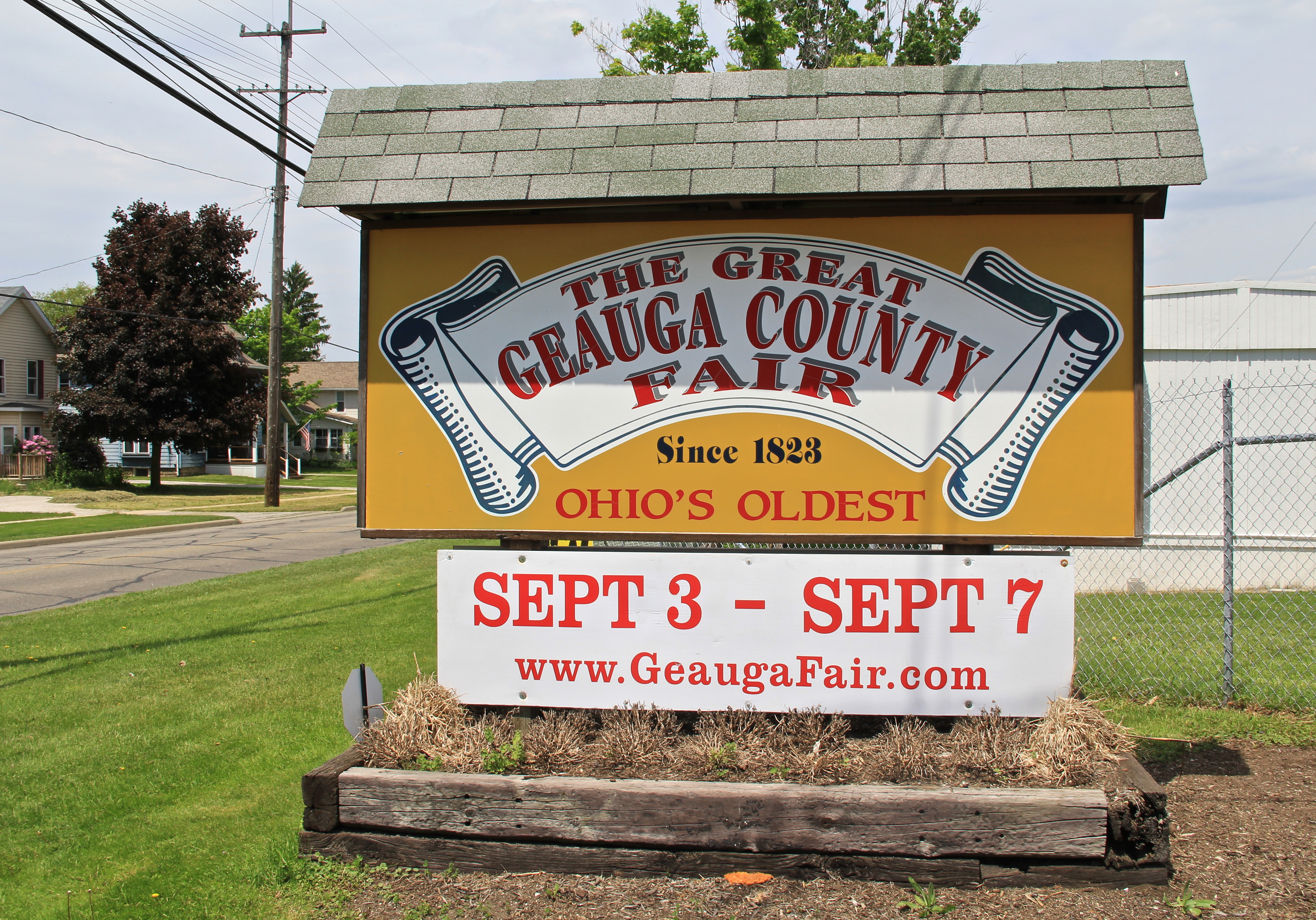
Entrance sign in 2015

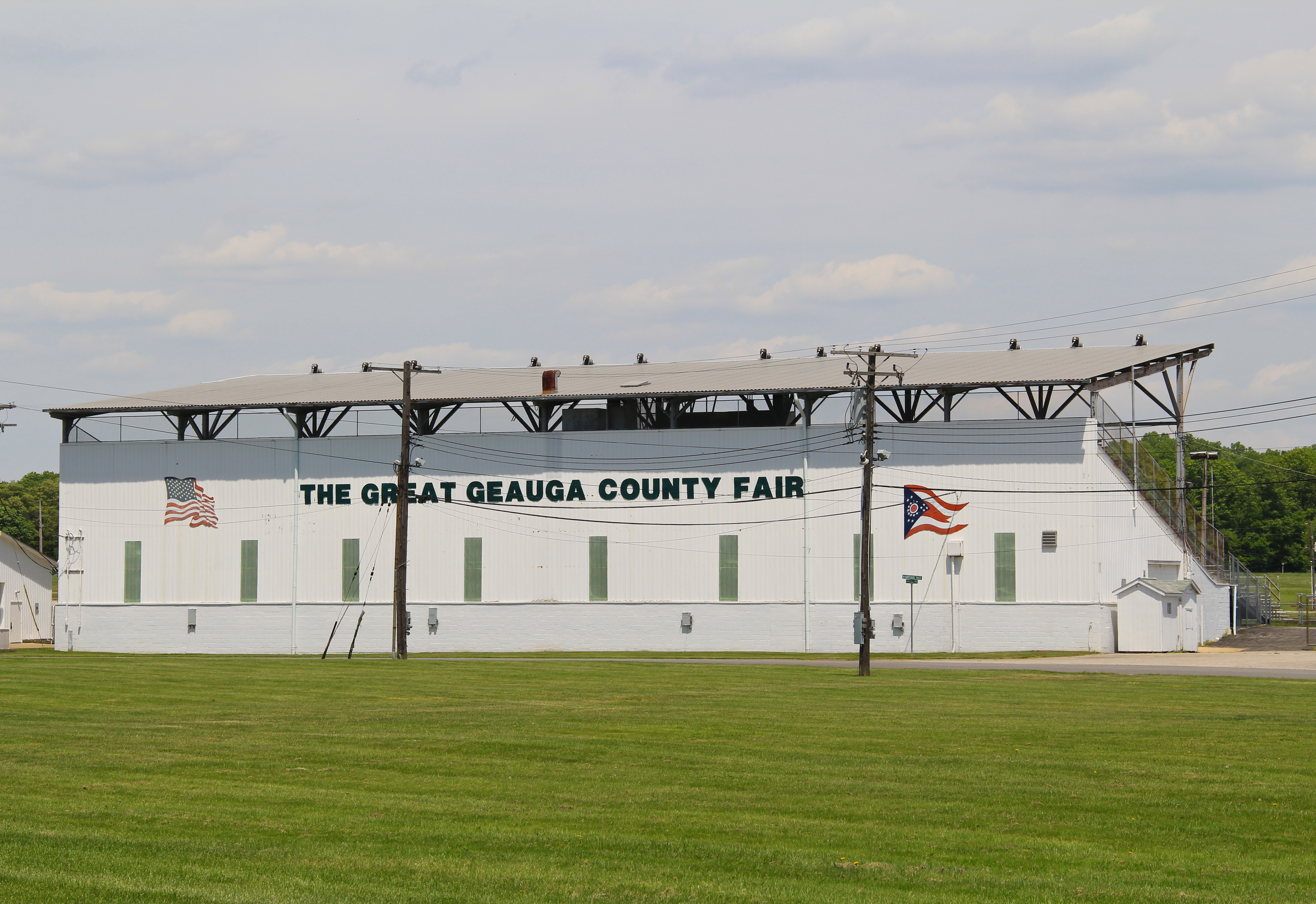
The Great Geauga County Fair grandstands

The Great Geauga County Fair is Ohio's oldest continuous county fair and home to one of the oldest existing agricultural societies in America. It is held annually in Burton, Ohio, every Labor Day weekend as a "grand finale" to the summer. It has been around for 203 years, and each year nearly a quarter of a million people of all ages come to enjoy the more than 12,000 exhibits, animals, rides, food, music, entertainment and special attractions which are featured, as billed in the Fair's motto "Something for Everyone Since 1823".

Geauga County Fair

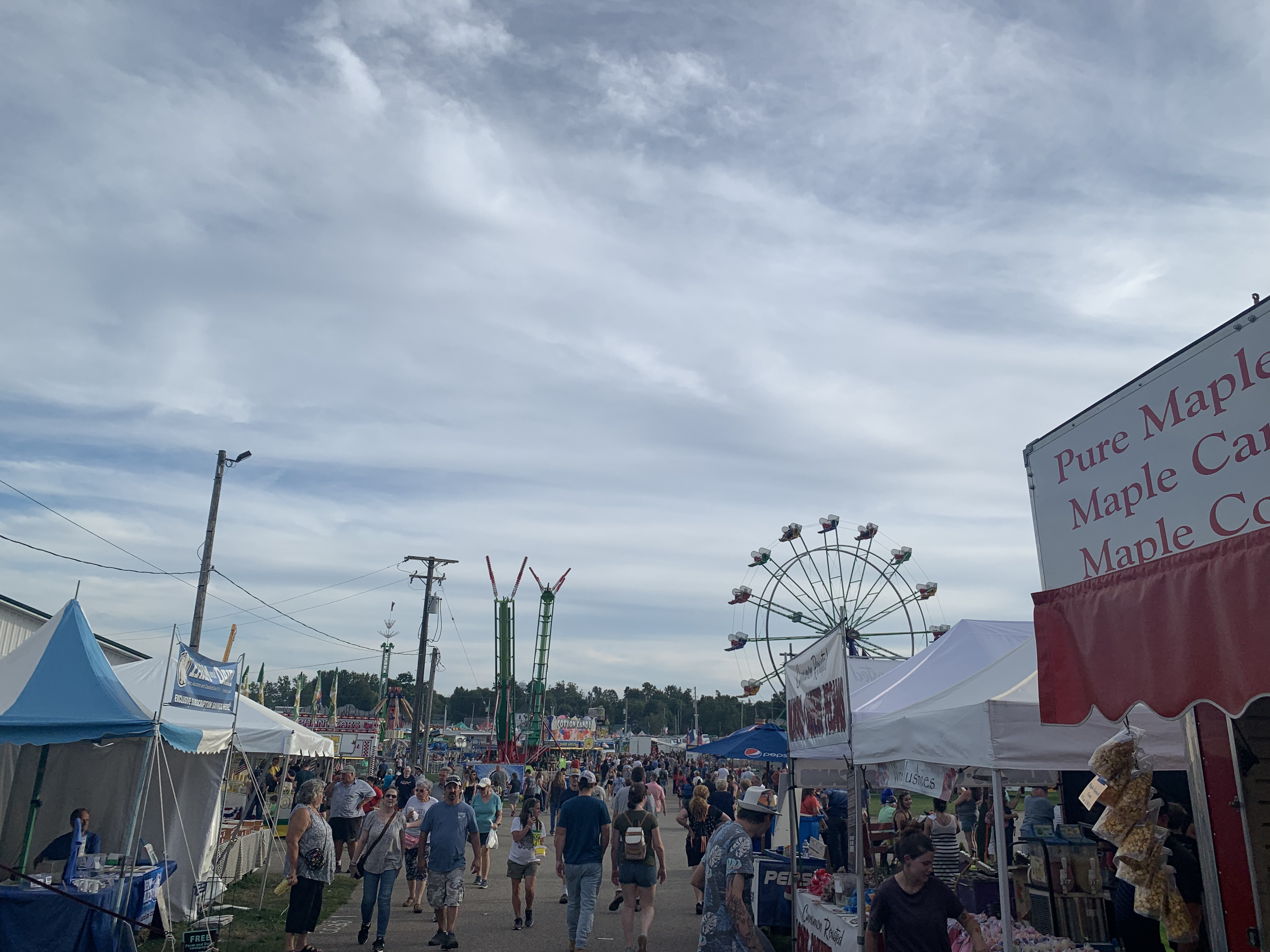
Geauga County Fair, 2022

== History ==
The Geauga County Agricultural and Manufacturing Society was formed in February 1823 to "promote Agriculture & Domestic Manufactures" and held the first annual fair on the square in Chardon, Ohio, on October 23. The early fairs were alternately held in Burton and Chardon, with at least one fair held in Painesville, Ohio, prior to the separation of Lake County from Geauga County in 1840. It has been held exclusively in Burton since the permanent establishment of the official county fairgrounds in the mid-1800s.

Many of the buildings on the grounds used today date back to the nineteenth century, such as:

- Domestic Arts Hall (built 1856, rebuilt 1889), a National Register of Historic Places property since 1979
- Flower Hall (built 1890), a National Register of Historic Places property since 1979
- Small Grandstand replica (original circa 1892, rebuilt 1997)
- Section of the C & E Interurban railway station, now the Fair Administration building

C & E Interurban Station

Hugo Zacchini performed a human cannonball act at the fair in 1972. WEWS-TV recorded and aired the entire act against his wishes and without compensating him, as was required by Ohio law. In Zacchini v. Scripps-Howard Broadcasting Co., the U.S. Supreme Court ruled that the First Amendment did not shield the broadcaster from liability from common law copyright claims.

The fair went on hiatus in 1917–18, 1942–44 and 2020.

== Foundation Board ==
The Foundation Board includes:

- Paul E. Harris, Chairman
- Doug Logan, Vice Chair
- Dianne Kellogg, Secretary/Treasurer
- Robert L. Phillips
- Keith E. Chapman
- Beverly D. McClelland
- James F. Patterson
- John Rowland
- Robin L. Stanley
- Sam Plants
- Vicki Koller

== Fair officers and officials ==
Each year there is an election held for new fair officers. There is also a board of twenty-one elected fair directors. Each fair director is elected from different townships with each holding a term for up to three years. The elected fair officials for the year of 2014 are as follows:

- President – Sam Plants
- Vice President – David Parker
- Secretary – Paul Harris
- Treasurer – Cheri Measures
