= Shrine Circus =

North American circus company

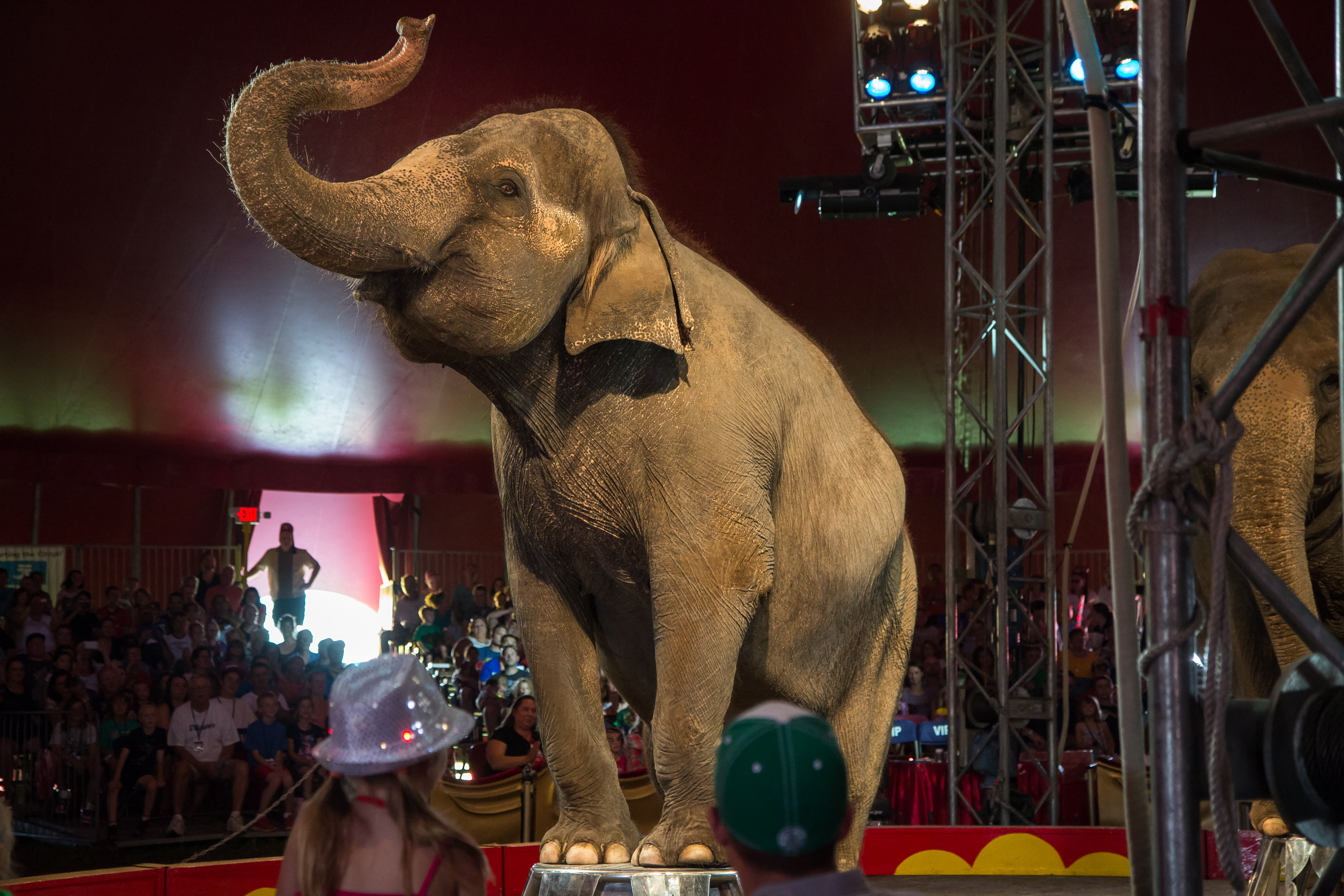
- An elephant performance during a 2014 show in Paris, Ontario

Origin
- Country: United States
- Year founded: 1906

Information
- Operator(s): Shriners International

The Shrine Circus is a circus founded in Detroit, Michigan on Woodward Avenue in 1906. It travels to roughly 120 cities per year in the United States and a separate unit travels to about 40 in Canada. It is affiliated with the former Ancient Arabic Order of the Nobles of the Mystic Shrine, now Shriners International.

== History ==
The circus was originally a one-ring affair, but by 1925 it had grown to three rings. Despite now traveling to many cities, the Detroit affair is still the largest. In 1996, it ran for 17 days with 40 performances making it not only the oldest Shrine Circus, but also the most attended. The most famous venue to host the circus is the Shrine Auditorium in Los Angeles, California, where the Southern California Shrine Circus takes place.

By the 1920s Shrine Circuses were being conducted throughout the country, and each year additional Shrine Centers introduced circuses to their communities. The first Shrine Circus each year is usually in Flint, Michigan, each January. The circus then travels to at least one city per week through November. The last performances are usually held Thanksgiving week in Evansville, Indiana, and New Orleans, Louisiana. The 2005 season ended in Baton Rouge, Louisiana, rather than New Orleans, due to Hurricane Katrina.

The term "Shrine Circus" is usually prefaced by the name of the host Shrine in each geographic area. Over the years many circus stars have appeared in Shrine Circuses, including: Clyde Beatty, the Flying Wallendas, Emmett Kelly, the Flying Concellos, the Hannefords and the Zacchini brothers.
