= Morning Exchange =

Morning Exchange may refer to one of two television programs:

- Morning Exchange (TV programme), a 2003–2005 business news television programme that aired on CNBC Europe
- The Morning Exchange, a 1972–1999 American morning television program that aired on WEWS-TV (channel 5) in Cleveland, Ohio
