= Burton, Ohio =

- Village
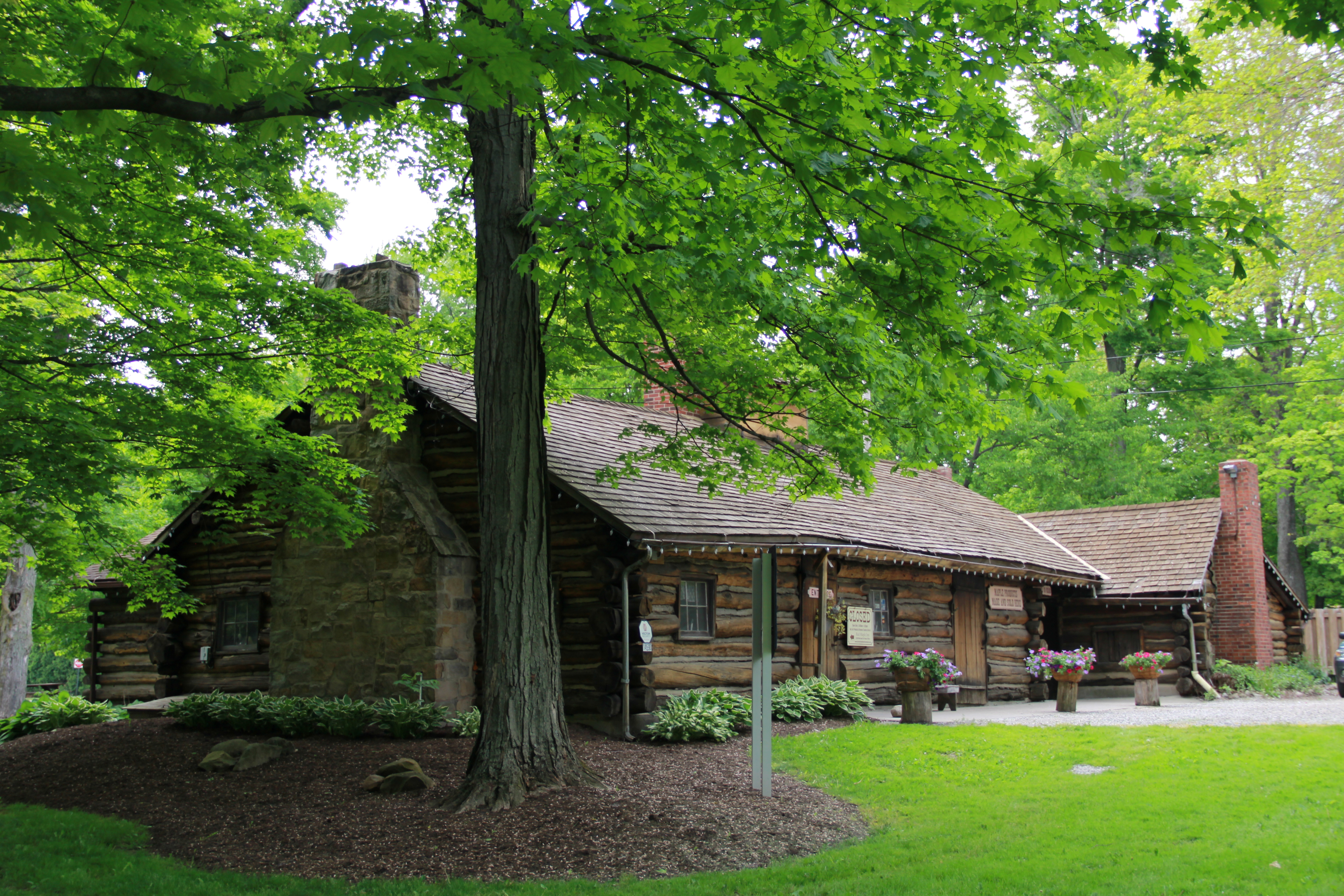
- Maple sugar cabin in the town square
- Motto: "Where History Lives"
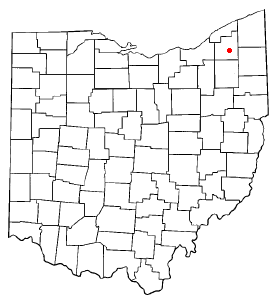
- Location of Burton, Ohio

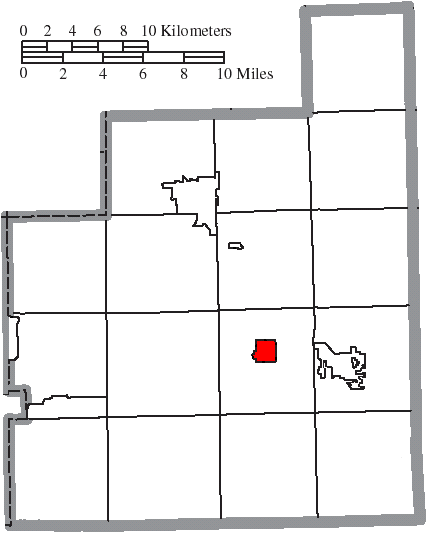
- Location of Burton in Geauga County
- Coordinates: 41°28′14″N 81°08′47″W
- Country: United States
- State: Ohio
- County: Geauga

Area
  - Total: 1.12 sq mi (2.89 km^{2})
  - Land: 1.11 sq mi (2.88 km^{2})
  - Water: 0.0039 sq mi (0.01 km^{2})
- Elevation: 1,309 ft (399 m)

Population (2020)
  - Total: 1,407
  - Estimate (2023): 1,410
  - Density: 1,265.5/sq mi (488.61/km^{2})
- Time zone: UTC-5 (Eastern (EST))
  - Summer (DST): UTC-4 (EDT)
- ZIP code: 44021
- Area code: 440
- FIPS code: 39-10436
- GNIS feature ID: 2397507
- Website: http://www.villageofburton.org

Burton is a village in Geauga County, Ohio, United States. The population was 1,407 at the 2020 census. It is part of the Cleveland metropolitan area. Burton is the location of Century Village, run by the Geauga Historical Society. The museum village is composed of 19th-century buildings moved there from other locations. Many special events are held there each year, as well as at the Geauga County Fairgrounds, also in Burton.

== History ==
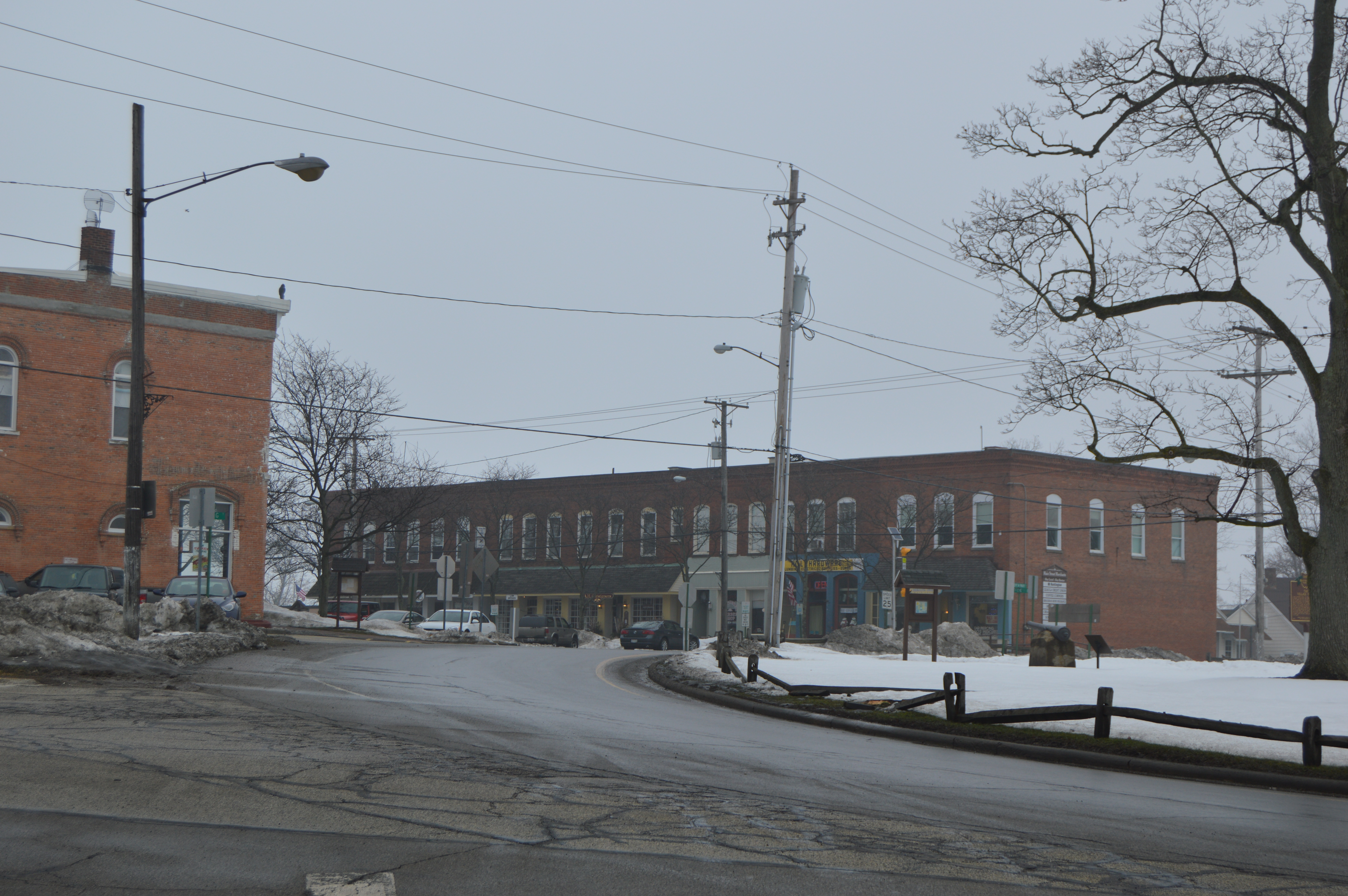
Village commercial district

Burton was founded in 1798 and is Geauga County's oldest settlement. Like many other early settlements in the Connecticut Western Reserve, Burton has a town square patterned after the village greens of New England.

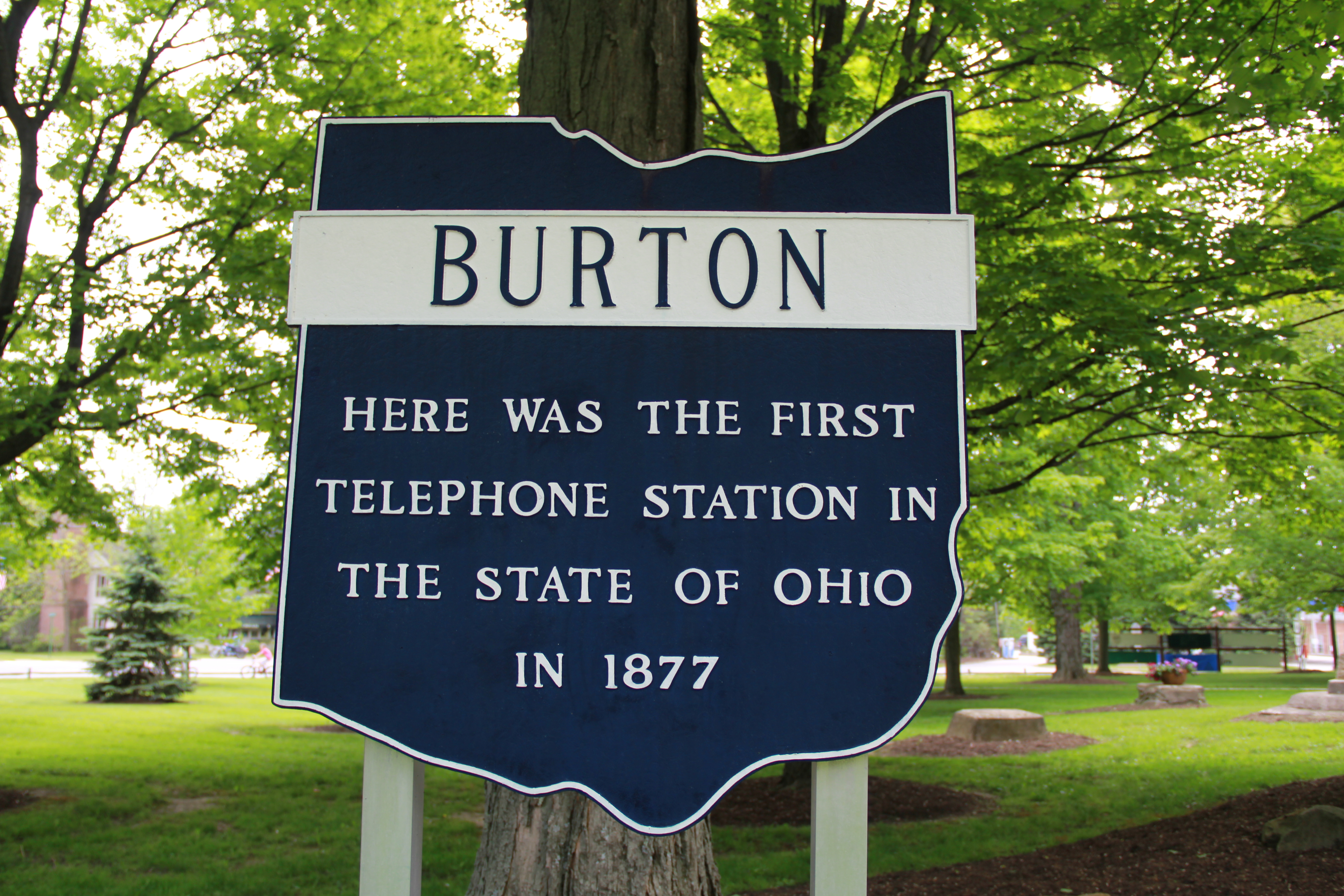
A historical marker for the first telephone station in Ohio.

In 1972, an incident in Burton lead to a U.S. Supreme Court case. Hugo Zacchini performed a human cannonball act at Burton's annual Geauga County Fair, and WEWS-TV recorded and aired the entire act against his wishes and without compensating him, as was required by Ohio law. In Zacchini v. Scripps-Howard Broadcasting Co., the high court ruled in 1977 that the First Amendment did not shield the broadcaster from liability from common law copyright claims.

A historical marker is placed at 41° 28.25′ N, 81° 8.692′ W indicating the location for the first telephone station in the state of Ohio (1877).

== Geography ==
According to the United States Census Bureau, the village has a total area of 1.05 square miles (2.72 km^{2}), all land.

== Demographics ==
Historical population
Census	Pop.	Note	%±
1880	480		—
1890	633		31.9%
1900	727		14.8%
1910	650		−10.6%
1920	592		−8.9%
1930	597		0.8%
1940	761		27.5%
1950	932		22.5%
1960	1,085		16.4%
1970	1,214		11.9%
1980	1,401		15.4%
1990	1,349		−3.7%
2000	1,450		7.5%
2010	1,452		0.1%
2020	1,407		−3.1%
2023 (est.)	1,410	▲	0.2%
U.S. Decennial Census

=== 2010 census ===
As of the census of 2010, there were 1,452 people, 581 households, and 362 families living in the village. The population density was 1,385.7 inhabitants per square mile (535.0/km^{2}). There were 640 housing units at an average density of 609.5 per square mile (235.3/km^{2}). The racial makeup of the village was 97.2% White, 1.2% African American, 0.1% Native American, 0.8% Asian, 0.3% from other races, and 0.4% from two or more races. Hispanic or Latino of any race were 1.3% of the population.

There were 581 households, of which 29.4% had children under the age of 18 living with them, 44.4% were married couples living together, 12.9% had a female householder with no husband present, 5.0% had a male householder with no wife present, and 37.7% were non-families. 31.0% of all households were made up of individuals, and 12.6% had someone living alone who was 65 years of age or older. The average household size was 2.32 and the average family size was 2.92.

The median age in the village was 42.8 years. 21.9% of residents were under the age of 18; 7.8% were between the ages of 18 and 24; 23.2% were from 25 to 44; 26.1% were from 45 to 64; and 21.1% were 65 years of age or older. The gender makeup of the village was 48.4% male and 51.6% female.

=== 2000 census ===
As of the census of 2000, there were 1,450 people, 585 households, and 373 families living in the village. The population density was 1,308.1 inhabitants per square mile (505.1/km^{2}). There were 610 housing units at an average density of 550.3 per square mile (212.5/km^{2}). The racial makeup of the village was 97.45% White, 0.69% African American, 0.21% Asian, 0.07% Pacific Islander, 0.14% from other races, and 1.45% from two or more races. Hispanic or Latino of any race were 0.90% of the population.

There were 585 households, out of which 32.6% had children under the age of 18 living with them, 50.1% were married couples living together, 10.3% had a female householder with no husband present, and 36.1% were non-families. 32.0% of all households were made up of individuals, and 10.6% had someone living alone who was 65 years of age or older. The average household size was 2.32 and the average family size was 2.94.

In the village, the population was spread out, with 23.3% under the age of 18, 7.9% from 18 to 24, 29.5% from 25 to 44, 21.7% from 45 to 64, and 17.6% who were 65 years of age or older. The median age was 38 years. For every 100 females there were 88.6 males. For every 100 females age 18 and over, there were 85.6 males.

The median income for a household in the village was $41,830, and the median income for a family was $51,250. Males had a median income of $35,417 versus $24,519 for females. The per capita income for the village was $19,516. About 5.4% of families and 7.2% of the population were below the poverty line, including 9.4% of those under age 18 and 5.5% of those age 65 or over.

== Transportation ==
=== State highways ===
- , Ohio State Route 87 traverses the village and encircles the town square.
- , Ohio State Routes 168 and 700 become concurrent just south of the village and terminate at the junction of Ohio State Route 87 at the southern end of the town square.

== Education ==
Local elementary and secondary public education is provided by the Berkshire Local School District, which also serves the surrounding communities of Burton Township, Claridon Township and Troy Township, Montville, and Thompson Township. The school district's one high school, Berkshire High School, is located just north of Burton's town square. The district's only elementary school is located in Burton. The Claridon Elementary School was closed in 2005, and the Troy Elementary School was closed in 2009.

== Notable people ==
- Emily Pomona Edson Briggs, 19th-century journalist
- Marion Howard Dunham, teacher, activist, suffragist
- Henry Lawrence Hitchcock, sixth President of Case Western Reserve University
- Harry Smith, professional ten-pin bowler
