= William F. Baker (television) =

American television executive (born 1942)

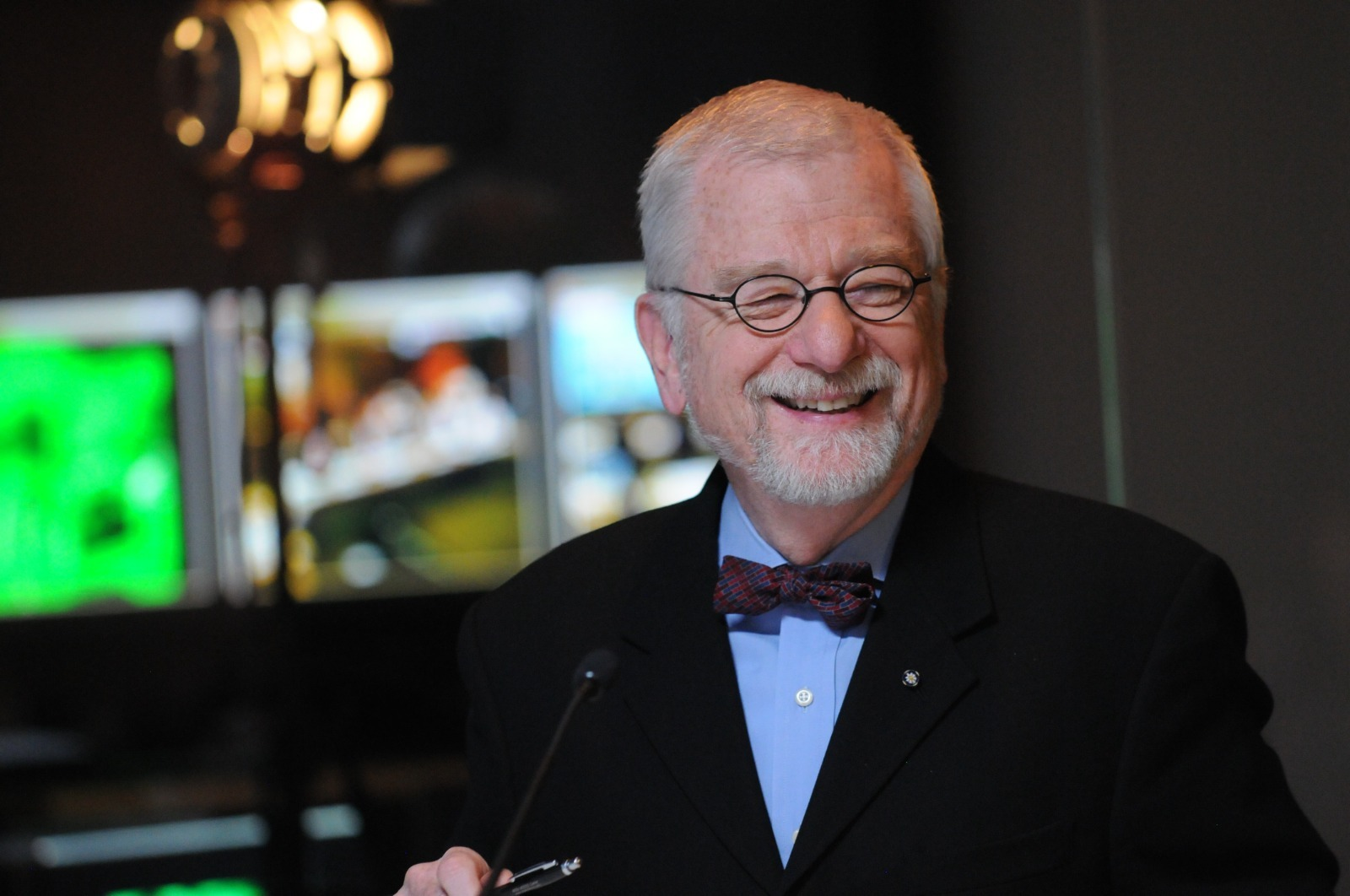
- Born: William Franklin Baker; September 20, 1942 (age 84); Cleveland, Ohio
- Other name: Bill
- Education: Case Western Reserve University

William Franklin Baker (born September 20, 1942) is an American broadcaster, author, academic, and explorer. Baker directs the Bernard L. Schwartz Center for Media, Education, and Public Policy at Fordham University’s Graduate School of Education, where he is Claudio Acquaviva Chair in Education and Journalist in Residence.

He was also a Distinguished Professor of Media & Entertainment at IESE Business School, Barcelona, Spain, and a Professor President Emeritus of WNET. He previously taught business at the Juilliard School in New York City.

He has held additional academic positions including Senior Research Fellow at Harvard’s Hauser Center (2008-2009) and Executive in Residence at the Columbia Business School (2012).

== Career ==
In 1972, at WEWS in Cleveland, Ohio, Baker created The Morning Exchange, a morning program that provided news and weather updates at the beginning and end of each hour, and he used the remaining time to do general-interest and entertainment topics. He later became station manager.

The Morning Exchange was far more than a successful local morning program in Cleveland — it became a prototype for a new style of television that would eventually reshape daytime broadcasting across America. Premiering on WEWS-TV in the early 1970s, the show broke away from the stiff, highly structured format that dominated television at the time. Instead of formal anchors reading headlines from behind a desk, The Morning Exchange embraced spontaneity, personality, casual conversation, lifestyle segments, audience interaction, and a relaxed “living room” atmosphere. Its style would later become the dominant language of morning television nationwide. The show’s influence became especially visible when executives and producers from ABC studied the program while developing Good Morning America. Many of the structural and tonal elements that later defined national morning television — softer seating arrangements, conversational interviews, lifestyle content mixed with news, and hosts with distinct personalities rather than rigid broadcaster personas — were pioneered in Cleveland first. In many ways, The Morning Exchange anticipated the blending of journalism, entertainment, and personality-driven broadcasting that now dominates not only morning TV, but much of modern media culture. Though produced locally, The Morning Exchange helped prove that intimacy and personality could be as powerful in broadcasting as polish and formality — a lesson that transformed television for decades to come.

In 1978 Baker was hired by Westinghouse Broadcasting Company first as VP & General Manager of WJZ, Baltimore, then moved to Hollywood to be president of Group W Productions where he syndicated PM MAGAZINE to over 100 stations with a total staff of 2000, then in 1979 was made President of Westinghouse Television (NY) and Chairman of Group W Satellite Communications. At Westinghouse, Baker introduced Oprah Winfrey as a talk show host. Baker was involved in the early stages of the Discovery Channel and the Disney Channel launches.

He was president of PBS New York’s flagship PBS station, WNET, from 1987 to 2008. At WNET he developed many new series and documentaries. There he expanded the MacNeil/Lehrer news program (later PBS News Hour), and grew Nature, Great Performances and other major national series. He launched Charlie Rose and established the Educational Resources Center, which taught multimedia teaching techniques.

Baker is among the few individuals to have visited both the North and South Poles. His first South Pole expedition took place in December 1974, followed by a North Pole expedition on April 15, 1983, and a return to the South Pole in December 1988. He is the owner of Henry Island, Nova Scotia Canada (since August, 1992) and part-time lighthouse keeper of the working light.

In 2025, Baker Executive Produced Wisdom Keepers, an eight-episode series for national telecast on PBS and streaming on PBS.org. A companion book for the series is also scheduled to be published by PBS Books. Baker has produced many films and television programs and the 2020 Religion News Service podcast BELIEFS.

== Publications and productions ==
Baker has co-authored several books, including:

- Organizations for People (Stanford University Press, 2020)
- The World's Your Stage: How Performing Artists Can Make a Living While Still Doing What They Love (AMACOM, 2016)
- Every Leader is an Artist
- Leading with Kindness: How Good People Consistently Get Superior Results (First Printing, AMACOM, 2008)
- Down the Tube: An Insider's Account of the Failure of American Television
- Lighthouse Island: Our Family Escape

As executive producer, his works include:

- Picturing Mary (2022)
- The Face: Jesus in Art (2021 Emmy-winning documentary)
- Sacred (2017 documentary)
- Leading with Kindness (2008 PBS documentary)

== Awards ==
Baker has received seven Emmy Awards, including the 1987 Trustees Emmy Award. He was also a Distinguished Visitor at the American Academy in Berlin, Class of 2008.

He is a fellow of the American Academy of Arts and Sciences. He has been inducted into the Management Hall of Fame by the National Academy of Television Arts & Sciences (NATAS), the Broadcasting & Cable Hall of Fame, and the New York State Broadcasters Association Hall of Fame. He received the Mark Schubert Award from the Lincoln Center Institute. He has also received two Alfred I. DuPont–Columbia University Awards and the Gabriel Personal Achievement Award. In 2016, the Chamber Music Society of Lincoln Center honored his performing arts work.

== Personal life ==
Baker has a B.A., M.A., and Ph.D. in Communications Sciences and Organizational Behavior from Case Western Reserve University. He is a former chairman of the National Parks System Advisory Board and served on the board of Westinghouse Broadcasting Company (1979-1987) Rodale, Inc. in Emmaus, Pennsylvania, Leitch Electronic(Canada) and Freedom Communications. He served on many nonprofit boards including Catholic University of America, St. Elizabeth College, and PBS.

In cooperation with Fordham University, he taught Juilliard's only business course, The Business of the Performing Arts.

He was married in 1968 to Jeannemarie Gelin, a psychiatric nurse practitioner, in 1968.
