= Wilma Smith (newscaster) =

American journalist

- Born: Wilma Pokorny; July 24, 1946 (age 80); Garfield Heights, Ohio, U.S.
- Education: Bowling Green State University, 1968, B.A. (Speech, English), 1972, M.A. (Journalism)
- Occupation: Television news anchor
- Years active: 1972–2013
- Known for: Longtime TV news anchor/reporter in Cleveland, OH market
- Spouse: Tom Gerber (m. 1982)

Wilma Smith (born July 24, 1946) is a former American local television news anchor who spent most of her career in Cleveland, Ohio. She was with Fox affiliate WJW-TV from 1994 to 2013, following 17 years at ABC affiliate WEWS-TV.

== Early life and education ==
Born Wilma Pokorny, Smith was born and raised in the Cleveland suburb of Garfield Heights. She graduated from Garfield Heights High School in 1964 and then earned a bachelor's degree in speech and English from Bowling Green State University. She also holds a master's degree in broadcast journalism.

== Career ==
=== WXEX-TV (1972–1977) ===
Smith began her broadcasting career in 1972 at ABC affiliate WXEX, Channel 8, in Richmond, Virginia. She was the host and producer of a daily one-hour talk show and anchored the 6 p.m. weekday newscasts, which made her the state's first primetime female anchor.

=== WEWS-TV (1977–1994) ===
Her broadcasting career in Cleveland started at ABC affiliate WEWS, Channel 5, on July 17, 1977, when she became co-host of Afternoon Exchange, and early evening news/interview program. She co-hosted the news program Live On 5 beginning in 1982 and the following year began co-anchoring the 11 p.m. newscast with longtime anchor Ted Henry. Her final on-air appearance at the station was in December 1993.

=== WJW-TV (1994–2013) ===
After completing a contractual no-compete waiting period, Smith joined Cleveland's WJW, Channel 8, in 1994. The move occurred around the time that the station was switching from being a CBS affiliate to Fox. From 1995 to 2005, Smith was the co-anchor of the 5 p.m., 6 p.m., and 10 p.m. newscasts with longtime anchor Tim Taylor. In 2005, Smith and Taylor reduced their schedules to anchoring only the 6 p.m. newscast. In December that year, Taylor retired and Smith began anchoring the newscast with Lou Maglio. Their newscast was number one in the local ratings.

On March 18, 2013, Smith announced that she would retire from her 41-year broadcasting career two months later. She said, "It’s a lovely gift to be able to leave on your own terms" and "It’s been a wonderful career". Her last day was May 22, 2013.

== Awards and honors ==
- 10-time Lower Great Lakes Emmy Award winner.
- 1999 Silver Circle Award winner (Lower Great Lakes Emmy Awards)
- In various polls, she won several titles such as "Cleveland’s Most Watchable Woman", "Best Anchorperson in Cleveland", "Anchor of Excellence", "Newscaster of the Year", and "Best Anchorperson".
- Appeared on the cover of Cleveland Magazine five times.
- Interviewed four presidents.
- Named "Cleveland’s Citizen of the Year for Community Service and Contribution to the Arts".
- Ohio Broadcasters Hall of Fame inductee (class of 1993)
- Cleveland Association of Broadcasters Hall of Fame inductee (class of 2003)
- A proclamation from the Garfield Heights City Council and Mayor's office on May 13, 2013.
- Cleveland Journalism Hall of Fame inductee (class of 2014)

== Personal life ==
Smith resides in Lakewood, Ohio, with her husband Tom and their dogs.
