= Jamestown Academy (New York) =

School in New York

Coordinates: 42°5′51″N 79°14′20.2″W

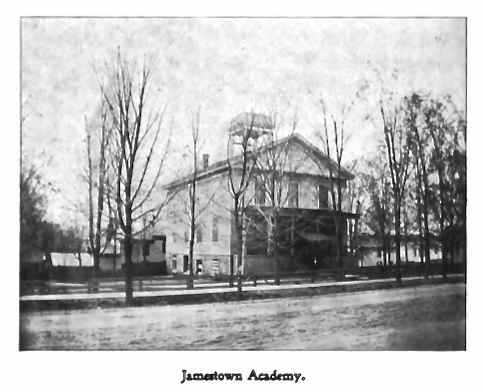
- Jamestown Academy in 1900
- Jamestown, New York, United States

Information
- Type: Private
- Established: 1837
- Closed: 1910

The Jamestown Academy in Jamestown, New York, United States, was a school built in 1810. It was also called the "Old Academy". One of the founders was Abner Hazeltine. It was located on the southeast corner of Fourth and Spring Streets. It was torn down in 1910.

== Notable alumni ==
- Lorin Blodget (1823–1901)
- Chapin Hall (1816–1879)
- Selden E. Marvin (1835–1899), Adjutant General of New York
- George Stoneman Jr. (1822–1894)
- Davis Hanson Waite (1825–1901)
- John Barber White (1847–1923), lumber businessman and member of the Pennsylvania House of Representatives
- Hugo Zacchini (1898–1975)
