= Lorin Blodget =

Lorin Blodget (May 23, 1823 in Busti, Chautauqua County, New York – 1901) was an American physicist and writer. Blodget was born near Jamestown and attended the Jamestown Academy. He later attended a college now called Hobart College in Geneva, New York.

In 1851, he became assistant professor at the Smithsonian Institution at Washington. He may be said to have laid the foundation of American climatology. In 1855, he published a quarto volume of climatological observations, and in 1857 Climatology of the United States, a work extensively circulated and very favorably received in Europe. He was editor of the North American, published in Philadelphia, and secretary of the Philadelphia Board of Trade from 1858 to 1864. He contributed articles on finance to the North American Review in 1866 and 1867, besides making contributions to various other publications.

Besides his work for the Smithsonian, Blodget worked for the War Department to conduct climatological research. Afterward, he worked for the Treasury Department, preparing statistical and financial reports, and later working in specialized positions in the Customs and Treasury Department. Subsequently, he moved to Philadelphia to become the secretary of the Board of Trade and editor of the "North American Review." He was elected to the American Philosophical Society in 1872.
