= Rob Powers =

American sports anchor

- Born: 1965 (age 60–61); Cleveland, Ohio, U.S.
- Education: Holy Name High School (Parma Heights, Ohio), U.S. Eastern Michigan University, (Ypsilanti, Michigan), U.S.
- Occupations: News anchor and television journalist for WEWS-TV in Cleveland, Ohio
- Spouse: Debbie Powers

Rob Powers (born 1965) is an American television news anchor and journalist based at WEWS-TV 5, the Scripps-owned ABC affiliate in Cleveland, Ohio.

Powers was named co-anchor of WEWS's evening newscasts in August 2016. Prior to joining WEWS, Powers was a sportscaster for several major-market television stations, including ABC flagship WABC-TV.

== Career ==
Powers was born in Cleveland, Ohio. Powers' early television assignments included stops in Binghamton, New York, and Indianapolis. He was later named sports director and 5:30 p.m. news anchor for WTVG, an ABC affiliate in Toledo, Ohio (at the time also directly owned by the network).

When not anchoring sports, he was the play-by-play voice announcer for University of Toledo football and basketball, as well as the city's minor league baseball team, the Toledo Mud Hens. After his stay at WTVG, he became the weekday evening and Saturday morning sports anchor for WABC-TV, ABC's flagship station in New York City. On July 28, 2016, Powers announced via Facebook that he would leave WABC-TV on July 29 to return to his hometown, Cleveland, for a news anchor job at ABC affiliate WEWS-TV and to also reunite with his family in Cleveland.

On December 22, 2018, Powers became the host of WEWS' high school quiz Academic Challenge.

== Awards ==
While in Toledo, Powers earned four Emmy Awards., and has gone on to win more Lower Great Lakes Emmy Awards in various categories since coming to WEWS.
