= Zacchini brothers =

American circus duo, human cannonballs

Edmondo and Hugo Zacchini circa 1960-1970

Edmondo Zacchini (1894–1981) and Hugo Zacchini (1898–1975) were American circus entertainers. They were the sons of Ildebrando Zacchini (1868–1948) and came from a large Italian family residing primarily in Tampa, Florida. While not all human cannonballs, all of papa Zacchini's children were circus performers of one sort or another.

Although they were not the first men to perform the human cannonball act, nor the only ones, the brothers quickly became well known for their doings. As well as being human cannonballs, the brothers were also wire walkers, tumblers, trapeze artists and riders. Throughout the years, the Zacchini Brothers worked with various traveling circus companies including Ringling Bros. and Barnum & Bailey Circus. Their show was often referred to as The Greatest Show on Earth and was considered to be a "continental sensation".

Both brothers played significant roles in the show. Hugo, the younger of the two brothers, was deemed the "human cannonball"; he actively participated in the act more regularly than his brother. Edmondo was the brains behind the act. He had studied mechanical engineering and worked tirelessly to perfect the cannon and protect those using it. Calculations were made to ensure the safety of those flying; sometimes, the cannon had to be readjusted in the performance city. Much of the calculation testing consisted of trial and error. Air pressure and windiness were factors that affected the projectile of the cannon. Although the cannon could be adjusted to account for these factors, there was no way to guarantee a safe flight. Edmondo and Hugo both suffered various injuries throughout the years. Edmondo broke his leg five times as a result of the act and had to have many surgeries. After the fifth break, he resorted to becoming the guy to press the button while Hugo shot out of the cannon. Hugo also suffered from a back injury after nearly missing the landing net. Despite the dangers of being a human cannonball, they never fully missed a net and the Zacchini Brothers made considerable amounts of money during their shows. One of their reported earnings for a show was $30 per second.

When the United States began fighting in World War II, many of the Zacchinis were either drafted or signed up for volunteer work to help the war effort. Neither brother could imagine a world without human cannonballs. Edmondo and Hugo turned to their female family members (Edmondo's daughters, Victoria & Duina) and asked them to continue their work. The girls began training in their backyard and carried on the human cannonball act that the Zacchinis were so famous for. After the War, the Zacchini Brothers and their brothers all split up to become a part of different shows.

In 1975 the brothers were inducted into the International Circus Hall of Fame.
