= WEWS-TV =

Television station in Cleveland

- Cleveland, Ohio; United States
- Channels: Digital: 15 (UHF); Virtual: 5
- Branding: News 5

Programming
- Affiliations: 5.1: ABC; For others, see § Subchannels

Ownership
- Owner: E. W. Scripps Company; (Scripps Broadcasting Holdings LLC)

History
- Founded: July 18, 1946
- First air date: December 17, 1947
- Former channel number: Analog: 5 (VHF, 1947–2009)
- Former affiliations: CBS (1947–1955); DuMont (secondary, 1947–1955); NBC (secondary, 1957–1966)
- Call sign meaning: Edward Willis Scripps (founder of the Cleveland Press and the E. W. Scripps Company)

Technical information
- Licensing authority: FCC
- Facility ID: 59441
- ERP: 1,000 kW
- HAAT: 300.7 m (986.5 ft)
- Transmitter coordinates: 41°22′26″N 81°43′3″W

Links
- Public license information: Public file; LMS
- Website: www.news5cleveland.com

WEWS-TV (channel 5) is a television station in Cleveland, Ohio, United States, affiliated with ABC. It has been owned by the E. W. Scripps Company since its inception in 1946, making it one of three stations that have been built and signed on by Scripps (alongside company flagship WCPO-TV in Cincinnati and WMC-TV in Memphis, the latter of which was sold in 1993). WEWS-TV's studios are located on Euclid Avenue (near I-90) in Downtown Cleveland, and its transmitter is located in suburban Parma.

== History ==
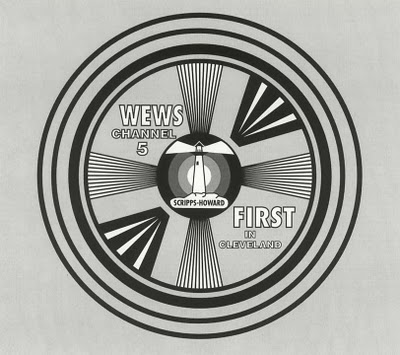
WEWS' test pattern famously declared it to be the "FIRST in Cleveland."

The station first signed on the air on December 17, 1947, as the first television station in Ohio, and the 16th overall in the United States. The call letters denote the initials of the parent company's founder, Edward Willis Scripps. The station is the oldest in Cleveland to maintain the same channel position (as an analog broadcaster), ownership and call letters since its sign-on. A few weeks before WEWS-TV's sign-on, Scripps launched WEWS-FM 102.1 (later occupied by WDOK) as an outlet for WEWS-TV personalities to gain on-air experience before the launch of the television station. Channel 5's first broadcast was of a Christmas pageant direct from Public Hall hosted by actor Jimmy Stewart and staged by the station's corporate cousin, The Cleveland Press. Its staff included capable producers Jim Breslin and Betty Cope, who would later become president of WVIZ (channel 25).

Classic "Circle 5" logo used from 1968 to 1998.

Modified "Circle 5" logo used from 2009 to 2016.

WEWS originally operated as a CBS affiliate, with secondary ABC and DuMont affiliations; it shared the secondary ABC affiliation with WXEL-TV (now WJW-TV, channel 8). WEWS lost the CBS affiliation to WJW-TV in 1955 after that station's then-owner, Storer Broadcasting, used its influence with CBS to land the affiliation; ABC then became channel 5's primary network. The station later lost the DuMont affiliation when that network ceased operations in 1956. WEWS was also an affiliate of the short-lived Paramount Television Network; the station was one of the network's strongest affiliates, airing such Paramount programs as Time For Beany, Hollywood Reel, and Frosty Frolics. WEWS also aired two NBC programs, both of which had been preempted by Westinghouse-owned NBC affiliate KYW-TV (now WKYC): the network's evening newscast The Huntley-Brinkley Report, during the 1959–1960 season; and The Tonight Show, with hosts Jack Paar and later Johnny Carson, from October 1957 to February 1966.

In 1977, WEWS-TV went before the U.S. Supreme Court for recording and broadcasting the entire human cannonball act of Hugo Zacchini. He performed his circus routine at the Geauga County Fair in Burton, Ohio, and the station did not compensate him, as was required by Ohio law. In Zacchini v. Scripps-Howard Broadcasting Co., the U.S. Supreme Court ruled that the First Amendment did not shield WEWS from liability from common law copyright claims.

On May 23, 1994, as part of an overall deal in which network parent News Corporation also purchased a 20% equity interest in the group, New World Communications signed a long-term affiliation agreement with Fox to switch thirteen television stations that New World owned or was acquiring from a Big Three network, including WJW-TV, to Fox. The deal was motivated by the National Football League (NFL)'s awarding of the rights to the National Football Conference (NFC) television package to Fox on December 18, 1993, in which the conference's broadcast television rights moved to the network effective with the 1994 NFL season, ending a 38-year relationship with CBS. As Fox was seen at the time on lower-profile UHF station WOIO (channel 19), CBS immediately targeted WEWS, as well as sister station WXYZ-TV in Detroit as its new affiliates in those markets. On June 16, however, Scripps signed a long-term deal with ABC that would keep WEWS-TV and WXYZ-TV as affiliates of the network; Scripps also agreed to affiliate WMAR-TV in Baltimore, KNXV-TV in Phoenix, and WFTS-TV in Tampa with ABC in the deal.

=== Dual network affiliates ===
From 1955 until December 31, 1996, WEWS held a distinction of being one of two primary ABC affiliates for the Cleveland market. WAKR-TV (channel 49) began operations on June 7, 1953, as a primary ABC affiliate, two years prior to WEWS joining the network. WAKR-TV's ties to ABC dated back to when radio adjunct WAKR signed on in 1940 as an NBC Blue/Blue Network affiliate and were incentivized by ABC's merger with United Paramount Theaters. For the network's part, they were engaged in a push to sign up as many affiliates as possible to compensate for NBC, CBS and Dumont having stronger affiliate bases.

WAKR-TV's launch was delayed for several years: originally intended as a VHF license on a channel 11 allocation assigned to Akron, that allocation was removed as a result of the FCC's 1952 Sixth Report and Order in favor of two UHF allocations, one of which was not considered operable at the time. The station largely lost money in its early years and relied on profits from WAKR to remain solvent even after it moved from channel 49 to channel 23 in 1967. The ABC-TV schedule began to be carried in pattern by WAKR-TV with minimal deviations starting with the 1963–64 television season and carried Good Morning America in its entirety for the market as WEWS opted out for The Morning Exchange at 8 am, a distinction that ended in September 1994. When founding owner Summit Radio/Group One Broadcasting sold off their radio assets in 1986, the TV station was renamed WAKC.

After nearly 40 years of continuous ownership by Summit/Group One, WAKC was sold to ValueVision in late 1993; ABC immediately renewed their affiliation after the sale closed, forcing the home shopping programmer into operating the station as a conventional network affiliate. Following consummation of a subsequent sale to Paxson Communications, the station's entire news department was fired outright on February 28, 1996, and all ABC programming was dropped that December 31. Paxson ultimately used the renamed WVPX-TV as a charter affiliate for the Pax TV network—a direct antecedent of Ion Television—which launched on August 31, 1998. Due to Scripps' purchase of Paxson's successor company Ion Media in September 2020, WVPX was divested to Inyo Broadcast Holdings but has retained affiliations with Ion and other digital subchannel networks operated by Scripps subsidiary Katz Broadcasting.

Among WAKR-TV/WAKC's most notable alumni are two long-tenured WEWS staffers: Ted Henry, who began his career at WAKR-AM-TV as a reporter, and Mark Johnson, who worked at WAKC as a weatherman prior to joining WEWS in 1993 as a meteorologist, where he had a 32-year run until his departure in 2025.

== Programming ==
=== Syndicated and network ===
WEWS carried the 90-minute ABC premiere of The Edge of Night on December 1, 1975. On December 3, it started Edge at 10 a.m. on a one-day delay, and then later pushed up to 10:30 to make way for the national syndication of the talk show Donahue. Edge was dropped in April 1977 when ABC expanded All My Children to one hour and revised the daytime lineup.

In 1969, the station gained some national attention for airing only the first half of Turn-On, because they stated it did not return to the show after the first commercial break, which guest host Tim Conway said was after "15 minutes" but the station claimed had happened after 10 minutes. The rest of the time slot was the emergency procedure, a black screen with live organ music that had not been used in over 20 years. The station's spokesman claimed that the station's switchboard was "lit up" with protest calls, and general manager Donald Perris derided Turn-On as being "in excessive poor taste." Perris sent to ABC president Elton Rule an angry telegram: "If your naughty little boys have to write dirty words on the walls, please don't use our walls. Turn-On is turned off, as far as WEWS is concerned. You tried too hard." Perris told The Cleveland Press that neither he nor program director Ernest Sindelar had previewed the program prior to it being broadcast, remarking:

It was previewed by a member of our staff whose judgment is usually good. Last night it wasn't very good. The show shouldn't have gone on. It's all right to be racy—but this was just plain dirty. This was a hate show. Its spirit was dirty. I watched it at home and I felt very bad that it was on.

In 2004, all the Scripps-owned ABC stations preempted a showing of Saving Private Ryan.

On May 23, 2010, WEWS-TV's broadcast of the series finale of Lost was almost completely interrupted and rendered unwatchable by a number of technical difficulties with the station's digital signal. This caused numerous viewer complaints, leading the station to issue numerous apologies both on-air and on its website.

From the mid-1980s until 2011, WEWS was the Cleveland outlet for popular syndicated programs such as The Oprah Winfrey Show, Wheel of Fortune, Jeopardy!, and Live with Regis and Kathie Lee/Kelly, and throughout that time frame, there was little change in the daytime lineup, as those programs consistently drew good ratings.

In 2011, Oprah Winfrey ended her show after a successful 25-year run. To fill the void, WEWS put The Dr. Oz Show (an Oprah spin-off hosted by Cleveland native Dr. Mehmet Oz), which was airing at 10 am, in the 4 p.m. time slot., and in subsequent years aired various other programs in that slot until settling in with a 4 p.m. newscast in fall 2018. (Dr. Oz ended up moving to WJW until the show ended its run in 2022 due to Oz's commitments to running for the United States Senate.)

On September 14, 2012, the station dropped both Wheel and Jeopardy! after airing both shows for almost three decades, replacing them with The List and Let's Ask America, two more internally produced shows from Scripps. The reason behind the removal of the two hit game shows was because Scripps was looking to stray away from shows that carried a high cost to air on their stations, and instead air shows where Scripps was able to control advertisement, and as a result, are much cheaper to air on their stations. Both game shows ended up moving to WOIO.

Let's Ask America would eventually be canceled in 2015, and WEWS would replace it with the long running celebrity gossip program Access Hollywood. The station also acquired Katie Couric's new talk show and placed it at 3 p.m. following General Hospital's shift to 2 pm, a move that many other ABC affiliates also made. Couric's show would be canceled two years later, and WEWS has aired various other syndicated programs in that time slot ever since. At present, only the program now known as Live with Kelly and Mark continues to air on channel 5 from the original stable of hit syndicated shows.

=== Local programming ===
In its early days as an ABC affiliate, the station produced its own shows in the afternoon, as ABC offered little daytime network programming. Among the local programs offered during the 1950s and 1960s included news analysis from Dorothy Fuldheim, children's programs featuring the "Uncle Jake" character played by Gene Carroll and the "Captain Penny" character played by Ron Penfound, and exercise programs with Paige Palmer. Alice Weston had one of the first live television cooking shows, and Barbara Plummer was "Miss Barbara" for a generation of young viewers on the local version of Romper Room. The most popular show was The Gene Carroll Show, a program that showcased Cleveland area talent which aired Sundays at noon beginning in 1948 and ran well into the 1970s. WEWS also offered a 90-minute afternoon variety show The One O'Clock Club weekdays hosted by Fuldheim and Bill Gordon. The program was so popular that competitor KYW-TV was prompted to organize a competing variety show which was the beginning of The Mike Douglas Show.

During the late 1960s and early 1970s, WEWS produced several programs that eventually entered into national syndication. The first program was Upbeat. Considered by some to be one of the most significant early rock-and-roll variety television shows, Upbeat featured a live audience, a group of dancers and lip-synched (but occasionally live) performances by popular acts of the era. The program began locally as The Big 5 Show, and the name was changed to Upbeat when it went national, altogether running from 1964 to 1971. Among the program's hosts was Don Webster, who later doubled as the station's lead weather forecaster. At its peak, Upbeat was seen in over 100 television markets. Artists who appeared on Upbeat included Aretha Franklin, The Beatles, The Supremes, Simon and Garfunkel, Otis Redding and Stevie Wonder. In fact, Redding's final appearance ever came on the show's December 9, 1967, episode. The next afternoon, his twin-engine airplane crashed in the icy waters of Lake Monona in Madison, Wisconsin, killing all but one of the eight passengers on board.

Another show seen throughout the country was Polka Varieties, an hour-long polka music program that ran locally on Sundays at 1 p.m. from 1956 into the early 1980s, and was syndicated during its later years to 30 television markets. The program featured various popular bands that played Slovenian-style polka, Polish, Italian and Bohemian-style music. "America's Polka King", Frank Yankovic, was the original band to perform on the show. Other bands included Richie Vadnal, George Staiduhar, Markic-Zagger, and Hank Haller. Original host Tom Fletcher was replaced by Paul Wilcox, whose presence became an indelible part of the show. Uttering the well-known show-opening phrase, "From America's Polka Capital of Cleveland, Ohio, this is Polka Varieties, now in its ___ year on the air!" were several famous voices associated with the station over the years, including Cort Stanton, Ralph Gunderman, and David Mark. Black on Black, which examined issues of importance to African American communities, was syndicated to several markets.

From the early 1970s until July 1, 2011, WEWS was Cleveland's television outlet for the Ohio Lottery. On June 2, 2011, NBC affiliate WKYC (channel 3) announced that the station had acquired the rights to air the lottery drawings, as well as its Saturday night game show Cash Explosion. After two years on channel 3, WEWS re-assumed the local television lottery rights on July 1, 2013.

=== The Morning Exchange ===
One program in particular, The Morning Exchange, which ran from 1972 to 1999, changed the face of morning television. It was the first morning show to use a "living room" set, and the first to establish the now familiar concept of news and weather updates at the top and bottom of the hour. During its peak in the 1970s, nearly 70% of all television households in Cleveland were tuned to the program. The format also served as a template for ABC's Good Morning America.

From 1975 to 1978, WEWS completely preempted both AM America and Good Morning America in favor of continuing with The Morning Exchange, and from 1978 to 1994, the station aired only the first hour of Good Morning America, before cutting to The Morning Exchange, but it was changed by the end of 1994.

=== Sports programming ===
WEWS-TV has a long history of covering Cleveland sports teams both produced in-house by the station or through ABC's network coverage. From 2015 to present, channel 5 is the official station for the NFL's Cleveland Browns, airing all non-network preseason games as well as year-round team centered programming.

WEWS has aired two MLB World Series during the station's existence: it broadcast the Cleveland Indians' home games in the 1948 World Series against the Boston Braves, as well as the odd-numbered games of the 1995 World Series, in which the Indians lost to the Atlanta Braves in five games; ABC and NBC (and thus WKYC) alternated games covered as part of The Baseball Network that season. WEWS also aired select Indians games as part of ABC's MLB broadcast contract from 1976 to 1989.

All Cleveland Cavaliers games that air through ABC's NBA broadcast rights are aired on channel 5; the team's 2016 NBA Finals victory (which gave the city its first major sports championship in 52 years) aired on WEWS-TV, as well as their Finals appearances in 2007, 2015, 2017, and 2018.

=== News operation ===
WEWS presently broadcasts 39 1/2 hours of locally produced newscasts each week (with 6 1/2 hours each weekday, four hours on Saturdays and three hours on Sundays). In addition, the station produces the sports highlight and discussion program News 5 Sports Sunday, which airs Sunday nights following its 11 p.m. newscast.

==== Early news coverage ====
WEWS started covering news events soon after it went on air. The winter after it signed on, Cleveland experienced a blizzard, and for the first time WEWS had provided extended coverage for hours. During the early and mid-1950s, channel 5's first newscasts and weather reports were delivered by Tom Field. In 1959, Dorothy Fuldheim—who had been with the station before it even first signed on—began to formulate her own newscast. Fuldheim centered her newscast around her interviews, a general overview of the news, and her commentaries (the very opinionated Fuldheim frequently inserted her own opinions about the stories). Fuldheim was the first female in the United States to have her own television news analysis program.

==== Eyewitness News ====
27-year-old John Hambrick took over as lead anchor on WEWS' evening newscasts on Christmas Day in 1967, with Fuldheim staying on as a commentator. Don Webster presented the weather and Gib Shanley was the sports anchor. In 1968, WEWS changed the format of its newscasts slightly to a version of Eyewitness News. In 1970, Dave Patterson joined Hambrick on the early newscast and then became co-anchor on the 11 p.m. newscast in 1971. Ted Henry, who joined WEWS in 1972 as a behind-the-scenes producer, got his start on the air later in 1975 as a weekend weatherman. In later years, Henry would admit that he, not knowing the slightest thing about forecasting, basically copied his forecasts from a Detroit radio station.

That same year, Bill Jacocks—said to be Cleveland's first full-time African-American anchorman—joined WEWS. Jacocks started as assistant public affairs director, and became weekend anchor in January 1975. For a solid decade (until 1985) Jacocks remained the one constant weekend anchor while many co-anchors came and went. Among those doing their first Cleveland co-anchor stints with Jacocks were Tim Taylor and Wilma Smith (both of whom, coincidentally, would later anchor together at rival WJW).

Hambrick and Patterson continued to anchor the newscasts together until Hambrick left for KABC-TV in Los Angeles in 1975. At that time, Ted Henry became the weekend anchor, and then a year later in 1976, co-anchor on the weekday evening newscasts with Patterson. Henry continued as the lead anchor until his retirement on May 20, 2009. This era marked the start of dominance for the WEWS news programs that lasted until well into the 1980s. In 1977, weekend co-anchor Tim Taylor left WEWS to become a weeknight anchor at WJW-TV. Fuldheim's role decreased as she only presented her interviews and commentaries, but still appeared on the air three times a day until retiring in July 1984 at the age of 91.

WEWS was the first Cleveland TV station to use a news helicopter, introducing "Chopper 5" in 1978. At the time, a cameraman sat partially outside the helicopter door to film the story being covered. TV 5 has used helicopters (on and off) ever since, including the current "Air Tracker 5"—which was introduced in 2016.

The WEWS news department underwent another major change in 1982. Previously, the 5–6 p.m. slot was occupied by The Afternoon Exchange, the afternoon companion to The Morning Exchange. That year, the program adopted a new format, and was renamed Live on Five. The broadcast was originally hosted by Wilma Smith and Don Webster, and retained many elements from The Afternoon Exchange, such as interviews, movie reviews, health reports, and some cooking segments. Added to the mix were news updates from Ted Henry.

In 1985, longtime sports director Gib Shanley—who attained national notoriety six years earlier when he burned an Iranian flag live on the air during a sportscast in the wake of the Iran hostage crisis—left the station, and was replaced by Nev Chandler, who became a noted sportscaster in his own right.

==== News Channel 5 ====
In 1991, WEWS dropped the long-standing Eyewitness News branding, adopting News Channel 5 as a universal branding for newscasts and station promotion. The new branding helped emphasize a format developed by the station the year prior, when WEWS positioned itself as "Cleveland's (Live) 24 Hour NewsSource". Providing news headlines to viewers at times when the station was not carrying regularly scheduled, long-form newscasts, the "24-Hour News Source" concept saw WEWS produce news updates running 30 seconds in length at or near the top of each hour and brief weather updates every half-hour during local commercial break inserts within syndicated and ABC network programs, in addition to the existing half-hourly updates it aired during Good Morning America. The concept would be adopted by network-affiliated television stations in other markets during the early 1990s, as a convenient means for stations to provide news coverage when syndicated or network programming aired. WEWS discontinued production of these hourly updates in 1998.

In 1994, longtime anchor Wilma Smith left the station to sign with rival WJW-TV. The same year, longtime sports director Nev Chandler died of cancer.

1995 saw a modification to the long-running "Circle 5", tilting it at an angle. At this time, a major promotional campaign was launched for the station, "Give Me 5", as it faced competition from WJW (then-recently having switched to Fox), WKYC (rebuilding themselves after years of being used as NBC's farm team), and WOIO (which had just launched their own news department, in partnership with WUAB). This included a two-minute promotional video featuring James Ingram, Andrea McArdle, Curtis King Jr., and Carly Simon, along with numerous athletes, as well as both station personalities and ABC personalities from Cleveland. Edd Kalehoff produced the promo, as well as a comprehensive music package for the station's newscasts and other programming.

==== "On Your Side" era ====
In 1998, WEWS adopted "On Your Side" as its slogan (which it currently still uses). More noticeable, however, was the discontinuance of the station's longtime "Circle 5" logo. That year, WEWS also became the first television station in Cleveland to launch a website—NewsNet5. In 1999, longtime station weather forecaster Don Webster retired from the station after 35 years. In 2000, longtime sports anchor/sports director Matt Underwood left to become an announcer for the Cleveland Indians.

On January 7, 2007, WEWS became the third Cleveland television station to begin broadcasting newscasts in high-definition. At present, all locally produced portions of the station's newscasts, including live remote field footage, are presented in HD. It was also around this time that channel 5 introduced the modified version of the classic "Circle 5" logo that was used until 2016. Sister station WPTV also uses the classic "Circle 5" logo. On May 21, 2009, Ted Henry retired as the primary news anchor at channel 5, after holding the post for 33 years. Henry is the longest serving news anchor in Cleveland television history.

In November 2010, WEWS became the first Cleveland television station to follow a growing national trend in starting its weekday morning newscasts at 4:30 a.m.

==== News 5 era ====
On September 26, 2016, the station retired the NewsChannel 5 name for its newscasts, becoming simply News 5. At the same time, the station began using a graphic identity similar to that of British television network Channel 5 (which used a similar logo from February 2011 to February 2016).

In 2017, longtime WEWS anchors Leon Bibb and Lee Jordan both announced their retirements from the station. Bibb had served as an anchor/reporter at the station since 1995 (coming over from WKYC where he had spent 16 years previous), while Jordan started at WEWS in 1987 as a co-host of The Morning Exchange before becoming an evening news anchor in 1993. To honor their tenures at the station, WEWS renamed their newsroom the Leon Bibb Newsroom, and their main studio the Lee Jordan News Studio.

On June 26, 2023, following the cancellation of The List, WEWS began airing The Debrief, a nightly newscast airing at 7 p.m. originating from and simulcast on Scripps News—a sister network of WEWS, as part of a plan by Scripps to integrate Scripps News programming on their main network affiliates as a way to promote Scripps News and increase the network's exposure. Scripps News ceased operations as a linear channel on November 16, 2024, and with that The Debrief was canceled, and a new local 7 p.m. newscast debuted on November 18, 2024.

==== Honors ====
Two plaques outside the WEWS building commemorate the station's historical contributions. The Ohio Historical Society placed a marker right outside TV 5's building, specifically noting Dorothy Fuldheim's career at the station. The second marker (located on the wall leading up to the front door of the station) is from the Rock and Roll Hall of Fame, honoring the station (along with producer Herman Spero and host Don Webster) as being the home of the popular music series Upbeat! and that program's contributions to Rock and Roll's history.

==== Notable current on-air staff ====
- Rob Powers – anchor

==== Notable alumni ====
- Ernie Anderson
- Leon Bibb
- Nev Chandler
- Liz Claman
- Joel Daly
- Dick Feagler
- Dorothy Fuldheim
- John Hambrick
- Ted Henry
- Bill Jorgensen
- Paige Palmer
- Michael Reghi
- Michael Settonni
- Gib Shanley
- Wilma Smith
- Robin Swoboda
- Tim Taylor
- Matt Underwood
- Don Webster

== Technical information ==
=== Subchannels ===
The station's signal is multiplexed:

Subchannels of WEWS-TV
| Subchannel | Res. | Short name | Programming |
|---|---|---|---|
| 5.1 | 720p | WEWSHD | ABC |
| 5.2 | 480i | GRIT | Grit |
| 5.3 | 480i | LAFF | Laff |
| 5.4 | 480i | IONPLUS | Ion Plus |
| 5.5 | 480i | HSN | HSN |
| 5.6 | 480i | QVC | QVC |
| 55.3 | 480i | REWIND | Rewind TV (WBNX-TV) |
| 55.4 | 480i | HEROES | Heroes & Icons (WBNX-TV) |

Broadcast on behalf of another station

On May 26, 2011, it was announced that WEWS (along with other Scripps stations around the country) had signed a deal to carry the Live Well Network on their digital subchannels. the network began to be carried on digital subchannel 5.2 on September 5, 2011. The subchannel is also currently available on select northeast Ohio cable providers.

Live Well Network announced they would be going off the air in April 2015, and as a result 5.2 switched to the classic TV network Cozi TV at 10 a.m. on April 8. The comedy network Laff debuted on the newly activated 5.3 subchannel a week later. 5.3 was activated on April 7 and ran continuous promos for the network's launch prior to the official premiere date. On April 14, 2017, WEWS discontinued COZI on 5.2 and replaced it with Grit. On November 16, 2024, Ion Mystery replaced Grit on 5.2, which reverted a few months later on January 7, 2025.

On March 1, 2021, 5.5 was activated, airing HSN programming. A year and a half later in September 2022, 5.6 was activated, airing QVC programming.

=== Analog-to-digital conversion ===
WEWS-TV shut down its analog signal, over VHF channel 5, on June 12, 2009, the official date on which full-power television stations in the United States transitioned from analog to digital broadcasts under federal mandate. The station's digital signal continued to broadcast on its pre-transition UHF channel 15, using virtual channel 5.

=== ATSC 3.0 ===
WEWS-TV will be one of the stations available on the WBNX-TV ATSC 3.0 lighthouse which launches on July 22, 2026. It was originally supposed to launch on April 30, but it was delayed because the FCC did not approve the NextGen application in time. It was then moved to May 20, and then did not launch again for the same reason.
