= Paige Palmer =

American fitness and exercise expert

Paige Palmer (January 17, 1916 - November 21, 2009) was a pioneer American fitness and exercise expert, author, columnist, writer, model, television personality, and entrepreneur.

== Biography ==
Palmer was born Dorothy C. Rohrer and raised in Akron, Ohio. She was the hostess of the first daily televised fitness-oriented television show in the United States. The Paige Palmer Show ran on WEWS-TV, Cleveland, Ohio from 1948 to 1973. She is sometimes referred to as the "First Lady Of Fitness". Palmer also designed exercise equipment and fashions for women.

Palmer wrote numerous travel guides, and was also the first person in the world to interview the Dalai Lama after he came out of Tibet. Palmer was honored by the United States Congress for her efforts in "improving the quality of life for American Women." This honor was recorded in the Congressional Record.

Palmer was inducted into the Ohio Women's Hall of Fame in 2000.
