= Upbeat (TV program) =

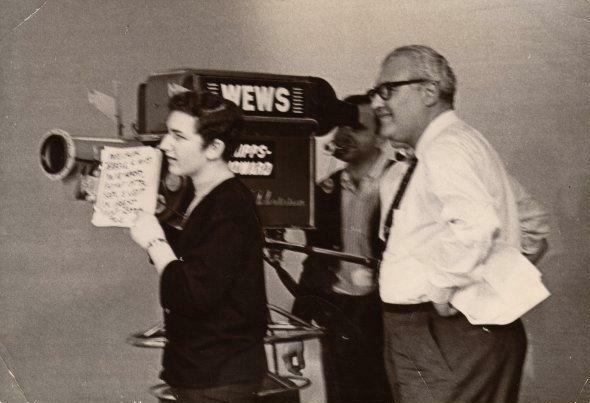
- Herman Spero (right) with his son David on the Upbeat show in 1964.
- Also known as: The Big Five Show
- Presented by: Don Webster
- Country of origin: United States

Production
- Production company: Herman Spero Productions

Original release
- Network: WEWS-TV (1964–1966); Syndicated (1966–1971)
- Release: 1964 – 1971

Upbeat was a syndicated musical variety show produced in Cleveland, Ohio, at ABC affiliate WEWS-TV 5 that aired from 1964 to 1971 (the last five years airing nationally in first run syndication). Upbeat was a showcase for top music acts of the 1960s, featuring performances by a who's-who of future inductees to the Rock and Roll Hall of Fame. Many now-legendary Motown and R&B artists who appeared on Upbeat were in Cleveland to perform at the influential nightclub Leo's Casino, or else had come into town on tour or were en route to New York City to appear on The Ed Sullivan Show.

== History ==
Originally titled as The Big 5 Show, the series began as a local program when it premiered in 1964, the name was a reference to WEWS Channel 5 and the 5 to 6 p.m. time slot on Saturday afternoons. When the program became syndicated nationally, the name of the show was changed to Upbeat, and as stations had the option of airing the program at different times, the program's title change was necessary.

The introduction of the program commenced with a studio musician shouting "hey let's go with the Upbeat show!" as the in-house band, Dave C and the Sharptones, would play the introductory theme song with the program's main title logo, slowly exploding and coming back together again in a quasi-animated frame by frame fashion as the performers were announced for that particular episode. The series was aired in black and white from 1964 until 1967, then broadcast in color from 1967 until the series demise in 1971.

The program's host, Don Webster, was a familiar face to WEWS viewers. In addition to hosting "Upbeat," Webster was also WEWS' weatherman on their nightly newscasts.

== Local and area performers ==
In addition to such local talent as The People's Choice, Ivan and the Sabers, Rapid Transit, the GTOs, the Grasshoppers, the Baskerville Hounds, Bocky and the Visions, the Damnation of Adam Blessing, the James Gang and Raspberries founder Eric Carmen, many regional performers gaining national exposure also appeared on the show including Question Mark & the Mysterians, Terry Knight and the Pack, Mitch Ryder and the Detroit Wheels, the Chylds, the Bob Seger System, Cleveland's the Outsiders and Canton's O'Jays .

=== The Upbeat dancers ===
During years when "Go-Go" was popular, the show featured its own go-go girls made up of area young ladies dressed in the popular outfits and footwear of that period.

Some of the original dancers included: Jeff Kutash, Sue Dubbs, Danny Butler, Judy Kaye, Joan Kuchta, Sandy Salamone, Ginna Sloane, Dr. John Grove, Kathy Watson, Sandy Ashmun, Barbara Chapman, Linda Wike, Lynne Krause, John Harrison and Dave Carter.

Prior to 1966, Upbeat was televised locally. By 1968 it was nationally syndicated in over 100 cities. The dancers during that period (1968–71) included: Joanne Zelasko, Jean Hagadorn, Arlee Gibson, Arline Burks, Linda Wike, Beverly Jones, Constance Gibson, Diane Rini, Jacquelyn Carson, Diane Friedl, John Magill, Kim Havrilla, Kathee Stiber, Jimmy Stallard, Linda Mulcahey, Mary Lynn Curnayn, Michael Ray, Patty Rutti , Marge Fargo and Peggy Miller.

- Flaming Ember performing Westbound #9
- Saturday's Crowd performing "Do I Still Figure In Your Life"
- ? and the Mysterians
- James Brown
- Jackie Wilson
- The 5th Dimension
- The Box Tops
- The Who
- Stevie Wonder
- John Denver
- Jimmy Buffett
- Raven
- The Fifth Estate (band)
- The First Edition
- Al Green
- B.B. King
- The Miracles
- Steve Britt ([203] circa June 29, 1968 (Cleveland))
- Steppenwolf
- The Impressions
- Bobby Sherman
- Love
- The Left Banke
- The Incredible Fog
- The Lemon Pipers
- Van Morrison
- The Vogues
- The Volcanics
- The Monkees
- The Easybeats (performing "Friday On My Mind" and "Heaven And Hell")
- Otis Redding with the Bar-Kays (Appeared on December 9, 1967; Redding and four members of the Bar-Kays died in a plane crash the next day)
- The Yardbirds
- Dave Dee, Dozy, Beaky, Mick & Tich
- The O'Jays
- The Barbarians
- Blue Cheer
- Jefferson Airplane
- Ronnie Dove
- Little Anthony and the Imperials
- Inez & Charlie Foxx
- Lesley Gore
- Frankie Valli and the Four Seasons
- Jerry Lee Lewis
- Paul Revere and the Raiders
- The Shadows of Knight
- The Music Explosion
- Richard and the Young Lions
- The Shangri-Las
- The Velvet Underground (1969) This is believed to have been the band's only national TV appearance.
- Jerry Butler
- Jack Blanchard & Misty Morgan
- Funkadelic
- Keith and the Wild Kingdom
- Wilmer and the Dukes
- Chubby Checker
- The Mob
- The Outsiders
- The Ides of March
- The Buckinghams
- The New Colony Six
- The Mauds
- The Cryan' Shames
- The American Breed
- The Epic Splendor
- The Epitome Of Sound
- The Gurus
- The Blue Jays
- The Blue Jays - originated in Providence, RI
- Blood, Sweat & Tears
- Spanky and Our Gang

== Legacy ==
The show was mentioned in the lyrics of the 1980 Ramones song "Do You Remember Rock 'n' Roll Radio?" — "Do you remember Hullabaloo? Upbeat, Shindig! and Ed Sullivan, too?"

Upbeat was inducted into the inaugural class of the Rhythm and Blues Music Hall of Fame in August 2013.

== See also ==
- Upbeat (music)
