= Don Webster (media personality) =

Canadian media personality (1939–2018)

- Born: Donald George Webster; May 6, 1939; Chatham, Ontario, Canada
- Died: December 13, 2018 (aged 79); Westlake, Ohio, U.S.
- Occupation(s): TV host, weather forecaster
- Awards: Ohio Broadcasters HOF; Cleveland Broadcasters HOF

Donald George Webster (May 6, 1939 – December 13, 2018) was a Canadian-born television host, weather forecaster, and station manager who is best known as the host of the nationally syndicated music program Upbeat and the longtime weatherman for Cleveland, Ohio ABC affiliate WEWS-TV 5.

== Life and career ==
Webster was born in the city of Chatham, Ontario, Canada in 1939. His father died when he was eleven years old. After graduating high school, he went to work in the radio business, working in stations in Hamilton, Ontario, and Montreal, Quebec.

In the early 1960s, Webster had become host of an American Bandstand-style dance show in Hamilton. In 1964 (after then WEWS general manager Don Perris just happened to see his Canadian show on TV while on vacation in Erie, Pennsylvania) Webster was brought to Cleveland to host a local music and dance program called The Big 5 Show. The show was a success, doing so well that in 1966, it was syndicated nationally under the title Upbeat. The show had been able to draw many big names in the music industry to Cleveland to perform on the show, and with that Webster had numerous national job offers, including working for American Bandstand host Dick Clark.

Webster however chose to remain in Cleveland, and when Upbeat was cancelled in 1971, he became the weatherman for WEWS' Eyewitness News newscasts. Webster was chosen for this job, as he had studied meteorology en route to becoming a certificated pilot. Webster was the chief weatherman at WEWS throughout the 1970s, into the 1980s, and returned to the post through most of the 1990s. Webster had left the weather desk for a time in the 1980s to become WEWS station manager, stepping down in 1989 to resume his weather duties.

In addition to Upbeat and weather forecasting, Webster had also during his tenure at WEWS-TV 5 served as host for the Ohio Lottery drawings, was an original host of The Morning Exchange, and hosted a local version of Bowling for Dollars. He also hosted The Gene Carroll Show after Gene Carroll died, as well as serving as the long time host of Academic Challenge.

== Later life and death ==
Webster retired from WEWS in 1999, moving to Hilton Head Island, South Carolina with his wife Kandi. Though he was retired, he still appeared occasionally in Cleveland media, doing ads for local hearing loss centers and assisted living facilities. Webster died on December 13, 2018.

== Awards and honors ==
- 1995 Lower Great Lakes Emmy Awards Silver Circle Award recipient
- 1995 inductee — Ohio Broadcasters Hall of Fame
- 1999 inductee — Cleveland Association of Broadcasters Hall of Fame
