= Royal Hanneford Circus =

American-based touring family circus

Origin
- Country: United States, Europe
- Founder(s): Tommy Hanneford
- Year founded: 1965 (modern)

Information
- Traveling show?: yes
- Website: royalhannefordcircus.org

The Royal Hanneford Circus is an American-based touring family circus. With origins dating back to 1690, it has been called the oldest circus in the world. The family first performed as a traveling troupe in 1807. In 1903, the family began its own circus as the "Hanneford Royal Canadian Circus" and in their early seasons toured the British Isles and Continental Europe. The family performed separately throughout much of the early 20th century in the United States. The modern Royal Hanneford Circus was formed in 1965, when Tommy Hanneford began producing shows featuring the family.

== History ==
=== Early origins ===
Accounts of the early origins of the Hanneford family performances conflict. Some accounts claim that the Hanneford family began performing as early as 1690, when the Irish-born Michael Hanneford entertained royalty with bareback riding, acrobatics, and juggling. The family themselves claim their oldest involvement with the circus involved Edwin Hanneford, a juggler from London. In 1778, Edwin was summoned by King George III to compete against Walter Scott to determine the best juggler in England. However, during the competition, King George became too preoccupied with other issues and did not declare a winner.

=== European traveling shows ===
The Hanneford family first traveled as a troupe in 1807. Successive generations of the family were involved in performances as well. By 1903, the family had their own circus production, the Hanneford Royal Canadian Circus. They performed under a canvas tent and traveled to cities and villages in the British Isles via horse-drawn wagons. During the winter months they performed with other acts indoors throughout Europe. In 1915 the family was performing in Spain while John Ringling of the Ringling Brothers Circus was in attendance. After seeing the production, Ringling wanted to bring the family to perform in the United States. In order to do so, Ringling purchased the entire circus. At that time, the family consisted of George Hanneford Sr. and his wife Catherine, Edwin "Poodles", George, Grace, and Elizabeth.

== Poodles Hanneford ==
Poodles Hanneford
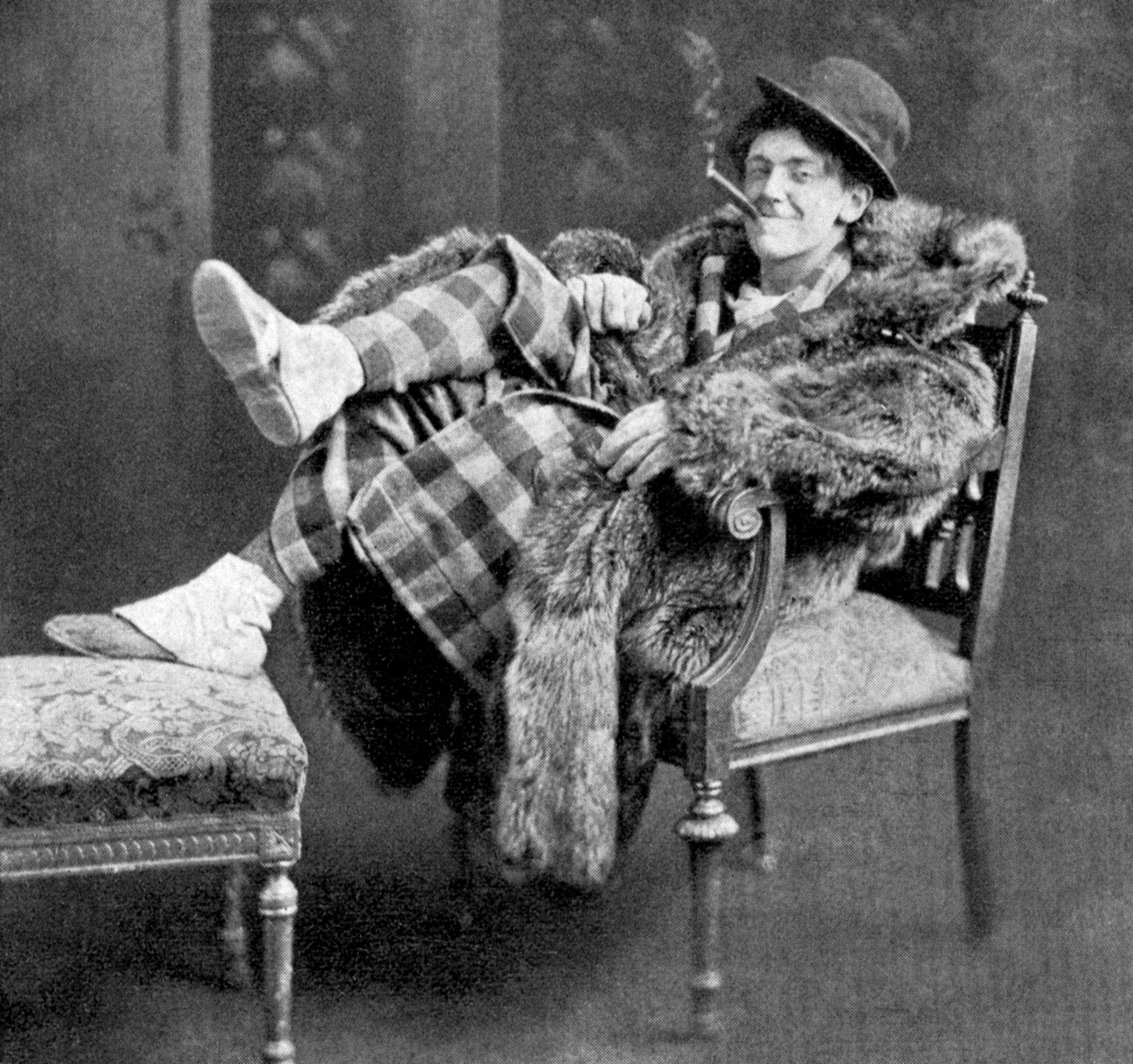
- Hanneford in 1924
- Born: Edwin Hanneford; 14 June 1891; Barnsby, Yorkshire, England
- Died: 9 December 1967 (aged 76); Kattskill Bay, New York, U.S.
- Occupations: Clown, circus equestrian, trick rider, actor, comedian
- Spouse: Grace Norma

Edwin "Poodles" Hanneford (1891–1967) was an equestrian clown who was praised by Buster Keaton as "the only trained acrobat I ever saw who could take a fall and make it look funny." Poodles is considered among the greatest trick riders in history. He was the first to perform a somersault from one running horse to another. He held a Guinness Book of World Records record for performing a running jump onto a horse and stepping off 26 times in a row.

Poodles appeared in over 40 films, including two starring series of silent comedies: one for Educational Pictures in 1923–1924, and another for Weiss Brothers in 1928. He retired in 1954, apart from one last film appearance in 1962. He was enshrined in the International Circus Hall of Fame in 1968.

In the 1950 film All About Eve, "Sarah Bernhardt and Poodles Hanneford" are among the exemplars that director Bill Sampson cites in his impromptu backstage lecture to Eve Harrington, about the theatre and what it means.

== Hannefords in the United States ==
Upon coming to the United States, the Hannefords performed with various acts. The family's first credited appearance in American film is When I Grow Up, released in 1951.

The next patriarch after Poodles was Tommy Hanneford, son of George Sr. and nephew of Poodles, who began performing as a clown in 1933 when he was five years old. He was called "The Funniest Man on Horseback" for his comic equestrian performances. He performed from the 1930s through the 1960s, except for a period beginning in 1946 when he served in the United States Army. In addition to his circus performances, he appeared on television, in films, and at most major Shrine circuses throughout the United States. The family was considered reunited in 1965 at Pleasure Island Park in Wakefield, Massachusetts. Tommy organized the performance that featured his sister Kay with a dog act, his wife Struppi on a high wire, and was called the Hanneford Family Circus. Tommy later incorporated the act in Macon, Georgia and it became the first time the family had owned their own circus since his father George Sr.

The family's first major production was in September 1966 in Saginaw, Michigan. Tommy's brother George Jr. was featured in a bareback riding act. The performance is considered the first of the "Royal Hanneford Circus". In 1968, Tommy joined producer Bill English, and in 1969 the two men were joined by Art Concello, formerly general manager of the Ringling Bros. and Barnum & Bailey Circus. The three men operated Circus Classics, Inc. until they separated in 1974. In 1975, Tommy reorganized the Royal Hanneford Circus.

George Sr. Hanneford was inducted into the Circus Hall of Fame in 1977, his wife Catherine in 1990, and Tommy posthumously in 2008, following his death in 2005. Tommy's wife Struppi was inducted into the Circus Hall of Fame in 2015.

=== Fort Lauderdale Swap Shop ===
In 1989, the Royal Hanneford Circus began performing at the Fort Lauderdale Swap Shop, performing every day of the week save for Tuesdays. Following the death of Tommy, his brother George Jr. and sister Catherine assumed control of the circus. In 1993, the Swap Shop owner Preston Henn had been sued over injury to a circus performer, leading him to require the circus to provide worker's compensation insurance to its employees. In July 2006, the circus was evicted from the Swap Shop for violating that agreement.

Prior to the eviction, the circus employed about a dozen performers and owned nine animals. The use of animals in the Hannefords' circus acts at the Swap Shop attracted the attention of animal rights activists, including the Animal Rights Foundation of Florida (ARFF), which had long accused the circus of animal cruelty. However, George Jr.'s son, George Hanneford III, denied these claims, as well as rebuffed an offer from ARFF to adopt and relocate the animals.
