= Michael Settonni =

American TV news anchor & reporter (1959-2021)

Michael Settonni (August 13, 1959 – May 10, 2021) was an American on-air television news anchor and reporter who last worked for WEWS-TV in Cleveland, Ohio. He was born in Middleburg Heights, Ohio in 1959. Settonni, a 1977 graduate of Midpark High School in Middleburg Heights, Ohio, graduated from Ohio State University in 1981 with a degree in journalism. He worked for NBC, CNN, The Walt Disney Company and network affiliated television stations in Boston, San Diego, Cleveland, OH, and Portland. Michael died unexpectedly on May 10, 2021.

== Career ==
Settonni was President and CEO of Broadcast Media Ideas, a Cleveland-based full-service creative agency that works with companies and organizations - both large and small - to maximize jointly developed ideas using broadcast, CD-ROM, DVD, Internet web-streaming and non-traditional communication channels. "Come Join Our Success", an interactive video CD-ROM produced for the City of Cleveland, was awarded the prestigious AEGIS award for national excellence.

Settonni served as Communications Director for the Mayoral campaign of former Cleveland mayor Jane Campbell, and as Chief Campaign Strategist for the successful Mark Elliott for Mayor of Brook Park campaign, as well as dozens of other local area Mayor, Judicial and School Levy Campaigns.

== Personal life ==
In 2009, Settonni was a candidate for Middleburg Heights, Ohio City Council, but withdrew after a domestic dispute with his wife, Nancy.

== Awards ==
Settonni earned 8 Emmy awards, 4 Golden Mike Awards and more than a dozen Press Club awards for his television work locally, nationally and internationally. He was also honored by the Center of Mental Retardation with the Media Award for his contributions to creating awareness about the needs of those with disabilities. United Cerebral Palsy of Greater Cleveland also named Mr. Settonni volunteer of the year in 2001.

- San Diego Emmy Awards, Outstanding Achievement News Feature, 1991
- San Diego Emmy Awards, Outstanding Achievement Journalistic Enterprise, 1990
- San Diego Emmy Awards, Outstanding Achievement, 1992
- San Diego Emmy Awards, Outstanding Achievement, 1990
- San Diego Press Club, Best Investigative Reporting, 1991
- San Diego Press Club, Best Regular Special Segment Edition, 1992
- San Diego Press Club, Best Show of Television, 1993
- San Diego Press Club, Best General Reporting, 1993
- San Diego Press Club, Best News Story, 1993
- Cleveland Emmy Awards, Outstanding Achievement, 1995
- Boston-New England Emmy Awards, Outstanding Breaking News, 1994
- RTNA Golden Mike Award (Radio and Television News Association of Southern California), Best Investigative Reporting, 1992
- RTNA Golden Mike Award (Radio and Television News Association of Southern California), Best News Special, 1992
- RTNA Golden Mike Award (Radio and Television News Association of Southern California), Best Spot News Reporting, 1992
- RTNA Golden Mike Award (Radio and Television News Association of Southern California), Best Regular Scheduled Specialized Segment, 1990
