= The Morning Exchange =

American local morning television program

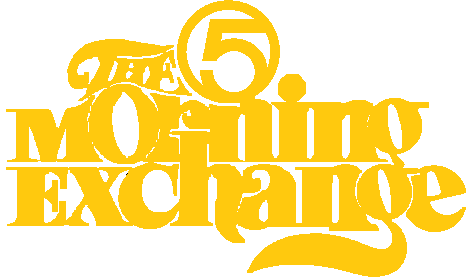
- Also known as: The Alan Douglas Morning Exchange (1972); Today's Morning Exchange (1998–1999)
- Genre: Breakfast television program
- Created by: Donald L. Perris; William F. Baker
- Presented by: Alan Douglas (1972); Don Webster (1972); Fred Griffith (1972–1999); Liz Richards (1972–1979); Joel Rose (1972–1984, 1986–1990); Jan Jones (1979–1983); Randi Hall (1984–1986); Lou Maglio (1984–1993); David Moss (1985–1993); Lee Jordan (1987–1993); Jon Loufman (1990–1994); Liz Claman (1991–1995); Connie Dieken (1993–1998); Mark Johnson (1993–1999); Robin Swoboda (1998–1999); Danita Harris (1998–1999)
- Country of origin: United States
- Original language: English
- No. of seasons: 27

Production
- Production location: Cleveland, Ohio
- Camera setup: Multi-camera
- Running time: 120 minutes (1972–1998); 60 minutes (1998–1999)
- Production company: Scripps-Howard Broadcasting

Original release
- Network: WEWS-TV
- Release: January 3, 1972 – September 10, 1999

The Morning Exchange (referred to as MX in shorthand) is an American morning television program that aired on WEWS-TV (channel 5) in Cleveland, Ohio from 1972 to 1999.

A highly rated and influential program, it was commonplace that on a typical day in the 1970s, over two-thirds of all television sets in the Cleveland market were tuned to The Morning Exchange. In 1975, ABC (of which WEWS is an affiliate) recognized the show's success and used MX as a template for their (then new) national morning show – creating Good Morning America.

== History ==
The Morning Exchange incorporated many elements that would be used in morning television programs of the present day. It was the first morning show to use a "living room" set and establish the now familiar concept of news and weather segments at the top and bottom of the hour. The remainder of the program time was used to discuss general interest/entertainment topics. In a 2006 interview, Ken Lowe, the CEO of Scripps-Howard Broadcasting said, "The Morning Exchange was a huge risk that Don Perris took at the time. A lot of people thought that he was out of his mind when he suggested a morning show of that nature. Of course, we all know that [the show's format] went on to become [the standard for all of today's network morning shows.]" Fred Griffith, the program's longtime host, talked about the groundbreaking format in another 2006 interview saying, "We talked about death, sexuality, dealing with career choices, how to establish long lasting relationships, we talked about all those kinds of things that are just routine now, but [at the time] we were pioneers."

The show, originally called The Alan Douglas Morning Exchange and premiering on January 3, 1972, was created by Donald L. Perris and William F. Baker as an alternative to the solely news-based morning shows at the time. Originally hosted by Alan Douglas, when the show debuted, a traditional news desk set was used. Don Webster served as the announcer and did some of the show's interviews and Joel Rose read the news. In March 1972, Don Webster briefly left WEWS and was replaced by Liz Richards, who became a co-host and the weather presenter. In July of that year, Douglas left the station and was replaced by Griffith, who had been a member of the station's news department since 1966. The choice of Griffith as a co-host of the show was only meant to be temporary, but Griffith remained a co-host throughout the remainder of the program's history.

In August 1972, the program's producers decided to replace the news desk set with a set that resembled a suburban living room; Griffith, Richards, and Rose would instead recline on couches. Producers felt that this would make viewers feel more relaxed and comfortable. This idea seemed to work, as the format became more relaxed as the hosts developed chemistry on screen. As a result, many viewers felt that the on-air set was an extension of their own living room and that the personalities were a part of their families. MX quickly became extremely popular, with an average of 67% of television viewers tuning in each day.

The format was so successful that ABC used The Morning Exchange as the pilot for its national morning program Good Morning America, which replaced the struggling A.M. America in 1975. The format quickly caught on and soon GMA beat NBC's Today in the ratings. Soon thereafter, both NBC and CBS adopted the format for their morning shows.

On March 16, 1979 in an emotional episode, a tearful Richards left the show in order to care for her children. This followed years of her personal life and her volatile marriage to Cleveland disc jockey Gary Dee spilling over into the headlines on other news outlets. She was replaced by Jan Jones. In 1983, Jones became a consultant for WEWS and left the show. Joel Rose left WEWS-TV in 1984, to devote himself full-time to his talk show on radio station WJW (850 AM, now WKNR), and Randi Hall became the new co-host of the show for a year-and-a-half. Rose would return to the show in 1986 and remain until 1990. The news segment updates were now delivered by either Jenny Crimm or Lou Maglio. Unlike Rose, however, Crimm and Maglio simply read the news and were not co-hosts. In 1987, Lee Jordan became the new co-host, filling the void left by Hall's earlier departure.

From 1976 to 1982 and then again from 1988 until the show's end, Lynda Hirsch provided recaps and previews of soap operas. She developed such a reputation on the show that she was given her own nationally syndicated newspaper column.

David Moss (now with WJW, channel 8) served as entertainment reporter from 1985 to 1993. In 1990, Jon Loufman (now with CBS affiliate WOIO, channel 19) joined the show and provided weather reports and a number of live shots. In 1993, both Maglio and Moss left the show for new positions at WJW-TV, while Loufman left for WKYC-TV (channel 3) (and later, WJW-TV). Loufman was replaced by Mark Johnson. Later in 1993, Lee Jordan moved from MX co-host to WEWS evening co-anchor (to replace the departing Wilma Smith) and was replaced by former WKYC anchor Connie Dieken.

=== The Weekend Exchange ===
From 1995 to 1997, the program expanded to include Saturday and Sunday editions entitled The Weekend Exchange. The show was hosted solo by Leon Bibb and was broadcast from a set different from the one used for the weekday edition. The Weekend Exchange consisted solely of interviews conducted by Bibb and did not include any news or weather updates. The format was later reworked into WEWS' weekend public affairs program Kaleidoscope, which is also hosted by Bibb.

== Decline ==
WEWS originally chose not to air A.M. America and later Good Morning America, electing to run The Morning Exchange in the 7–9 a.m. timeslot. In 1978, WEWS began airing one hour of Good Morning America from 7 to 8 a.m. and then The Morning Exchange from 8 to 10 a.m. (the Cleveland market's secondary ABC affiliate at the time, Akron-based WAKR-TV, channel 23 – later WAKC and currently Ion Television owned-and-operated station WVPX-TV – carried Good Morning America in its entirety throughout the 1980s and early 1990s).

On September 12, 1994, WJW-TV, as part of a group-wide deal involving the station's then-owner New World Communications, dropped its CBS affiliation and joined Fox. During the transition period, CBS attempted to negotiate a deal with WEWS owner Scripps-Howard to have WEWS and one-time ABC O&O WXYZ-TV in Detroit, Michigan affiliate with the network (Detroit's then-CBS affiliate WJBK-TV was also involved in Fox's group deal with New World). Instead, the company informed ABC of CBS's intentions and convinced ABC to increase the affiliation fee it paid to WEWS, which resulted in a group-wide affiliation pact with the network that triggered, among other deals, Westinghouse's affiliation pact (and later, merger) with CBS. However, in addition to agreeing to stay with ABC, Scripps lost most of the remaining leverage for local schedule control it had for the network. For WEWS, this meant by network mandate, it would also have to agree to broadcast the full two hours of Good Morning America. By 1994, WEWS was the only ABC station remaining among the 25 largest television markets in the country that did not broadcast the full two hours of GMA.

That move proved devastating to The Morning Exchange. Its timeslot was pushed back to 9–11 a.m., missing the commuter rush hour audience. Additionally, the show's original target audience, stay-at-home housewives and mothers, had nearly disappeared since the show's debut, as more women entered the workforce, and those that remained began to regard the show's format as antiquated. In addition, other stations also began increasing the amount of local programming it aired in the early morning hours. Most notably, WJW easily and successfully compensated for the loss of the perennially low-rated CBS This Morning as a result of the Fox switch by expanding its weekday morning newscast to 9 a.m., and later, beyond. The only remaining advantage for WEWS was that ABC's late morning programming at the time, including Home, Mike and Maty, and Caryl & Marilyn: Real Friends, was wholly uncompetitive nationwide, had no ownership stake by ABC, and was easily pushed into the late night graveyard slot, as WEWS did with all three series in favor of MX.

At the end of 1996, WAKR ended its ABC affiliation, leaving WEWS to be the area's only ABC affiliate, but also removing a buffer that allowed the station to direct viewers to pre-empted network programming, placing additional pressure on the station to air ABC programming in pattern.

In 1997 as part of another Scripps/ABC deal, WEWS began airing Live with Regis and Kathie Lee during the 9 a.m. hour, bumping The Morning Exchange to the 10 a.m. to noon slot (the station had been airing Live from 11 a.m. to noon, two hours later than most stations that carry the program, ever since it debuted in national syndication in 1988). In an unusual move, WEWS slotted the syndicated (and at the time, half-hour) Martha Stewart Living program in the middle of the MX broadcast, making it appear as if it was an extended segment of the show.

In 1998, major changes occurred to the program: it was retitled Today's Morning Exchange and was soon reduced to one hour, in an attempt to save the declining show. Viewers and ABC had also begun to clamor for The View, which premiered in 1997 to acclaim and success compared to ABC's past late morning programs (and was also under the network's full editorial control), to air in Cleveland at its prescribed time. WEWS had continued to delay The View to late night until January 18, 1999, when it began to air in its proper 11 a.m. time slot, leaving MX with little natural flow between Live! and The View. Fred Griffith was demoted to a field reporter with morning meteorologist Mark Johnson taking his place as co-host, along with former WJW-TV news anchor Robin Swoboda. The resulting show departed significantly from the program viewers were used to, and ratings declined even further.

After only several months, WEWS announced that it would end The Morning Exchange after 27 years. The final week's editions saw Griffith return as host and featured "MX Moments" from throughout the show's run. The last broadcast, which aired on September 10, 1999, included former co-hosts, reporters, and contributors, and live interviews with some of the hosts of morning shows that used the MX format, including Good Morning America. All of the other program's hosts praised MX for being the pioneer in establishing the format used by nearly all morning interview programs.

== Post Morning Exchange ==
- Robin Swoboda, became anchor at WEWS in 1999; she later served as a host on Cleveland Christian music station WFHM-FM (95.5) from 2002 to 2005, and then hosted a MX-style program on Fox affiliate WJW called The Robin Swoboda Show (originally titled That's Life) from 2007 to 2011. From 2012–2014, Swoboda served as co-anchor of WKYC's weeknight 7 p.m. newscast.
- Liz Claman, served as anchor of the program from 1991 to 1995, is now an anchor/correspondent for the Fox Business Network.
