= Tim Taylor (newscaster) =

American journalist (born 1943)

- Born: Timothy Kropf; May 19, 1943 (age 82); Cleveland, Ohio, U.S.
- Occupation(s): TV / radio broadcaster, television news anchor, investigative reporter
- Years active: 1964–2005

Tim Taylor (born Timothy Kropf on May 19, 1943, in Cleveland, Ohio) is a retired American newscaster/investigative reporter and news anchor for FOX affiliate WJW-TV 8 in Cleveland, Ohio. Taylor served as the chief news anchor of WJW from 1977 to 2005.

== Early life ==
Taylor was born on the east side of Cleveland in the Buckeye neighborhood, moving at a young age to suburban Bedford, Ohio. Taylor suffered from bronchial asthma as a youngster, though he overcame it and graduated from Bedford High School in 1961, and going to college at Kent State University.

== Broadcast career ==
In 1964, Kropf took the name of Tim Taylor, and began his broadcasting career. The first ten years of Taylor's 30-plus-year career were spent in radio, including seven years as News Director of WHK Radio. It was there that Taylor earned recognition for his live coverage of such historic news events as the second Sam Shepard trial, the Hough Riots, the Glenville shootout, blastoff to splashdown live coverage of the aborted Apollo 13 mission and the Kent State shootings, for which he received an Emmy for his 25th anniversary perspective piece on the Kent State tragedy.

In 1974, Taylor moved to television, first joining WEWS channel 5 as a consumer reporter/weekend anchor. He moved to WJW three years later, and in 1979 became a co-anchor on the weeknight newscasts, a post he held until his retirement in December 2005.

While at WJW, Taylor did live reports from Three Mile Island, interviewed four presidents, and even traveled to Japan to cover the then growing Japanese auto industry.

== Awards and honors ==
- 1991 Ohio Broadcasters Hall of Fame inductee
- 1994 Lower Great Lakes Emmy Awards Silver Circle Award recipient
- 2001 Cleveland Association of Broadcasters Hall of Fame inductee
- 2002 Lower Great Lakes Emmy Awards recipient (as co-anchor of Fox 8 News at 10) - Outstanding Daily Newscast
- 2007 Cleveland Press Club Journalism Hall of Fame inductee
