= Zacchini v. Scripps-Howard Broadcasting Co. =

- Supreme Court of the United States

Argued April 25, 1977 Decided June 28, 1977
- Full case name: Hugo Zacchini v. Scripps-Howard Broadcasting Company
- Citations: 433 U.S. 562 (more) 97 S. Ct. 2849; 53 L. Ed. 2d 965; 1977 U.S. LEXIS 145; 205 U.S.P.Q. (BNA) 741; 40 Rad. Reg. 2d (P & F) 1485; 5 Ohio Op. 3d 215; 2 Media L. Rep. 2089

Case history
- Prior: Ohio Supreme Court, 47 Ohio St.2d 224, 351 N.E.2d 454 (1976), reversed; cert. granted 429 U.S. 1037 (1977)

Holding
- The First and Fourteenth Amendments do not immunize the news media from civil liability when they broadcast a performer's entire act without his consent, nor does the Constitution prevent a State from requiring broadcasters to compensate performers.

Court membership
- Chief Justice Warren E. Burger Associate Justices William J. Brennan Jr. · Potter Stewart; Byron White · Thurgood Marshall; Harry Blackmun · Lewis F. Powell Jr. William Rehnquist · John P. Stevens

Case opinions
- Majority: White, joined by Burger, Stewart, Blackmun, Rehnquist
- Dissent: Powell, joined by Brennan, Marshall
- Dissent: Stevens

Laws applied
- U.S. Const., Amends. I and XIV

Zacchini v. Scripps-Howard Broadcasting Co., 433 U.S. 562 (1977), was an important U.S. Supreme Court case concerning rights of publicity. The Court held that the First and Fourteenth Amendments do not immunize the news media from civil liability when they broadcast a performer's entire act without his consent, and the Constitution does not prevent a state from requiring broadcasters to compensate performers. It was the first time (and so far the only time) the Supreme Court heard a case on rights of publicity.

== Facts and procedural history ==
Petitioner Hugo Zacchini had a human cannonball act which he performed at various venues. During August 1972, he was performing his act at the Geauga County Fair in Burton, Ohio. On August 30, Zacchini noticed a freelance reporter from Scripps-Howard Broadcasting (which operated WEWS-TV in Cleveland) who had brought a movie camera into the fair. Zacchini asked the reporter not to film his act. The reporter did not film Zacchini's act that day, but did film him the next day. The footage taken by the reporter was about fifteen seconds long, sufficient to capture Zacchini's entire act.

Zacchini filed suit against Scripps-Howard in Ohio state court, alleging that the local reporter "showed and commercialized the film of his act without his consent," and that such conduct was an "unlawful appropriation of plaintiff's professional property." The trial court granted the defendant summary judgment. The Ohio Court of Appeals reversed, holding that Zacchini's complaint stated a cause of action for conversion and for infringement of a common law copyright, and that the press was not privileged to show Zacchini's entire act on television without compensating him.

The case was then heard by the Ohio Supreme Court, who reversed the judgment of the Court of Appeals in favor of Scripps-Howard. The Ohio Supreme Court held that although Scripps-Howard would be liable for appropriating Zacchini's name, likeness, and performance,

A TV station has a privilege to report in its newscasts matters of legitimate public interest which would otherwise be protected by an individual's right of publicity, unless the actual intent of the TV station was to appropriate the benefit of the publicity for some nonprivileged private use, or unless the actual intent was to injure the individual.

The U.S. Supreme Court granted certiorari to determine whether the First and Fourteenth Amendments immunized respondent from damages for its alleged infringement of Zacchini's right of publicity under Ohio state law.

== Decision ==
=== Majority opinion ===
Justice White wrote for the majority. He held first that, because the Ohio Supreme Court based its decision on the scope of protection offered to the press by the Federal constitution (rather than the Ohio state constitution), no adequate and independent state ground existed for the Ohio Supreme Court's decision, and the U.S. Supreme Court therefore had jurisdiction.

Moving on to the substantive constitutional issue of the case, White disagreed with the Ohio Supreme Court that the press should be privileged in showing Zacchini's entire act. He distinguished this case from Time, Inc. v. Hill, the U.S. Supreme Court case upon which the Ohio Supreme Court relied in their opinion. Time, Inc. v. Hill was a case which dealt with the tort of "false light", i.e. portraying a person in a misleading or embarrassing manner, rather than the appropriation of a performer's act or likeness, which was at stake there. White analogized Zacchini's interest in protecting his act from being shown without his permission to those interests protected by patent and copyright: Zacchini not only had a commercial interest in being compensated for the time and effort involved in his performance, but also the "economic incentive for him to make the investment required to produce a performance of interest to the public". White concluded by saying that while a state government may pass a law shielding the press from liability for broadcasting performers' acts, the First and Fourteenth amendments do not require the states to do so.

=== Dissenting opinions ===
Justice Powell, joined by justices Brennan and Marshall, disagreed with the standard set forth by the majority. Powell felt that the majority concentrated too heavily on the fact that the footage which was broadcast constituted Zacchini's "entire act" (which, Powell noted, was a rather uncertain standard in itself), rather than examining the purpose for which the footage was used. Since the footage was used for the purpose of reporting news, rather than for commercial exploitation, Powell asserted that the television station's use of the footage should be considered privileged from liability. He worried that the majority's holding may have a chilling effect on freedom of the press:

The Court's holding that the station's ordinary news report may give rise to substantial liability has disturbing implications, for the decision could lead to a degree of media self-censorship. Hereafter, whenever a television news editor is unsure whether certain film footage received from a camera crew might be held to portray an "entire act," he may decline coverage – even of clearly newsworthy events – or confine the broadcast to watered-down verbal reporting, perhaps with an occasional still picture. The public is then the loser. This is hardly the kind of news reportage that the First Amendment is meant to foster.

Justice Stevens wrote a separate dissent. He felt that a better resolution of the case would have been to remand it back to the Ohio Supreme Court for clarification of the state law issue before attempting to resolve the constitutional issue. Stevens felt that it was not clear whether the Ohio Supreme Court was basing its holding purely on the boundaries of common law torts or the First Amendment.
