= Pagnotta =

Pagnotta is a surname. Notable people with the surname include:

- Melissa Pagnotta (born 1988), Canadian taekwondo practitioner
- Tim Pagnotta (born 1977), American musician
