= Ildebrando Zacchini =

- Born: July 31, 1868; Pieve di Cento, Italy
- Died: July 17, 1948 (aged 79–80); Tampa, Florida
- Resting place: Myrtle Hill Memorial Park, Tampa
- Other names: Altebrando
- Known for: human cannonball act
- Spouse: Madelina Dal Paos (1872 – 1963)
- Children: Hugo Zacchini, Edmondo Zacchini

Ildebrando Zacchini (July 31, 1868 – July 17, 1948) was an Italian-born painter, inventor, and travelling circus owner.

Inspired by the works of Jules Verne, Zacchini came up with an idea for a human cannonball act. Instead of explosives, Zacchini's human-firing cannon used compressed air, and he first tested it on his son Hugo Zacchini.

The idea for the cannonball act was initially proposed to the Italian government as a military maneuver to be used in conjunction with parachutes; when the proposal was rejected Zacchini looked to use the technique as part of an entertainment act.

Zacchini died in Tampa, Florida in 1948. Members of the Zacchini family were later inducted into the Ringling Brothers Circus Hall of Fame.

== See also ==
- Edmondo Zacchini
- Human cannonball
