= Human cannonball =

Ejection of a human being from a specially designed cannon

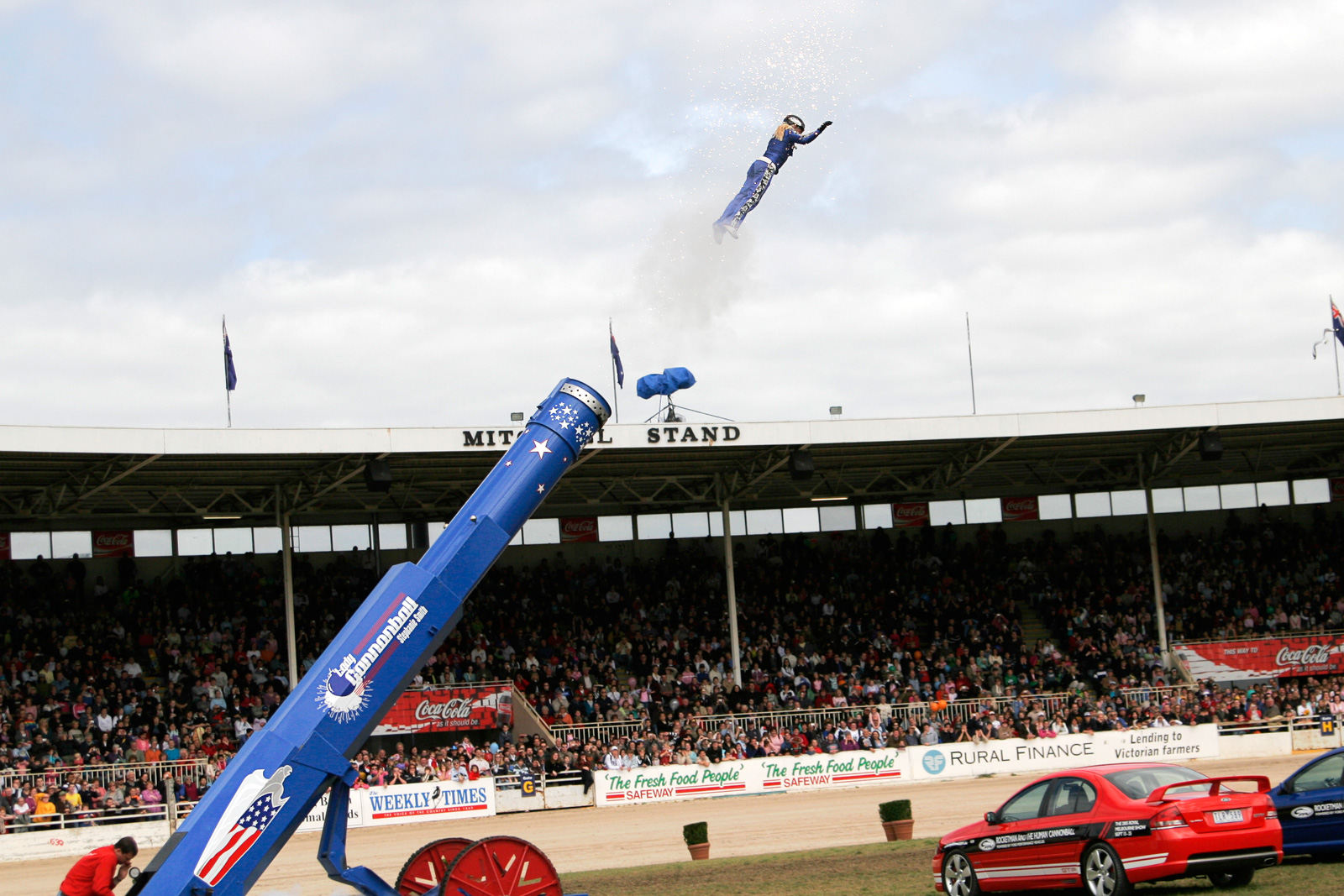
Stephanie Smith, human cannonball at the Royal Melbourne Show, 2005

The human cannonball act is a performance in which a person who acts as the "cannonball" is ejected from a cylinder that has been specially designed to resemble a cannon. The human cannonball lands on a horizontal net or inflated bag placed at the predicted landing point. Outdoor performances may aim at a body of water.

== History ==
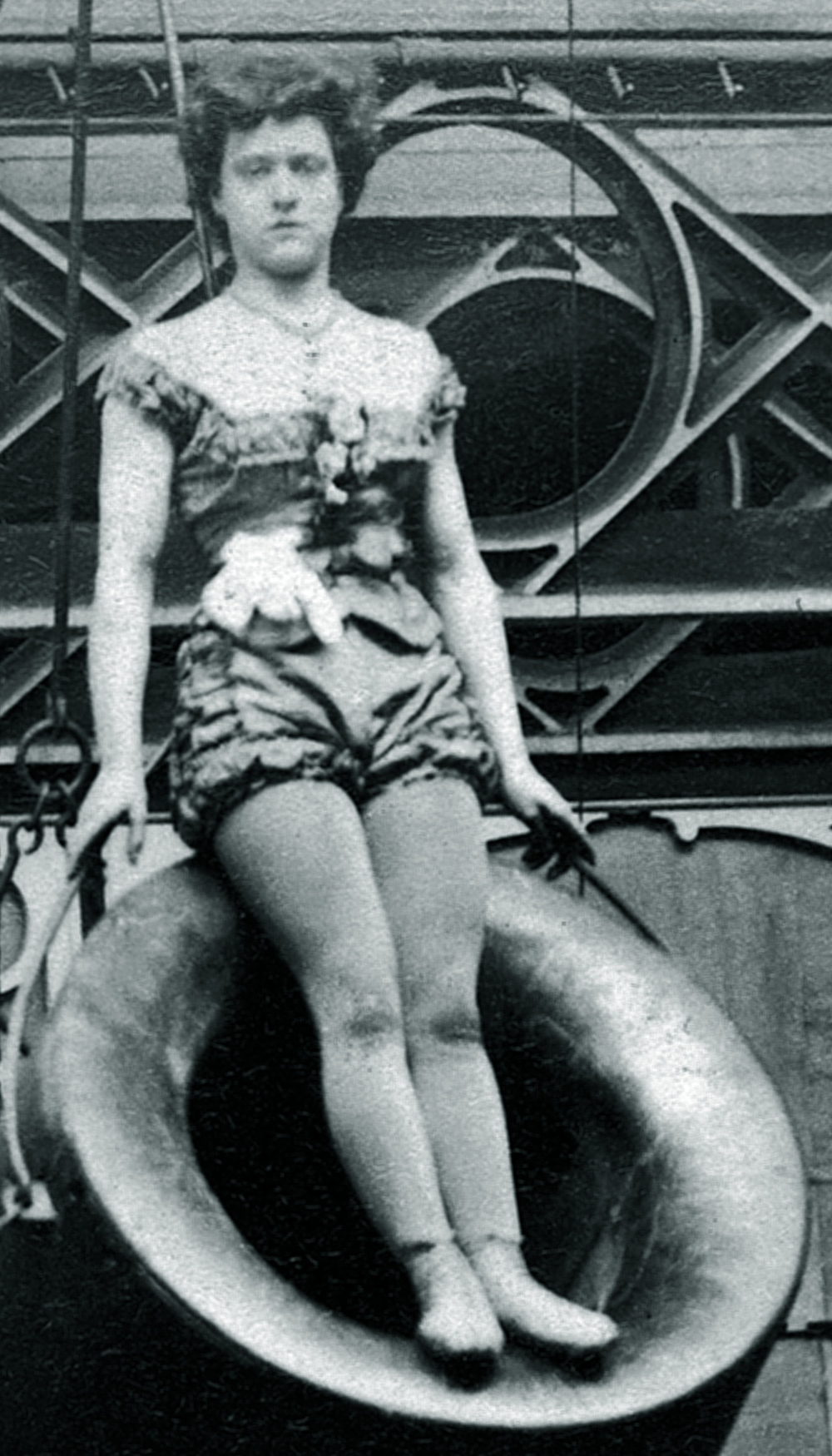
Rossa Matilda Richter ("Zazel") with her cannon in 1877.

William Leonard Hunt, known in the circus world as "The Great Farini", conceived and designed the basic act in the early 1870s, filing a patent for launching a human projectile in 1871. Hunt's cannon used rubber springs to launch a person from the cannon, limiting the distance they could be launched. His adopted son, Samuel Wasgate, was the first to perform as the human projectile, dressed in female clothing and billed as "Lulu" in an 1873 act referred to as the "Lulu Leap".

The first act billed as a "human cannonball", launched in 1877 at the Royal Aquarium in London using the same contraption used for the "Lulu Leap", was the 17-year-old Rossa Matilda Richter, going by the stage name "Zazel". Richter is often erroneously credited with being the first performer of the act. She later toured with the P.T. Barnum Circus. Richter's career as a human cannonball ended when she broke her back during an unrelated tightrope act.

During World War I, Ildebrando Zacchini proposed using spring-loaded cannons to shoot Italian soldiers across enemy lines, but the Italian government considered the plan too risky. In Cairo in 1922, Zacchini invented a cannon that used compressed air to launch a human. He first tested his new cannon with his son Bruno Zacchini, and after traveling back to Italy, Ringling Brothers scouts invited the Zacchini family to the United States. Members of the Zacchini family were later inducted into the Ringling Brothers Circus Hall of Fame.

== Cannon mechanics ==
The impetus in the cannon is provided either by a spring or jet of compressed air. This makes the device work more like a catapult, where the cylinder propelling the human stops at the mouth of the cannon. Some cannons utilize nitrocellulose, specifically the dinitrate ester, cellulose dinitrate (pyroxylin).

In a circus performance, gunpowder may be used to provide visual and auditory effects unrelated to the launching mechanism. Fireworks and smoke may also be used to increase the visual effect.

The largest retailer of these human cannons is located in Greensburg, Pennsylvania. This supplier provides approximately 80% of all human cannon catapults.

== World record ==
There is a claim that the current world record for the longest human cannonball flight is 193 ft 8.8 in (59.05 m), established by David "The Bullet" Smith Jr. on the set of Lo Show dei Record, in Milan, Italy, on March 10, 2011. The distance was measured from the mouth of the cannon to the farthest point reached on the net. Smith was launched by an 8 metres (26 ft 3 in) long cannon. It was estimated that he traveled at a speed of 120 km/h (75 mph), reaching a maximum altitude of 23 metres (75 ft 6 in).

There is, however, a contradictory claim that Smith's father, David "Cannonball" Smith Sr., set a record of 200 ft 4 in (61.06 m), on August 31, 2002, at The Steele County Free Fair, in Owatonna, Minnesota. It is estimated that Smith Sr. traveled at over 70 miles per hour (110 km/h) during the flight.

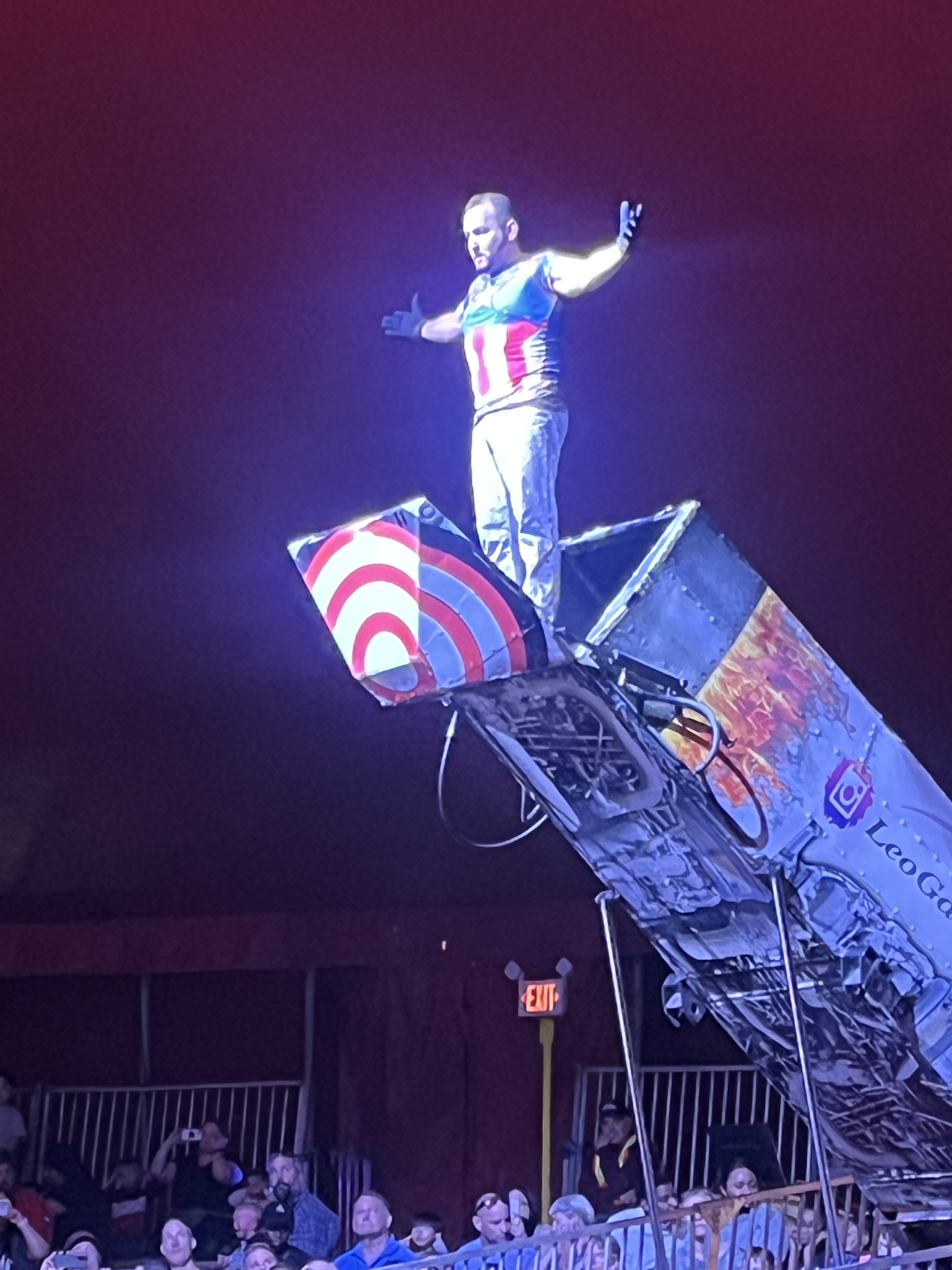
Leo Garcia is about to enter his cannon to be shot out

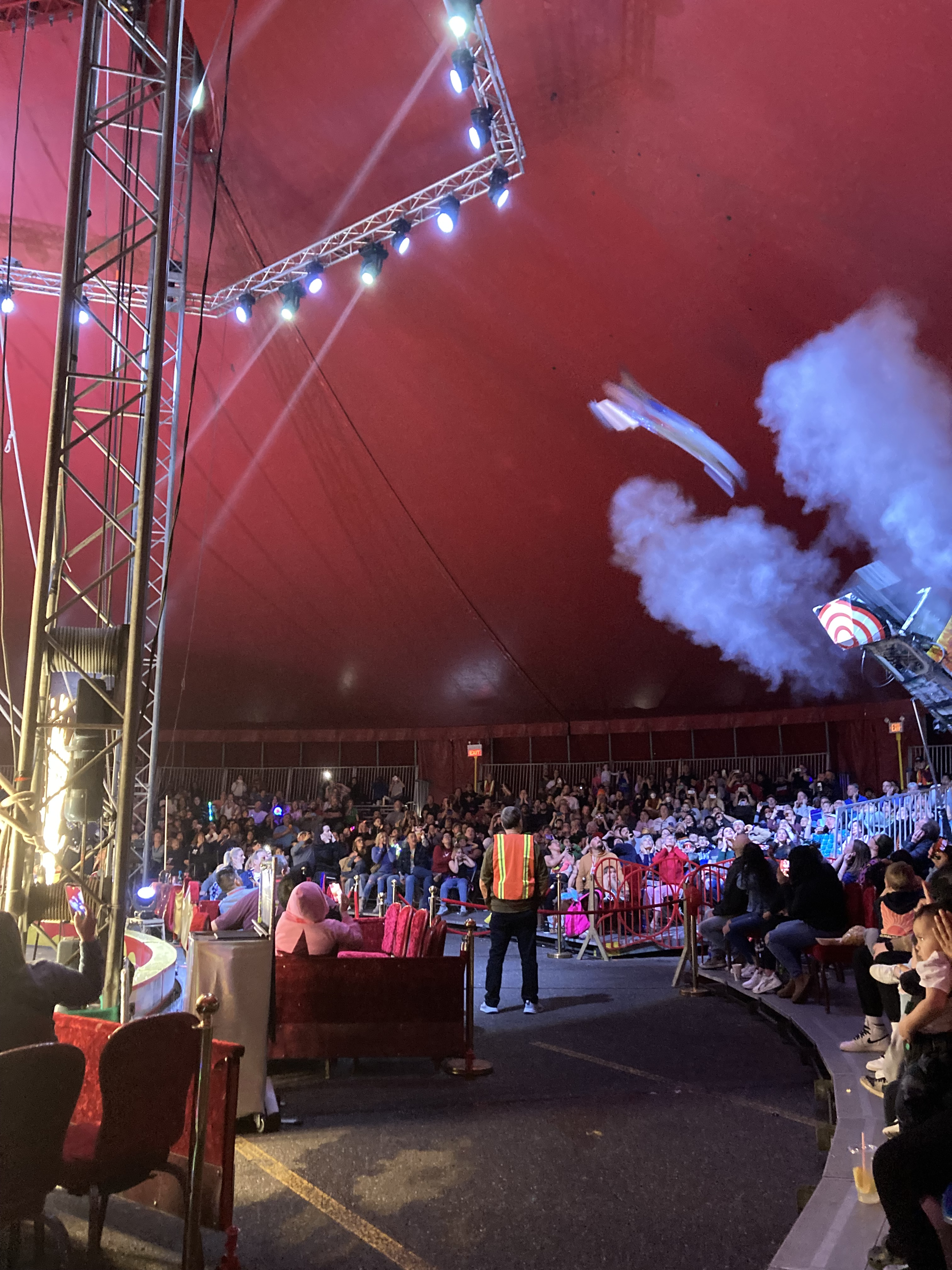
Instant after the performer, Leo Garcia, left his cannon

== Risk ==
More than 30 human cannonballs have died during the performance of this stunt. Among the latest was that which occurred in Kent, United Kingdom on April 25, 2011, where a human cannonball died as a result of the failure of the safety net. Landing is considered to be the most dangerous aspect of the act.

== Special forces ==
The human cannonball principle is the subject of a patent application by the US Defense Advanced Research Projects Agency, whereby a rail-guided chair driven by compressed air is brought to a sudden stop, propelling the special forces member, police officer or firefighter onto the roof of a tall building.

== See also ==
- Frank "Cannonball" Richards
- William Leonard Hunt
- Ildebrando Zacchini
- Zacchini v. Scripps-Howard Broadcasting Co.
- Cannonball ride – a plot device used for example in the tales about Baron Munchausen and in the 1911 film The Adventures of Pinocchio
- 'Human Cannonball' by Butthole Surfers from the album Locust Abortion Technician
