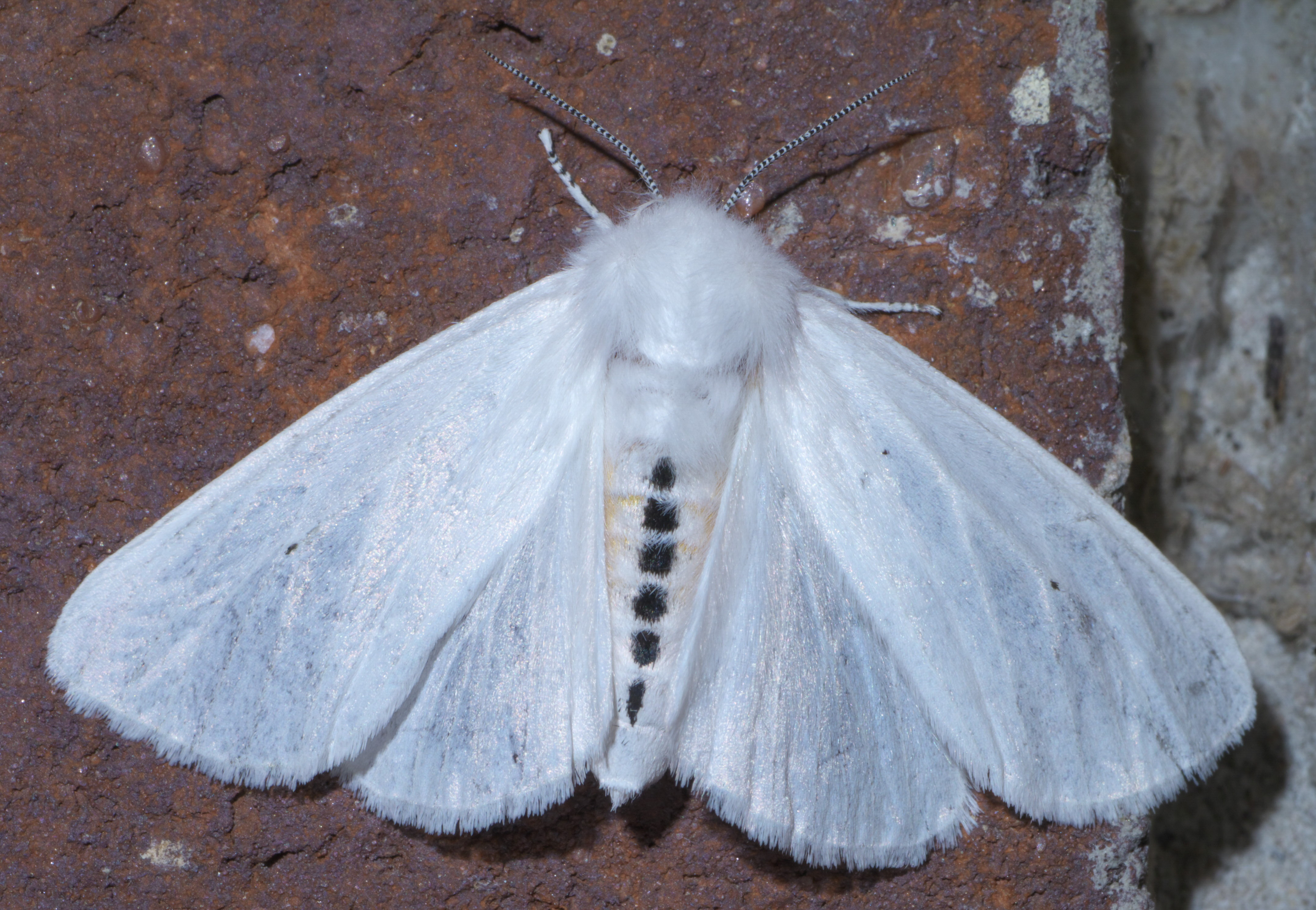

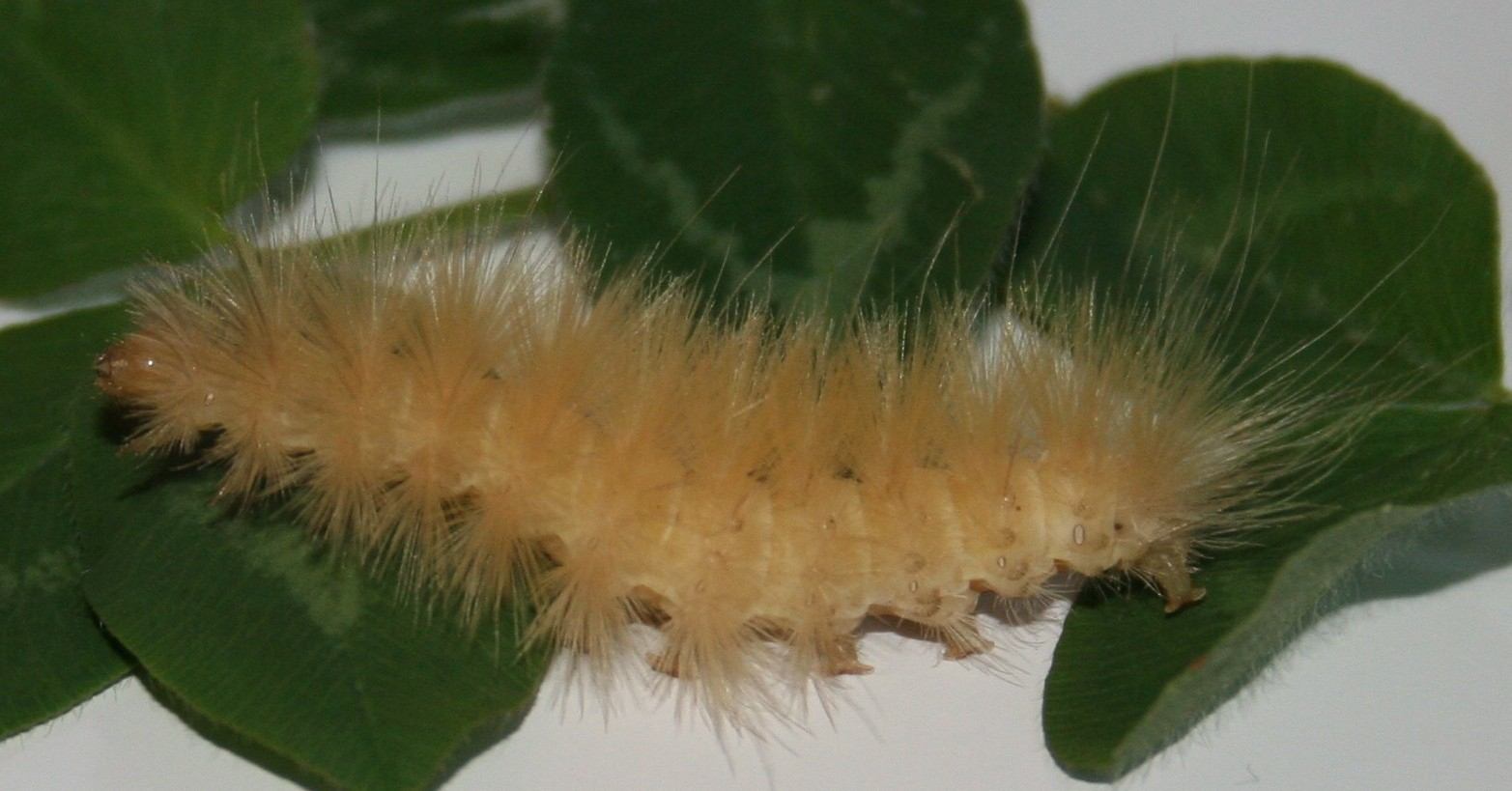
- adult (top) larva (bottom)

Scientific classification
- Kingdom: Animalia
- Phylum: Arthropoda
- Clade: Pancrustacea
- Class: Insecta
- Order: Lepidoptera
- Superfamily: Noctuoidea
- Family: Erebidae
- Subfamily: Arctiinae
- Tribe: Arctiini
- Subtribe: Spilosomina
- Genus: Spilosoma
- Species: S. virginica

Binomial name
- Spilosoma virginica Fabricius, 1798

Synonyms
- Diacrisia virginica (Fabricius, 1798); Spilosoma fumosa Strecker, 1900

= Spilosoma virginica =

Species of moth

Spilosoma virginica is a species of moth in the subfamily Arctiinae occurring in the United States and southern Canada. As a caterpillar, it is known as the yellow woolly bear or yellow bear caterpillar. As an adult, it is known as the Virginian tiger moth.

== Habitat and range ==
It is present throughout Northern America, but is more common in the Western half. The caterpillar is described as one of the most common on plantings about yards and gardens.

== Caterpillar life stage ==
=== Identification ===
The caterpillar varies in color but is typically consistent in its coloration in a single specimen, without odd tufts of different-colored hair or separately colored heads.

=== Diet ===
Yellow bear on milkweed.

It has a diet of a wide range of low-growing plants, including ground cover like grass and clover. The larvae are defoliators, skeletonizing the leaves they feed on, but only the late summer batch of caterpillars is plentiful enough to do much damage to crops. This species tends to have two to three life cycles per year, with one hibernating for the winter in temperate climates.

Yellow variation

== Adult moth life stage ==
The adult moth tends to tent its wings over its back, rather than sitting with them spread. It is white with a darker-colored abdomen, but without the obvious, darker eyes of its close cousin the agreeable tiger moth. It is not poisonous, but some people may have an allergic reaction to the bristles on its body.

== Reproduction ==
The female is slightly larger than the male in larva form, and as an adult finds a mate by extruding an organ that emits a pheromone which the male can smell. The male, which unlike the female has the large, feathered antennae characteristic of pheromone-using moths, flies zigzag search patterns, eventually homing in on a female. After mating, he goes off to find other females, while the female stops to lay between 20 and 100 eggs in a single layer on the underside of a leaf. The larvae stay together when very young, but become solitary as they gain size.

== See also ==
Woolly bear caterpillar
