= Green High School (Green, Ohio) =

Public school in Ohio, United States

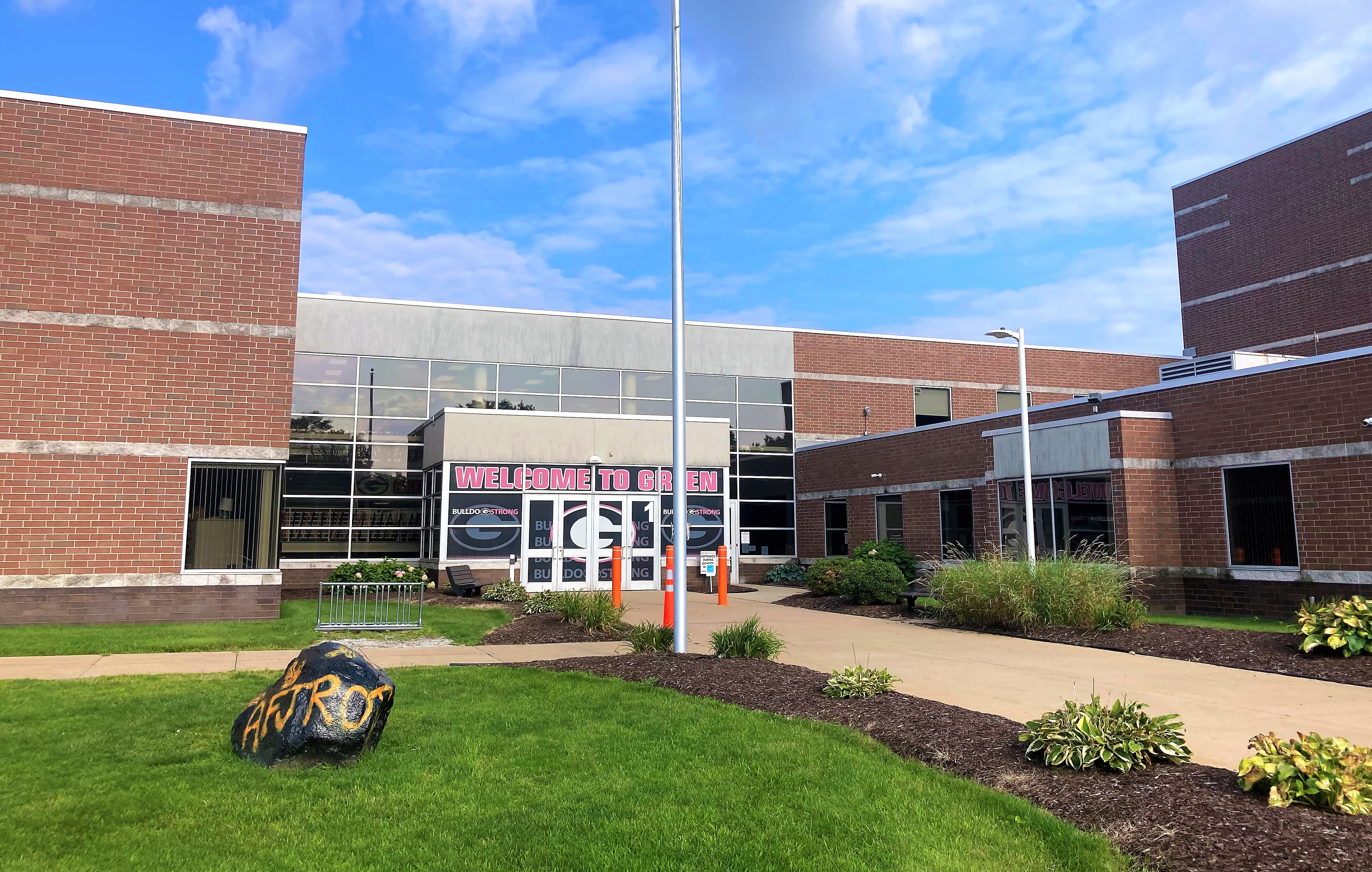

Location
- 1474 Boettler Road; Green, Ohio 44685; United States; 40°57′28″N 81°28′25″W

Information
- Type: Public
- Motto: "Making a Difference"
- School code: 365-140
- Principal: Cynthia Brown
- Faculty: 117
- Grades: 9–12
- Enrollment: 1,232 (2017–18)
- Colors: Orange and black
- Athletics conference: Federal League
- Team name: Bulldogs
- Rivals: Hoover High School (Ohio); Jackson High School; Tallmadge High School
- Publication: Bulldog Bite
- Newspaper: Paw Print
- Website: ghs.greenlocalschools.org

Green High School is a public high school in Green, Ohio, just south of Akron, Ohio. It is the only high school in the Green Local Schools. The school colors are orange and black, the athletic teams are known as the Bulldogs, and since 2015 have competed in the OHSAA's Federal League. The current facility opened in 1996.

== Administration ==
The current principal of Green High School is Cynthia Brown. Assistant Principals are Bill Bridenthal and Jeff Wells. The Athletic Director is Erich Muzi.

=== Advanced Placement ===
Offered by College Board, Advanced Placement courses are available in Green. According to US News, around 36% of students enroll in at least one AP course, while the average test taker completes 2.8 exams. The passage rate is much higher than the national average, and approximately 83% of students pass with a score of 3 or higher.

=== Clubs and activities ===
The school offers extracurricular activities and clubs, including the Academic Challenge Team, Art Club, Dance Club, Musical Theater, Chain Reaction, Select Choir, Women's Choir, Chess Club, Do Something club, Ensemble, Fellowship of Christian Students (FCS), Girls of Green, Jazz Orchestra, Jazz Ensemble, Key Club, marching band, mock trial, National Honor Society, Pep band, Pit Orchestra, Student Council, German Club, Spanish Club, and the yearbook. The school also participates in sports, including cheerleading, football, girls volleyball, boys/girls golf, boys/girls cross country, and boys/girls soccer during the fall. In the winter, the school offers girls gymnastics, wrestling, cheerleading, boys/girls basketball, boys/girls swimming, and boys/girls bowling. In the spring, the school offers boys/girls track, boys tennis, boys baseball, girls softball, and boys/girls lacrosse.

=== State championships ===
- Boys' Track & Field: 1986

In 1986, Green High School's track team won the Boys AAA track and field state championship. Future Olympian Mark Croghan was a senior at the time, and captured a state championship in the cross-country, 1600, and 3200 events.

== Demographics ==
Approximately 92% of students are white, while the rest are African American (2%), Asian or Pacific Islander (3%), Hispanic (1.2%), and Multiracial (3%), American Indian or Alaskan Native (0.2%). Students with disabilities make up around 10.5% of the student body. About 18% of students are eligible for either free or reduced lunch programs. 21% are classified as economically disadvantaged. Males make up slightly more than half of the student body with 53%, while 47% of the students are females. There are roughly 19 students per teacher. Ninety six percent of students graduate from Green in four years and 95.3% graduate in 5 years. The average daily enrollment for the 2018-2019 school year was 1,272. The total minority enrollment was 8% and the total economically disadvantaged enrollment was 21%. students.

== School rankings ==
According to the U.S. News & World Report, Green High School was ranked 77th of public schools in Ohio for the 2018-2019 school year and 1,876th in the United States. US News awarded Green High School with a silver medal.

== Notable alumni ==
- Mark Croghan, U.S. Olympian in steeplechase
- Christian DiLauro, professional football player
- Dick Goddard, meteorologist for WJW, author, cartoonist, animal rights activist, and holder of the Guinness World Record for the longest career as a weather forecaster
- Heather Kozar, 1999 Playboy Playmate of the Year and wife of ex-Cleveland Browns quarterback Tim Couch
- David Lough, professional baseball player
- Maxwell Moldovan, golfer
