= 2000 Summit County, Ohio Executive election =

- November 7, 2000

Nominee	James McCarthy	Don Robart
Party	Democratic	Republican
Popular vote	119,172	87,720
Percentage	57.60%	42.40%
County Executive before election
Tim Davis
Democratic
Elected County Executive
James McCarthy
Democratic

The 2000 Summit County, Ohio Executive election was held on November 7, 2000. Incumbent Democratic County Executive Tim Davis, who was under federal investigation over bribery allegations, declined to seek re-election to a fourth term. Two candidates ran to succeed him in the Democratic primary: County Auditor James McCarthy and former Akron City Councilman Warner Mendenhall. McCarthy defeated Mendenhall in a landslide, receiving 79 percent of the vote, and advanced to the general election, where he was opposed by Cuyahoga Falls Mayor Don Robart, the Republican nominee. McCarthy defeated Robart by a wide margin, winning 58 percent of the vote to Robart's 42 percent.

== Democratic primary ==
=== Candidates ===
- James McCarthy, County Auditor
- Warner Mendenhall, former Akron City Councilman

==== Disqualified ====
- Bill Davis, Green retiree, 1996 Democratic candidate for County Executive

==== Declined ====
- Paul Gallagher, County Councilman

=== Results ===
Democratic primary results
Party	Candidate	Votes	%
Democratic	James McCarthy	34,754	79.25%
Democratic	Warner Mendenhall	9,100	20.75%
Total votes		43,854	100.00%

== Republican primary ==
=== Candidates ===
- Don Robart, Mayor of Cuyahoga Falls

==== Declined ====
- Deborah Owens Fink, member of the Ohio State Board of Education

=== Results ===
Republican primary results
Party	Candidate	Votes	%
Republican	Don Robart	37,866	100.00%
Total votes		37,866	100.00%

== General election ==
=== Results ===
2000 Summit County Executive election
Party	Candidate	Votes	%
Democratic	James McCarthy	119,172	57.60%
Republican	Don Robart	87,720	42.40%
Total votes		206,892	100.00%
Democratic hold			
