= Pyrrharctia genini =

Scientific classification
- Domain: Eukaryota
- Kingdom: Animalia
- Phylum: Arthropoda
- Class: Insecta
- Order: Lepidoptera
- Superfamily: Noctuoidea
- Family: Erebidae
- Subfamily: Arctiinae
- Genus: Pyrrharctia
- Species: P. genini

Binomial name
- Pyrrharctia genini (Debauche, 1938)

Synonyms
- Spilosoma genini Debauche, 1938; Pyrrharctia isabella (Smith, 1797)

Species of moth

Pyrrharctia genini is a moth in the family Erebidae. It was described by Hubert Robert Debauche in 1938. It is found in Mexico.
