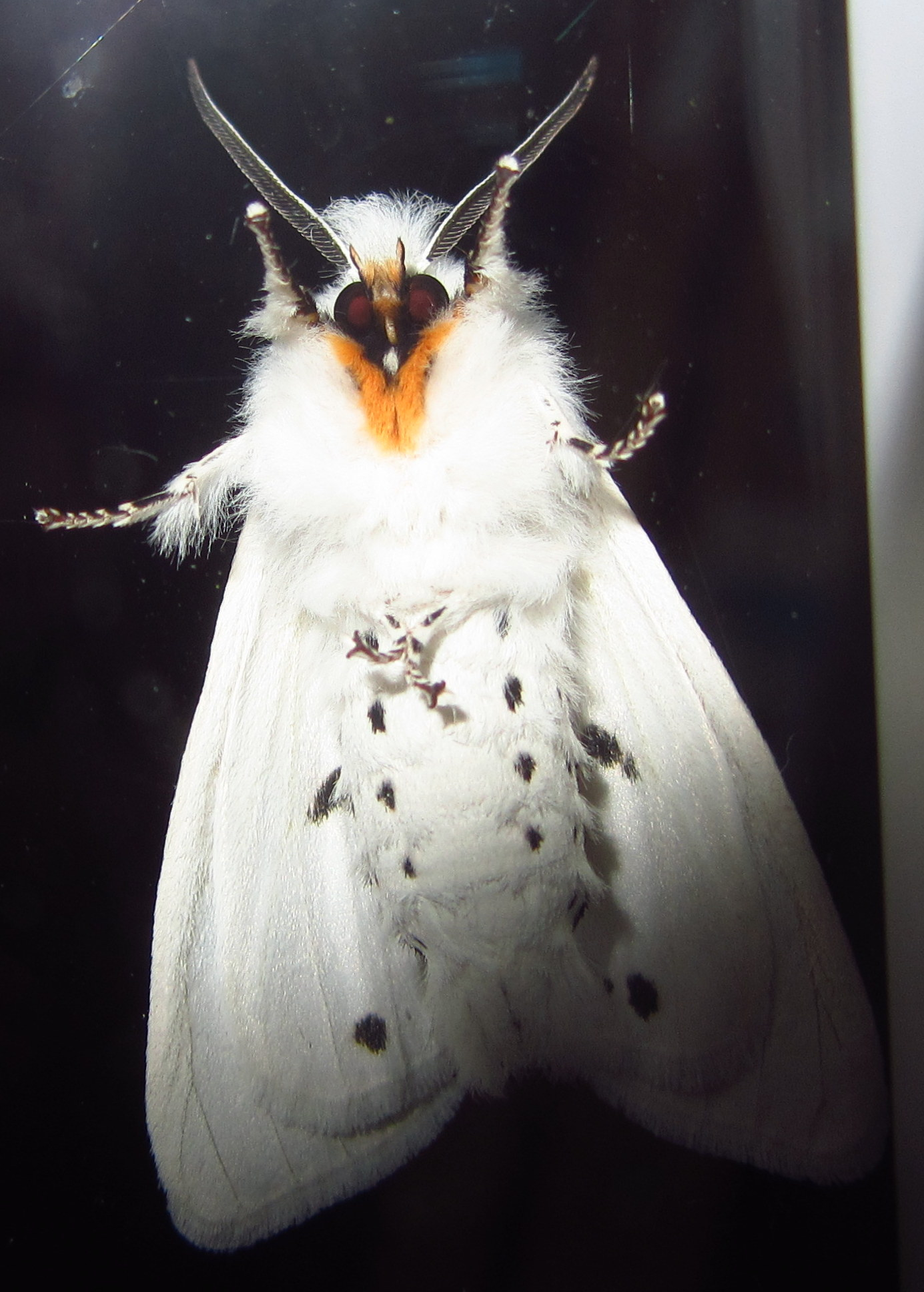
- Adult agreeable tiger moth, showing characteristic black eyes and orange "bib"
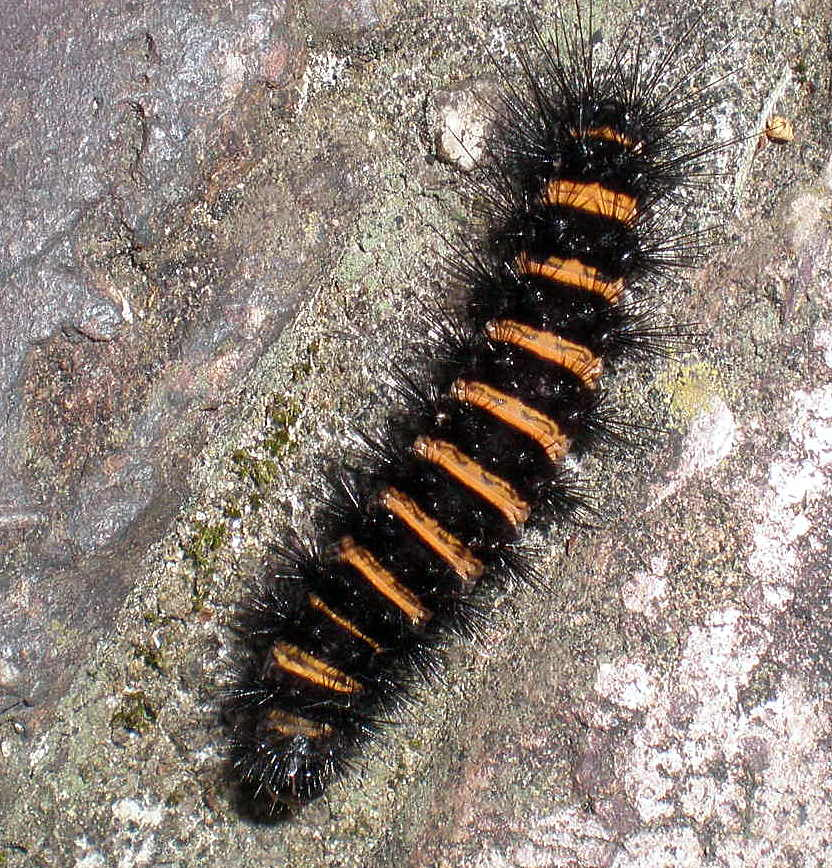
- Adult (top) and larva (bottom) illustrated in a 19th century plate

Scientific classification
- Kingdom: Animalia
- Phylum: Arthropoda
- Clade: Pancrustacea
- Class: Insecta
- Order: Lepidoptera
- Superfamily: Noctuoidea
- Family: Erebidae
- Subfamily: Arctiinae
- Genus: Spilosoma
- Species: S. congrua

Binomial name
- Spilosoma congrua Walker, 1855

Synonyms
- Spilosoma congrua var. bimaculata Stretch, 1906; Spilosoma congrua var. flavofrons Neumoegen & Dyar, 1893; Spilosoma congrua var. maculifrons Stretch, 1906; Spilosoma congrua var. nigrifrons Stretch, 1906; Spilosoma congrua var. rubrofrons Packard, 1864; Spilosoma congrua ab. fuscipennis Strand, 1919; Spilosoma congrua ab. hyalinipennis Strand, 1919; Diacrisia congrua (Walker, 1855); Spilosoma spesnova Smith, 1985

= Agreeable tiger moth =

Species of moth

The agreeable tiger moth (Spilosoma congrua) is a medium-sized moth belonging to the family Erebidae, subfamily Arctiinae, commonly known as the tiger moths. It was first described by the British entomologist Francis Walker in 1855 and is one of the most common white tiger moths found in North America. The species is easily recognised by its bright white wings, pronounced black eyes, white abdomen with rows of black spots, and a distinctive orange or yellow "bib" on the thorax just behind the head. These features separate it from its close relatives, the Virginia tiger moth (Spilosoma virginica) and the dubious tiger moth (Spilosoma dubia).

The agreeable tiger moth ranges across most of the contiguous United States, southern Canada, and there is some evidence of disjunct populations in India. It inhabits open woodlands, meadows, fields, roadsides, and suburban gardens. The larvae are generalist feeders, consuming a wide variety of herbaceous plants, including many common weeds and garden vegetables, which sometimes brings the species into mild conflict with agriculture. Adults are nocturnal and are attracted to lights. The species has one to three generations per year depending on latitude and climate.

== Taxonomy and nomenclature ==
=== Original description ===
Francis Walker, a prolific but sometimes careless describer of insects, named Spilosoma congrua in the fifth volume of his "List of the Specimens of Lepidopterous Insects in the Collection of the British Museum", published in 1855. The holotype, a female specimen, was part of the extensive collections assembled by naturalists in the eastern United States and sent to London. Walker gave a brief Latin diagnosis, noting the white colour of the wings, the black spotting of the abdomen, and the ochreous tint of the head and front of the thorax. The precise type locality was not recorded, but the specimen almost certainly originated from the northeastern United States, probably New York or New Jersey.

=== Etymology ===
The generic name Spilosoma is derived from the Greek words spilos (a spot, stain, or blemish) and soma (body), referring to the spotted abdomen characteristic of many members of the genus. The specific epithet congrua is Latin for "agreeable", "congruous", or "fitting". The precise reason for Walker's choice of this name is unknown. It may refer to the pleasing symmetry of the black spots on the white body, or it may simply have been an arbitrary choice from the vocabulary of descriptive Latin terms. The common name "agreeable tiger moth" directly translates the scientific name and was adopted by early 20th century American entomologists. The alternative name "New Hope tiger moth" derives from a later synonym, Spilosoma spesnova, where spes nova means "new hope" in Latin. This name was proposed by Smith in 1985 for what was thought to be a separate species, but was later synonymised.

=== Classification within the Arctiinae ===
The tiger moths (Arctiinae) are a large and diverse subfamily of the Erebidae. Within the Arctiinae, Spilosoma congrua belongs to the tribe Arctiini and the subtribe Spilosomina, which includes many of the familiar white and spotted tiger moths. The genus Spilosoma contains approximately 200 species worldwide, with about 20 occurring in North America. Molecular phylogenetic studies have not fully resolved the relationships within the North American white tiger moths, but S. congrua is clearly distinct from its sympatric congeners based on both genetic and morphological evidence.

=== Subspecies and variation ===
Several varieties and aberrations have been named, but none are currently recognised as valid subspecies. These colour forms include:

- bimaculata Stretch, 1906 – with two black spots instead of one on each forewing.
- flavofrons Neumoegen & Dyar, 1893 – with a yellow frons (front of head) instead of white.
- maculifrons Stretch, 1906 – with a heavily spotted frons.
- nigrifrons Stretch, 1906 – with a black frons.
- rubrofrons Packard, 1864 – with a reddish frons.
- fuscipennis Strand, 1919 – with smoky brown wings.
- hyalinipennis Strand, 1919 – with translucent wings.

These names represent minor individual variations and are not considered to have taxonomic standing. The degree of spotting on the abdomen and the intensity of the orange bib also vary among individuals and populations.

== Physical description ==
=== Adult ===
The adult agreeable tiger moth is a medium-sized macrolepidopteran. The wingspan ranges from 28 to 42 millimetres, with females usually slightly larger than males. The forewings are pure white, occasionally with a faint cream or yellowish tint along the costa. A small black spot or dot is present on the disc of each forewing, although it is sometimes faint or absent. The hindwings are white and unmarked. The wing shape is typical of the genus: the forewings are elongate and somewhat triangular, the hindwings rounded.

The head is small, with large, compound black eyes that are a distinctive feature. The antennae are filiform (thread-like) in the female and bipectinate (comb-like on both sides) in the male, a sexually dimorphic character common in moths. The frons (front of the head) is usually white, but as noted above, may be yellow, red, or black in some individuals. The labial palps are short and porrect (projecting forward).

The thorax is white, with a prominent patch of orange, ochreous, or yellow setae (hair-like scales) on the anterior part, just behind the head. This orange "bib" is the most reliable field mark for separating the species from the Virginia tiger moth, which has a white thorax. The underside of the thorax is white. The legs are white with black bands on the femora and tibiae.

The abdomen is white, with a dorsal row of black spots, one on each segment. There are also lateral rows of black spots on the sides of the abdomen. The number and size of the spots are variable, and some individuals are more heavily spotted than others. The tip of the abdomen in the female bears a tuft of white setae used to cover the egg mass.

=== Egg ===
The egg is spherical, about 0.6 mm in diameter, and pale yellow when first laid, darkening to grey before hatching. The surface is smooth and shiny under low magnification. Eggs are laid in clusters on the underside of host plant leaves, usually in batches of 20 to 100. A single female may lay several hundred eggs over her lifetime.

=== Larva ===
The larva of the agreeable tiger moth is the well-known "woolly bear" type, covered in dense setae (bristles). The first instar larvae are small (about 2 mm) and pale yellow, with sparse, short setae. As they grow and moult through successive instars (usually five to seven), they become darker and more densely hairy.

The mature caterpillar is about 30 to 35 mm long. The body is dark brown to black, covered in tufts of stiff, dark brown or black setae. Among these dark setae are interspersed shorter, paler setae, giving the caterpillar a somewhat frosted appearance. The head is small, black, and shiny. The prolegs are well developed. When disturbed, the caterpillar curls into a tight ball, a defensive behaviour typical of many arctiine larvae.

The colour and density of the setae can vary somewhat depending on the host plant and environmental conditions. Caterpillars raised on a diet rich in certain plant compounds may have slightly different colouration, though detailed studies on this are lacking.

=== Pupa ===
The pupa is about 15 mm long, dark brown to black, and smooth. It is enclosed in a loose cocoon of silk mixed with the caterpillar's own shed setae. The cocoon is usually constructed in leaf litter, under loose bark, or in a crevice. The pupal stage lasts 10 to 21 days in the summer generations. In the overwintering generation, the pupa enters diapause and may remain dormant for several months.

== Distribution ==
=== North America ===
The agreeable tiger moth is widely distributed across the United States and southern Canada. In the United States, it occurs from Maine south to Florida, and west to Texas, Oklahoma, Kansas, Nebraska, and the Dakotas. It is also recorded from Colorado, Wyoming, and Montana, though it is less common in the arid western states. It occurs throughout the Midwest and the Great Lakes region. In the Pacific Northwest, it is absent or very rare.

In Canada, the species is found in Ontario, Quebec, New Brunswick, Nova Scotia, and possibly Manitoba and Saskatchewan, though northern records are sparse. The northern limit of its range appears to be determined by climate, with the species absent from the boreal forest and tundra regions.

=== Possible occurrence in India ===
There is a record of Spilosoma congrua from India in the Barcode of Life Data System (BOLD). This record requires verification. It may represent a misidentification, a recent introduction, or a natural disjunct population. The genus Spilosoma is well represented in the Oriental region, and several Asian species closely resemble S. congrua in appearance. Careful morphological and molecular comparison is needed to determine whether the Indian records truly belong to this species or to a closely related Asian taxon. As of 2025, no published study has definitively resolved this question.

== Habitat ==
The agreeable tiger moth inhabits a wide range of open and semi-open habitats. It is most common in:

- Old fields and meadows
- Roadsides and railway verges
- Forest edges and clearings
- Suburban gardens and parks
- Abandoned agricultural land
- Wetlands and marshes edges

The species avoids dense, closed-canopy forest and extremely arid deserts, although it may occur in riparian corridors through otherwise unsuitable terrain. The key requirement for habitat suitability is the presence of herbaceous host plants for the larvae.

In urban and suburban areas, the agreeable tiger moth is often one of the more commonly observed white moths at porch lights. It tolerates moderate levels of habitat disturbance and may benefit from the proliferation of weedy host plants in human-modified environments.

== Life cycle and development ==
=== Voltinism ===
The number of generations per year (voltinism) varies with latitude and climate. In the northern parts of its range (Canada, northern New England, the Great Lakes), the species is univoltine, producing a single generation per year. In the mid-Atlantic and midwestern states, it is bivoltine, with two generations. In the deep South, from the Carolinas to Texas and Florida, it may be trivoltine, with three overlapping generations in a long growing season. In southern Florida and the Gulf Coast, adults may be found in nearly every month of the year.

=== Adult activity ===
Adults are primarily nocturnal. They fly from dusk until the early hours of the morning, with peak activity between 10 PM and 2 AM. Males are strong fliers and may travel considerable distances in search of females. Females are heavier and less active, usually remaining close to the site of emergence until they have mated and laid most of their eggs.

Adults are attracted to artificial lights, a behaviour that makes them easy to observe at porch lights, street lamps, and moth sheets used by entomologists. They rest during the day on tree trunks, under leaves, or on walls, where their white colour provides excellent camouflage against light-coloured surfaces.

=== Mating ===
Mating occurs on the night of emergence or the following night. Females release a pheromone from a gland at the tip of the abdomen to attract males. The chemical composition of the pheromone has not been fully characterised for this species, but in related Spilosoma species, it typically consists of polyunsaturated hydrocarbons and their derivatives. Males detect the pheromone with their large, feathery antennae and fly upwind to locate the female. Copulation lasts for one to several hours.

=== Oviposition ===
After mating, the female searches for suitable host plants on which to lay her eggs. She uses olfactory and tactile cues to identify appropriate plants. The eggs are deposited in clusters on the underside of leaves, glued to the surface with a sticky secretion. A single female may lay 200 to 600 eggs over several nights. The female dies soon after oviposition is complete.

=== Egg development ===
Eggs hatch in 5 to 10 days, depending on temperature. The developing larva can be seen through the translucent eggshell as hatching approaches. The first instar larvae chew their way out of the egg and immediately begin feeding on the leaf surface.

=== Larval development ===
Larvae pass through five to seven instars over a period of 4 to 6 weeks, depending on temperature, food quality, and photoperiod. The early instars are gregarious, feeding together on the same leaf. Later instars become solitary and disperse across the host plant or to neighbouring plants.

The larvae feed primarily at night and rest on the undersides of leaves or on stems during the day. They consume leaf tissue, leaving characteristic holes and notches. When food is scarce, they may feed on flowers, developing fruits, and stems.

=== Overwintering ===
The species overwinters as a pupa in diapause. In the autumn, the mature larva ceases feeding, wanders for a day or two in search of a sheltered site, and spins its cocoon. The cocoon is constructed of silk mixed with the caterpillar's own shed setae, forming a tough, protective case. The pupa inside undergoes metabolic changes that allow it to survive freezing temperatures. Diapause is broken by prolonged exposure to cold temperatures, followed by warming in the spring. In the spring, the adult moth emerges from the pupa, chews its way out of the cocoon, and climbs to a suitable perch to expand and dry its wings.

== Host plants ==
The larvae of the agreeable tiger moth are highly polyphagous, feeding on a wide variety of plants from many different families. This generalist feeding habit is typical of the Spilosomina and has contributed to the species' success across diverse habitats.

Documented host plants include:

- Asteraceae: dandelion (Taraxacum), goldenrod (Solidago), ragweed (Ambrosia), sunflowers (Helianthus), asters (Symphyotrichum), thistles (Cirsium), and many others.
- Plantaginaceae: plantains (Plantago major, P. lanceolata).
- Polygonaceae: docks and sorrels (Rumex), smartweeds (Persicaria), knotweeds (Polygonum).
- Fabaceae: clovers (Trifolium), vetches (Vicia), soybeans (Glycine max).
- Brassicaceae: cabbages, mustards, and many wild crucifers.
- Apiaceae: wild carrot (Daucus carota), parsnips (Pastinaca).
- Lamiaceae: mints (Mentha), dead-nettles (Lamium).
- Solanaceae: tomatoes, potatoes, eggplants, and various nightshades.
- Chenopodiaceae: lamb's quarters (Chenopodium album), beets, spinach.
- Poaceae: various grasses, including corn (Zea mays), though grasses are less preferred.

The larvae also feed on numerous ornamental plants and garden vegetables, and they are occasionally reported as minor pests in soybean fields and vegetable gardens. However, because they occur at relatively low densities compared to agricultural pest species like the fall armyworm or the corn earworm, their economic impact is usually negligible.

== Behaviour and ecology ==
=== Defensive adaptations ===
Tiger moths are famous for their chemical defenses, and the agreeable tiger moth is no exception. Like many arctiines, the larvae sequester secondary plant compounds, including alkaloids and cardiac glycosides, from their host plants. These compounds are retained through metamorphosis and are present in the adult moth, making both larvae and adults distasteful to vertebrate predators such as birds, bats, and small mammals.

The bright, aposematic colouration of the adult (white with contrasting black spots and orange bib) serves as a warning to visual predators. The orange bib is particularly striking and may function as a signal of unpalatability. When handled, adults may feign death, dropping to the ground and remaining motionless.

The larvae also possess chemical defenses, which they advertise with their dense, dark setae. The setae themselves are not urticating (stinging) in this species, unlike some other tiger moths (e.g., the hickory tussock moth), but they may provide a degree of mechanical protection against small parasitoids and predators.

=== Acoustic behaviour ===
Many tiger moths, including species in the genus Spilosoma, possess tympanal organs on the thorax that allow them to detect the ultrasonic echolocation calls of bats, their primary nocturnal predators. When exposed to ultrasound, these moths may exhibit evasive flight manoeuvres, such as diving, spiralling, or dropping to the ground. Some arctiines also produce their own ultrasonic clicks in response to bat calls, which are thought to jam the bat's echolocation or to warn the bat of the moth's unpalatability. Whether S. congrua engages in such acoustic aposematism has not been studied, but it is plausible given that the behaviour is widespread in the subfamily.

=== Predators ===
Despite their chemical defenses, larvae and adults of the agreeable tiger moth are preyed upon by a variety of animals. Parasitoid wasps and flies are the most significant enemies of the larvae. Tachinid flies (family Tachinidae) and braconid wasps (family Braconidae) lay their eggs on or inside the caterpillar. The parasitoid larva consumes the caterpillar from within, eventually killing it just before pupation. Rates of parasitism can be high, particularly in late summer.

Birds, including blue jays, American robins, and Eastern bluebirds, are known to take adult moths despite their unpalatability. Spiders, particularly orb-weavers, also capture adults that fly into their webs. Bats are probably the most important predators of flying adults, though the degree of bat predation is hard to quantify.

=== Role in pollination ===
Adult agreeable tiger moths do not feed on nectar as intensively as some other moths, but they may visit flowers for moisture and possibly nectar. Their relatively short proboscis limits them to shallow flowers, and they are not considered major pollinators. However, incidental pollination likely occurs as they move among plants in search of mates and oviposition sites.

== Similar species ==
The agreeable tiger moth is one of a group of three white Spilosoma species that are commonly encountered in eastern North America. Correct identification requires careful attention to a few key characters.

=== Virginia tiger moth (Spilosoma virginica) ===
The Virginia tiger moth is extremely similar and often confused with S. congrua. The most reliable field mark is the colour of the thorax: in S. virginica, the thorax is pure white, whereas in S. congrua, it is white with an orange or yellow "bib" just behind the head. The abdomen of S. virginica is white with black spots, but the spots are often fewer and less pronounced than in S. congrua. The eyes of S. virginica are black, as in S. congrua. The larvae of the two species are virtually indistinguishable in the field.

=== Dubious tiger moth (Spilosoma dubia) ===
The dubious tiger moth is somewhat smaller and has a more northerly distribution, being common in Canada and the northern United States. It has a yellowish or pale orange thorax and abdomen, with fewer and less distinct black spots. The overall appearance is more uniformly pale yellow or cream, whereas S. congrua is a starker white. The wings of S. dubia often have a slightly translucent quality.

=== Other white moths ===
Several other white moths, including the fall webworm moth (Hyphantria cunea) and various geometer moths, may be mistaken for tiger moths by casual observers. These can be distinguished by their smaller size, different resting posture, or the absence of abdominal spots.

== Economic importance ==
The agreeable tiger moth is not a significant agricultural pest. Larvae occasionally feed on soybeans, corn, and garden vegetables, but they rarely reach densities that cause economic damage. In most years and at most locations, the species is a benign component of the herbivore community. The larvae may, if anything, be considered beneficial because they feed on common weeds such as dandelions and plantains. No specific control measures are recommended or needed for this species.

== Conservation status ==
The agreeable tiger moth has not been assessed by the International Union for Conservation of Nature (IUCN). In the United States and Canada, it is not listed under any federal or state endangered species legislation. Given its wide distribution, broad habitat tolerance, and generalist feeding habits, the species is considered secure and is not of conservation concern. Populations may fluctuate from year to year due to weather, parasitism, and food availability, but there is no evidence of a long-term decline.

== Research and studies ==
Compared to some other tiger moths, Spilosoma congrua has received relatively little dedicated research attention. Most published information comes from regional faunal surveys, taxonomic works, and ecological studies of the Arctiinae as a group. DNA barcoding studies using the mitochondrial cytochrome c oxidase subunit I (COI) gene have confirmed its distinctness from other North American Spilosoma species and have revealed some genetic structure across its range.

Potential areas for future research include the chemistry of the adult pheromone, the acoustic behaviour in response to bats, the sequestration of host plant compounds, and the population genetics of the disjunct Indian population, if confirmed.
