= Rachel Cargle =

American social justice activist, speaker, and author

Rachel Elizabeth Cargle
- Born: Green, Ohio, U.S.
- Education: University of Toledo; Columbia University
- Known for: Founder of the Loveland Foundation
- Website: www.rachelcargle.com

Rachel Cargle is an American social justice activist, public speaker, and author.

== Early life and education ==
Cargle was raised in Green, Ohio by her mother, who has polio. Her father died when she was young. Cargle and her mother lived in Section 8 housing in a wealthy suburb, which she stated made her aware of economic differences between herself and her white peers.

After graduating high school, Cargle served in the Air National Guard for six years. She cites her time in the military as making her "more critical about these organizations and not automatically trusting that they're serving the people."

She attended the University of Toledo for two years, studying anthropology and sociology before moving to Washington, D.C. at the age of 23. Cargle later attended Columbia University but decided to leave before graduating in response to an April 2019 incident in which a black male student was followed by university police after declining to present his student identification upon request. Cargle said: “I couldn’t stomach paying the university money anymore.”

== Career and activism ==
In 2017, a photo of Cargle and her friend holding signs at the 2017 Women's March went viral; Cargle's sign read, "If You Don’t Fight for All Women You Fight for No Women." The photo brought Cargle national attention and praise for her messaging.

Cargle began to learn more about feminist issues, and later spoke at several universities with her popular lecture series titled "Unpacking White Feminism". Cargle has fought to promote Intersectionality in her lectures and work." Layla Saad has stated that Cargle is more willing than some activists to engage in debate and thereby educate her social media followers. Mainly focused on anti-racism activism, Cargle's Instagram account grew from 355,000 to 1.7 million followers in the years since 2016.

After a GoFundMe campaign, Cargle founded the Loveland Foundation, a nonprofit organization which works to increase access to therapy for Black women and girls. Cargle has criticized what she describes as the commodification of wellness.

In 2019, Cargle studied at the Brooklyn Institute for Social Research and with Imani Perry of Princeton University. In 2020 she opened a writing center and bookstore in Akron, Ohio called Elizabeth’s Bookshop & Writing Centre. Cargle has an upcoming book with The Dial Press, examining "the intersection of race, feminism, and womanhood". Her work has also been featured in The Washington Post, Glamour Magazine, PopSugar, and Essence.

For her work educating the public on "matters of racial injustice, systemic racism, feminism, white supremacy, and countless other issue", Cargle was cited by Global Citizen as a notable activist for racial causes in 2020.

== Personal life ==
Cargle is divorced.

== Bibliography ==
- A Renaissance of Our Own, A Memoir and Manifesto on Reimagining. Penguin Random House (2023). ISBN 978-1-84792-673-9
