= Woollybear Festival =

American festival

- Genre: Festivals
- Location: Vermilion, Ohio
- Coordinates: 41°25′18″N 82°21′41″W
- Country: United States
- Years active: 52–53
- Inaugurated: 1973
- Website: www.vermilionohio.com/woollybear-festival/

The Woollybear Festival is held every fall in downtown Vermilion, Ohio, on Lake Erie. The one-day, family event, which began in 1973, features a woolly bear costume contest in which children, even pets, are dressed up as various renditions of the woolly bear caterpillar.

The festival is held every year around October 1 on a Sunday on which the Cleveland Browns either have an away game or are not playing. It is touted as the largest one-day festival in Ohio, with attendance over 100,000.

== History ==
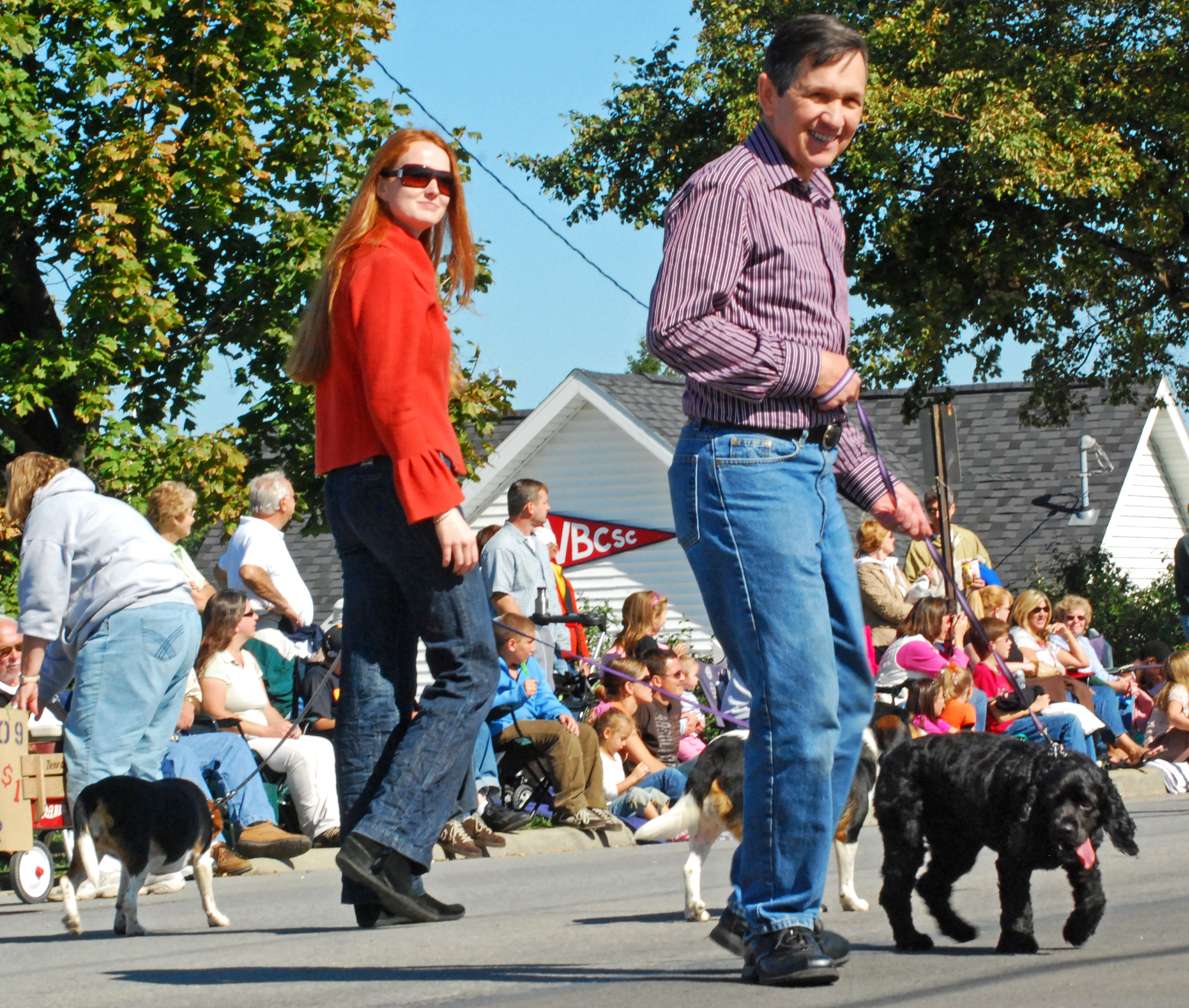
Former Ohio Congressman Dennis Kucinich, and his wife Elizabeth, at the Woollybear Festival parade in 2008.

The festival is the brainchild of the late Dick Goddard, the former long-time weatherman at Cleveland's WJW-TV. The Woolly Bear Caterpillar is similarly celebrated for its mythical association to winter forecasting. After the caterpillars' eggs hatch in fall, folklore suggests the severity of an upcoming winter can be gauged by observing the amount of black versus orange in the caterpillars' bands.

Attracting 2,000 spectators in the first year, the number grew to an estimated 15,000 by the eighth festival and quickly overwhelmed the town of Birmingham. Of the 13 cities that expressed interest, organizers selected Vermilion as the new home.

The "Woollybear 500" is a comedic race that starts off with Vermilion's police and fire chiefs selecting woollybears to race. The woollybears are obtained by the Vermilion Chamber and details of the training and skills of said woollybears are not divulged to the participants. The race is monitored by professionals from TV-8. No woollybears are harmed in the making of these races.

The 2020 Woollybear Festival was the first since the event's inception not to be held because of the COVID-19 pandemic.

== See also ==
- Woolly Worm Festival, a similar festival held annually in October in Banner Elk, North Carolina.
