= Singer Lake Bog =

- Location within Ohio
- Location: Summit County, Ohio
- Nearest city: Green
- Coordinates: 40°55′00″N 81°29′11″W
- Area: 344 acres (139 ha)
- Governing body: The Cleveland Museum of Natural History
- Website: www.cmnh.org/discover/nature/Natural-Areas-Program/Museum-Natural-Areas

Singer Lake Bog is a 344-acre nature preserve in the U.S. state of Ohio. It is owned by the Cleveland Museum of Natural History. With more than fifty acres of leatherleaf bog, it is the largest of its kind in the state of Ohio. Within the nature preserve is a five acre kettle lake bog that features tamarack, poison sumac, cranberries, northern purple pitcher plant, round-leaved sundew and sphagnum.

It is located in southern Summit County near the city of Green, Ohio.

== Flora ==
It is home to two carnivorous plants: the northern purple pitcher plant and the round-leaved sundew.

== Animals ==
The bog is home to animals such as beavers, and squirrels. There have been wild domestic cats spotted at this bog.
