= Woolly Worm Festival =

Annual festival in North Carolina, United States

Coordinates: 36.16293°N 81.86988°W

The Woolly Worm Festival is an event held each October since 1978 in Banner Elk and Avery County, North Carolina. The festival celebrates the supposed weather-predicting abilities of the woolly worm, also called "woolly bear" which is a caterpillar or larvae of the isabella tiger moth. Events include a caterpillar race.

== The caterpillar ==
Woolly Worm placed on a string during a Woolly Worm race

The isabella tiger moth belongs to the subfamily Arctiinae which has 11,000 species around the world. Prior to settling in for winter, the woolly worm eats a variety of plants and then produces a kind of antifreeze which protects the creature from temperatures as low as -90 degrees Fahrenheit. This caterpillar seeks safety from bitter winter weather by sheltering under logs, boulders, boards, rocks, and other dark places until emerging from its "frozen" state in May.

== Weather forecasting ==
It's accepted by organizers of the North Carolina woolly worm festival that the color of the worm's thirteen body segments or stripes can be read and interpreted as a forecaster of the severity of coming winter. Although not everyone recognizes the woolly worm as an accredited weather forecaster, the worm is held in esteem by festival celebrants because of its proclaimed 80-85 percent accuracy rate in predictions.

== The festival ==
Each year attendance at this mountain celebration averages 15,000-20,000 people. It's been featured in the world-famous Farmers' Almanac and the Kiwanis International Magazine.

Woolly Worm racing board used during the Woolly Worm Festival

Presiding over the yearly festival is a Master of Ceremonies. With the help of the festival's mascot Merriweather, the M.C. is responsible for ensuring festival rules are rigorously kept, in particular in regard to the caterpillar race. About 1200 worms are entered to compete, in at least 50 heats. During each heat worms must race 42 inches up a vertical string attached to cardboard on the backboard of a flatbed trailer. People are allowed to 'holler' and whistle to encourage their worm to race. Each heat consists of 20 worms and races continue all day until the grand final at about 4:00 p.m. The winning worm is announced as official forecaster, and its owner wins a monetary prize. The festival proceeds after expenses are distributed for support of community efforts and charities.

== See also ==
- Woollybear Festival, a similar festival held annually in Vermilion, Ohio
