= Heather Kozar =

American model

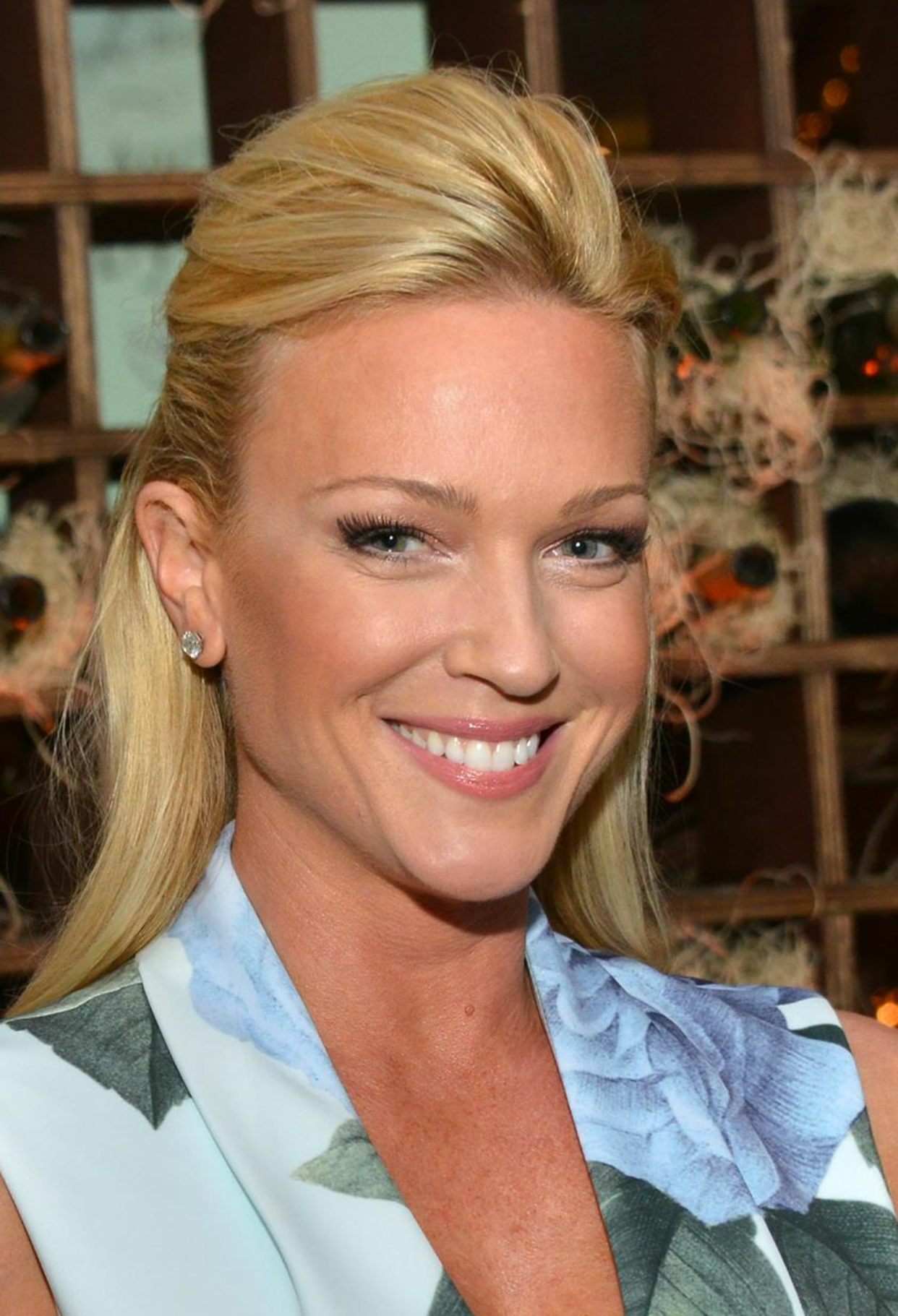
- Kozar in 2015

Playboy centerfold appearance
- January 1998
- Preceded by: Karen McDougal
- Succeeded by: Julia Schultz

Playboy Playmate of the Year
- 1999
- Preceded by: Karen McDougal
- Succeeded by: Jodi Ann Paterson

Personal details
- Born: May 4, 1976 (age 50) Akron, Ohio, US
- Height: 5 ft 8 in (1.73 m)

Heather Kozar (born May 4, 1976) is an American glamour model known as Playboy's Playmate of the Month for January 1998 and Playmate of the Year for 1999, and for her work on the game show The Price Is Right.

== Early life ==
Heather Kozar was born in Akron, Ohio. She grew up in Green, Ohio, and graduated from Green High School in 1994.

== Career ==
In 1998 Kozar became Playboy magazine's Playmate of the Month for January 1998, appearing in both the monthly nude photo spread and a series of Playboy videos. She was voted Playmate of the Year for 1999 and appeared on the cover of the June 1999 issue of the magazine. Her original centerfold was photographed by Richard Fegley.

In 2001, Kozar became a Barker's Beauty model for the CBS daytime game show The Price Is Right. She eventually left the show, according to Fremantle Media, the show's production company, because her increased fame led to appearances in an increasing number of television commercials and other assignments, some of which conflicted with the show's production schedule. Fremantle Media executive Syd Vinnedge praised Kozar, saying, "I've been delighted with the contribution [Kozar] made to our show. We're pleased when our models can use appearances on The Price Is Right as a steppingstone."

In 2002, Kozar was the St Pauli Girl, the spokesmodel for the beer of the same name.

Kozar's image has appeared in Jeff Koons paintings, including "Triple Elvis" (2007) and "Peg Leg Double Elvis" (2009).

Kozar modeled for companies such as Brut cologne, BMW, Wendy's, and Cutty Sark Scots Whisky.

In 2009, Boston.com ranked Kozar No. 5 in its list of the "Ten prettiest NFL girlfriends and wives". At the time, Kozar was married to former NFL player Tim Couch.

== Filmography ==
- Back Home Again, Madison, 2004
- The Price Is Right, Herself, 2001–2002 (213 episodes)
- WWE Smackdown!, Herself, 1999
- Shasta McNasty, Playmate Cindy, 1999

Heather Kozar	Julia Schultz	Marliece Andrada	Holly Joan Hart	Deanna Brooks	Maria Luisa Gil
Lisa Dergan	Angela Little	Vanessa Gleason	Laura Cover	Tiffany Taylor	Dahm triplets
