= Christian DiLauro =

American football player (born 1994)

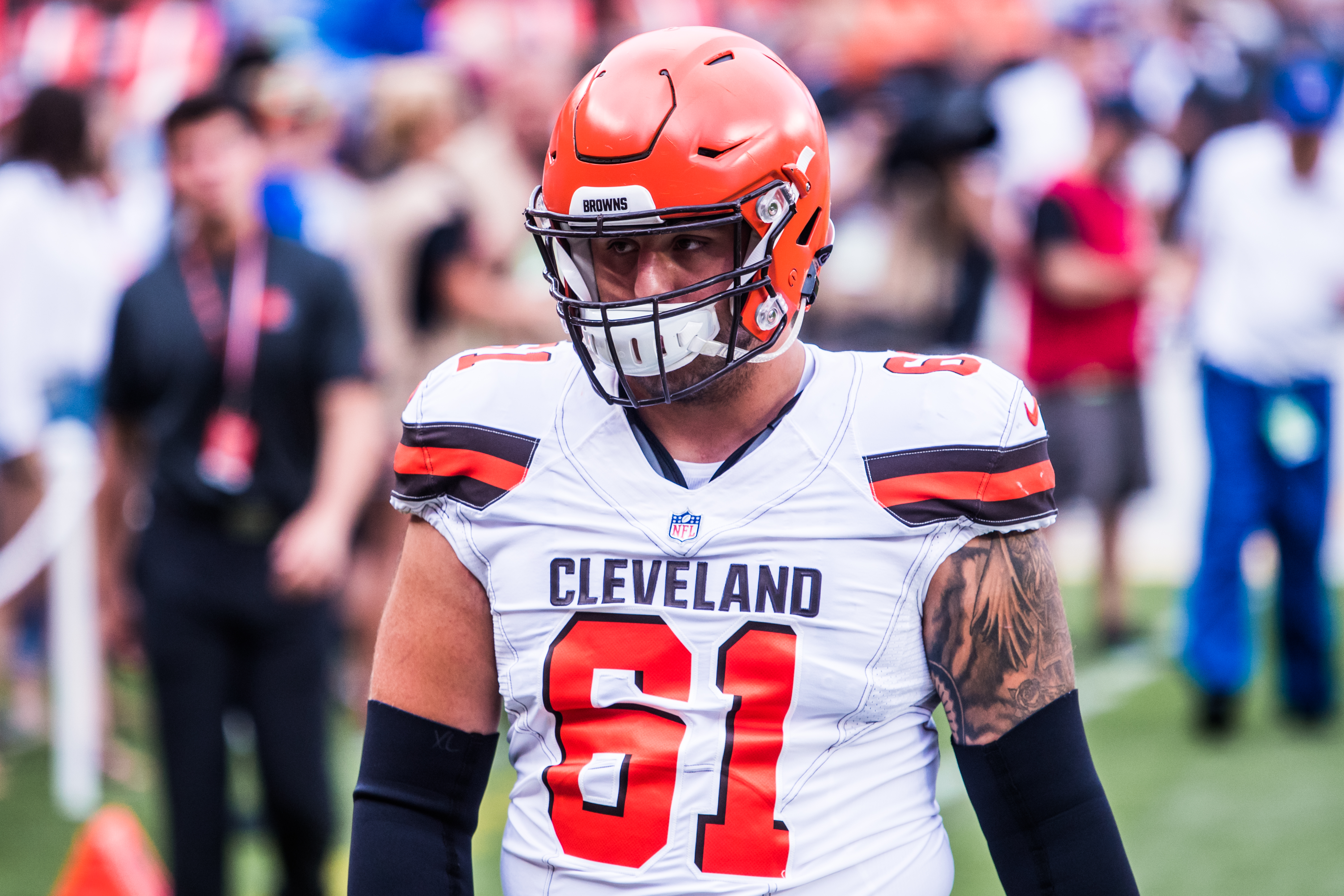
- DiLauro with the Cleveland Browns in 2018

Profile
- Position: Offensive tackle

Personal information
- Born: November 11, 1994 (age 31); Uniontown, Ohio, U.S.
- Listed height: 6 ft 5 in (1.96 m)
- Listed weight: 300 lb (136 kg)

Career information
- High school: Green (Green, Ohio)
- College: Illinois
- NFL draft: 2018: undrafted

Career history
- Cleveland Browns (2018)*; San Francisco 49ers (2018–2019)*; Houston Texans (2019)*; Pittsburgh Steelers (2019–2020)*; Tennessee Titans (2021–2022); Washington Commanders (2022)*; Denver Broncos (2022); Minnesota Vikings (2023)*; Birmingham Stallions (2024–2025)
- * Offseason or practice squad member only

Awards and highlights
- UFL champion (2024); Big Ten All-Freshman team (2014)

Career NFL statistics
- Games played: 5
- Stats at Pro Football Reference

Christian Joseph DiLauro (born November 11, 1994) is an American professional football offensive tackle. He played college football for the Illinois Fighting Illini. DiLauro signed with the Cleveland Browns as an undrafted free agent in 2018 and has also been a member of several other NFL teams.

== College career ==
DiLauro started 38 games for Illinois. In 2014, he was named to the Big Ten All-Freshman team.

== Professional career ==
Pre-draft measurables
Height	Weight	Arm length	Hand span	40-yard dash	10-yard split	20-yard split	20-yard shuttle	Three-cone drill	Vertical jump	Broad jump	Bench press
6 ft 5 1/2 in (1.97 m)	300 lb (136 kg)	33 3/8 in (0.85 m)	10 1/4 in (0.26 m)	5.05 s	1.81 s	2.95 s	4.76 s	7.61 s	32.0 in (0.81 m)	9 ft 3 in (2.82 m)	25 reps
All values from Pro Day

=== Cleveland Browns ===
DiLauro went undrafted in the 2018 NFL draft. On May 4, 2018, he was signed by the Cleveland Browns. DiLauro was waived on September 1, but was re-signed two days later to the Browns' practice squad. On September 4, 2018, DiLauro was cut from the Browns' practice squad.

=== San Francisco 49ers ===
On September 26, 2018, DiLauro was signed to the San Francisco 49ers' practice squad. He signed a reserve/future contract with the 49ers on January 2, 2019. He was waived on August 21, 2019.

=== Houston Texans ===
DiLauro signed with the Houston Texans on August 25, 2019. On August 30, DiLauro was released. On September 25, DiLauro was signed to the practice squad. He was released on October 1.

=== Pittsburgh Steelers ===
On October 15, 2019, DiLauro was signed to the Pittsburgh Steelers practice squad. On December 30, he was signed by the Steelers to a reserve/future contract. He was waived on September 5, 2020.

=== Tennessee Titans ===
On May 26, 2021, DiLauro signed with the Tennessee Titans. He was waived on August 31, 2021, and re-signed to the practice squad. He was released on September 10 and re-signed to the practice squad four days later.

On December 23, 2021, DiLauro was promoted to the active roster and made his NFL debut in the Titans' week 16 game against the San Francisco 49ers. After the Titans were eliminated in the Divisional Round of the 2021 playoffs, he signed a reserve/future contract on January 24, 2022. On August 30, 2022, DiLauro was waived by the Titans and re-signed to the practice squad on September 21, 2022. He was released on October 4.

=== Washington Commanders ===
DiLauro signed with the practice squad of the Washington Commanders on October 5, 2022. He was released on October 19.

=== Denver Broncos ===
On October 24, 2022, DiLauro signed with the practice squad of the Denver Broncos. He was promoted to the active roster on December 19. He was waived on July 31, 2023.

=== Minnesota Vikings ===
On August 3, 2023, DiLauro signed with the Minnesota Vikings. He was waived on August 28, 2023.

=== Birmingham Stallions ===
DiLauro signed with the Birmingham Stallions of the USFL on September 21, 2023. He was placed on injured reserve on June 4, 2024.

=== Houston Gamblers ===
On January 13, 2026, DiLauro was selected by the Houston Gamblers in the 2026 UFL Draft.
