= Dick Goddard =

American broadcast meteorologist (1931–2020)

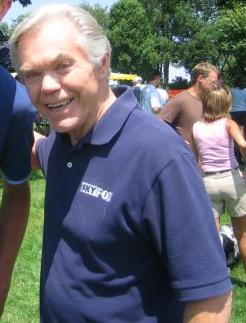
- Goddard at a Humane Society event in Wayne County, Ohio in 2011
- Born: Richard Duane Goddard; February 24, 1931; Akron, Ohio, U.S.
- Died: August 4, 2020 (aged 89); Florida, U.S.
- Education: Green High School; Kent State University
- Occupations: television news weatherman, meteorologist, author
- Years active: 1955–2016
- Known for: Longest career as a weather forecaster
- Spouse: Amber Goddard (née Williams) (m. 1997; div. 2004)
- Partner: Julie Ann Cashel (1972–1996)
- Children: 1
- Parents: Vatchel Goddard (father); Doris Goddard (née Dickerhoof) (mother)
- Military career
- Allegiance: United States
- Branch: United States Air Force
- Service years: 1949–1955
- Units: 6th Mobile Weather Squadron; United States Atomic Energy Commission
- Conflicts: Korean War

Richard Duane Goddard (February 24, 1931 – August 4, 2020) was an American television meteorologist, author, cartoonist, and animal activist.

From 1966 until his retirement in 2016, he was the evening meteorologist at WJW-TV in Cleveland, Ohio.

Goddard holds the Guinness World Record for longest career as a weather forecaster after passing Canadian meteorologist Peter Coade.

== Early life, education, and military career ==
Goddard was born on February 24, 1931, in Akron, Ohio. His father, Vatchel Goddard, was a mechanic for Railway Express Agency. His mother, Doris Goddard (née Dickerhoof), was a homemaker. Both of his parents had a fourth grade education. He lived in Akron from birth to 1941. The family moved to a small farm in Greensburg, Ohio (now called Green) in 1941. The farm was five acres. At age four, his father took him to Michigan to fish in the summer. He would continue to fish until 1973, before giving it up. Goddard played football (tailback and single-wing), baseball (third base), and basketball in high school. His senior year, he played basketball and they became Class B champions. Goddard went to his first Cleveland Browns game in Akron in August 1948. Just before joining the United States Air Force, Goddard tried out for the Brooklyn Dodgers at Firestone Park. The Dodgers called him the next day to come back, but never did since none of his friends got invited back.

After graduating from Green High School, he began his weather career while taking classes on meteorology during a stint with the United States Air Force from 1949 through 1955. He had basic training at Sampson Air Force Base. Goddard was given the standard aptitude test. The lieutenant who administered the test said he qualified as sharpshooter since there were no cartoonists. Goddard thought about it and declined. The lieutenant said he was suited for meteorology. Goddard was immediately sent to the Korean Peninsula before the outbreak of the Korean War. Before he could go to the Korean Peninsula, Goddard was sent to Greenland. After Greenland, he was assigned to the 6th Mobile Weather Squadron at Tinker AFB in Oklahoma. During this time, Goddard's most notable assignment was forecasting for atmospheric nuclear weapons tests by the United States Atomic Energy Commission (USAEC) in the Pacific. While stationed with USAEC at Enewetak Atoll, the first hydrogen bomb was tested there in the Pacific Islands and, Goddard met Edward Teller.

He then attended Kent State University, where he majored in drama and broadcasting. While there he had notable success as the lead character, Curly, in the school's production of Rodgers and Hammerstein's Oklahoma!

== Career ==
While at Kent State, Goddard joined the National Weather Service at the Akron-Canton Airport. He stayed there for five years. After graduating from Kent State in 1960, Goddard joined the weather team at Westinghouse-owned KYW-TV (now WKYC-TV) in Cleveland and was hired for thirteen weeks. He had the distinction of being the first meteorologist on Cleveland television. As fortune would have it, Hurricane Donna became the first storm he covered. In December 1960, he was on Linn Sheldon's Barnaby show. A year later; while at KYW-TV, Goddard worked alongside sports anchor Jim Graner. Goddard was one of several employees of KYW-TV who agreed to move to WRCV-TV in Philadelphia in June 1965, after Westinghouse was allowed by the FCC to reverse a station trade with NBC in 1956 based on coercion in order for Westinghouse to retain their NBC affiliations; the KYW calls also moved back to Philadelphia. However, Goddard did not take a liking to Philadelphia, and returned to Cleveland several months later. In 1966, Goddard became the chief meteorologist at WJW-TV, where he would work for the remainder of his career. During his tenure he became one of the most popular area broadcasters.

After returning to Cleveland, Goddard also was employed with the NFL's Cleveland Browns as the team's official statistician for home games. Then a CBS affiliate, WJW carried Browns' games at the time as part of their NFL play-by-play contract until the 1970 AFL-NFL merger (due to the Browns' move to the AFC), at which point the games moved to WKYC – this was a key factor in his having joined the station. He held this position from 1966 to 2011, with the exception of a three-year period from 1996 to 1999 when the franchise was suspended as the old Browns franchise moved to Baltimore and Cleveland was given a new team.

From August 1977 to January 1979, Goddard also hosted WJW's version of Bowling for Dollars, a syndicated franchised game show. He also appeared in numerous skits on WJW's popular Big Chuck and Lil' John Show over the years, and did occasional stage work.

In honor of Goddard's 50 years on Cleveland TV, most of which was spent at WJW, the portion of South Marginal Road (the southern frontage road of the Cleveland Memorial Shoreway) in front of the WJW studios was renamed "Dick Goddard Way" on May 23, 2011.

As of 2014 Goddard resided in Medina Township, Ohio.

In December 2014, at age 83, Goddard signed a "multi-year" contract renewal with WJW. On May 18, 2016, Goddard announced that he would retire from his weather duties in November 2016, while continuing his animal advocacy and remaining host of the Woollybear Festival. He delivered his last forecast on the station on November 22, 2016, with the station's weather center renamed for him. He continued to tape animal advocacy and adoption segments for WJW.

=== The Woollybear Festival ===
In 1973 Goddard created the first Woollybear Festival, a day-long family event dedicated to teaching children about the weather, family fun, and animals. Some of the events include a caterpillar race, animal costume contests, and musical performances.

== Personal life and death ==
In 1950, Goddard had a pet raccoon named Freddie. He lived in Medina, Ohio. Goddard had one daughter, Kim. He was in a relationship with Julie Ann Cashel for more than 20 years until her death in 1996. His mother, Doris, also died in 1996. Goddard married his second wife, Amber, in December 1997 and divorced her in 2004. In September 2016, he fell at home and fractured a hip. Goddard continued with rehab and doctors expected him to make a full recovery. His estate was up for auction in early November 2019.

Goddard moved to Florida where he was in a medical facility. His daughter Kim became his caregiver. Goddard had pneumonia in January 2020. Kim revealed on May 13, 2020, that he was ill. His daughter revealed in June 2020 that he tested positive for COVID-19. Goddard died on August 4, 2020, at the age of 89. No cause of death was released. His ashes were spread under various trees including one at the WJW studios.

== Legacy ==
Goddard was an outspoken opponent of animal abuse. "Dick Goddard's Law", a bill to increase the severity of penalties for abuse, was introduced into the Ohio General Assembly in 2013 and reintroduced in 2015. The 2015 version was signed into law on June 13, 2016.

== Awards and honors ==
Meteorology

- American Meteorological Society Seal of Approval (#45)
- Guinness Book of World Records - Longest career as a weather forecaster (51 years, 6 days)

Broadcasting

- 2011 Gold Circle Award, presented by Lower Great Lakes Emmy Awards chapter
- 1992 Silver Circle Award, presented by Lower Great Lakes Emmy Awards chapter
- Fox 8 News weather desk renamed the "Dick Goddard Weather Center"

Halls of Fame

- Cleveland Press Club Journalism Hall of Fame Inductee (class of 2001)
- Ohio Broadcasters Hall of Fame Inductee (class of 1989)
- Cleveland Association of Broadcasters Hall of Fame Inductee (class of 1994)

State/local

- South Marginal Road in Cleveland renamed "Dick Goddard Way"
- Ohio GA 131 House Bill 60 named "Dick Goddard's Law"
- Two dog parks named for Goddard:
  - In his hometown of Green, Ohio (Dick Goddard Dog Park)
  - In Vermillion, Ohio - home of the annual Woollybear Festival founded by Goddard in 1973

== Bibliography ==
- Goddard, Dick; Feran, Tom (2011). Six Inches of Partly Cloudy: Cleveland's Legendary TV Meteorologist Takes on Everything–and More. Cleveland: Gray & Co. ISBN 978-1-59851-066-9.
- Goddard, Dick (2005). Dick Goddard's Almanac for Northeast Ohio. Cleveland: Gray & Co. ISBN 1-886228-92-2. (Also published 2002–2004)
- Goddard, Dick (1998). Dick Goddard's Weather Guide for Northeast Ohio. Cleveland: Gray & Co. ISBN 1-886228-12-4.
