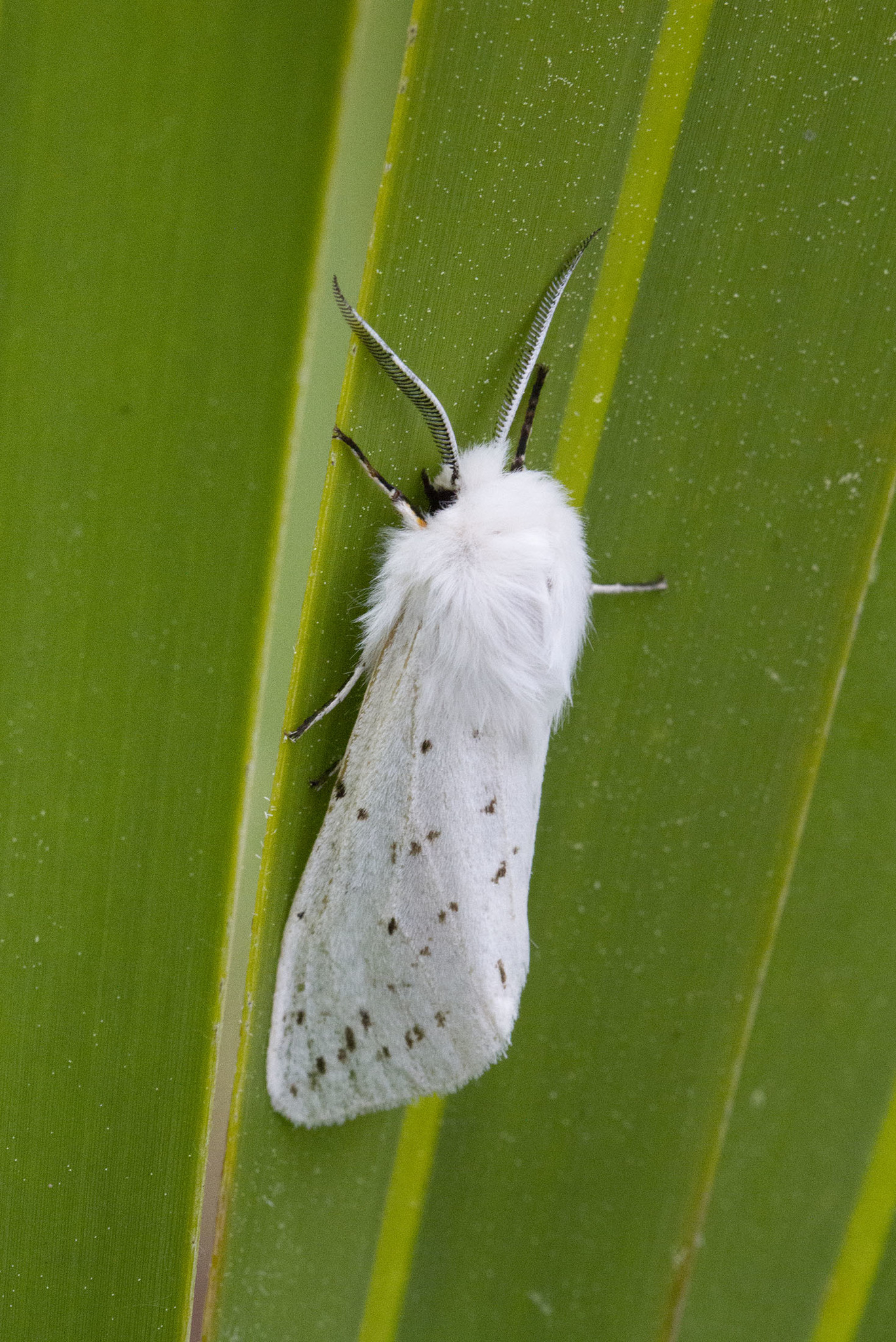

Scientific classification
- Kingdom: Animalia
- Phylum: Arthropoda
- Class: Insecta
- Order: Lepidoptera
- Superfamily: Noctuoidea
- Family: Erebidae
- Subfamily: Arctiinae
- Genus: Spilosoma
- Species: S. dubia

Binomial name
- Spilosoma dubia (Walker, 1855)

Synonyms
- Cynia dubia Walker, 1855; Spilosoma prima Slosson, 1889

= Spilosoma dubia =

Dubious tiger moth

Species of moth

Spilosoma dubia, the dubious tiger moth, is a moth in the family Erebidae. It was described by Francis Walker in 1855. It is found from south-eastern Canada west to Alberta and in the eastern United States. The habitat consists of aspen parkland and southern boreal forests.

The wingspan is 32–38 mm. Adults are on wing from mid-May to mid-June.

The larvae have been recorded feeding on Prunus serotina.

== See also ==
- Agreeable tiger moth
