= Green Local Schools =

School district in Ohio

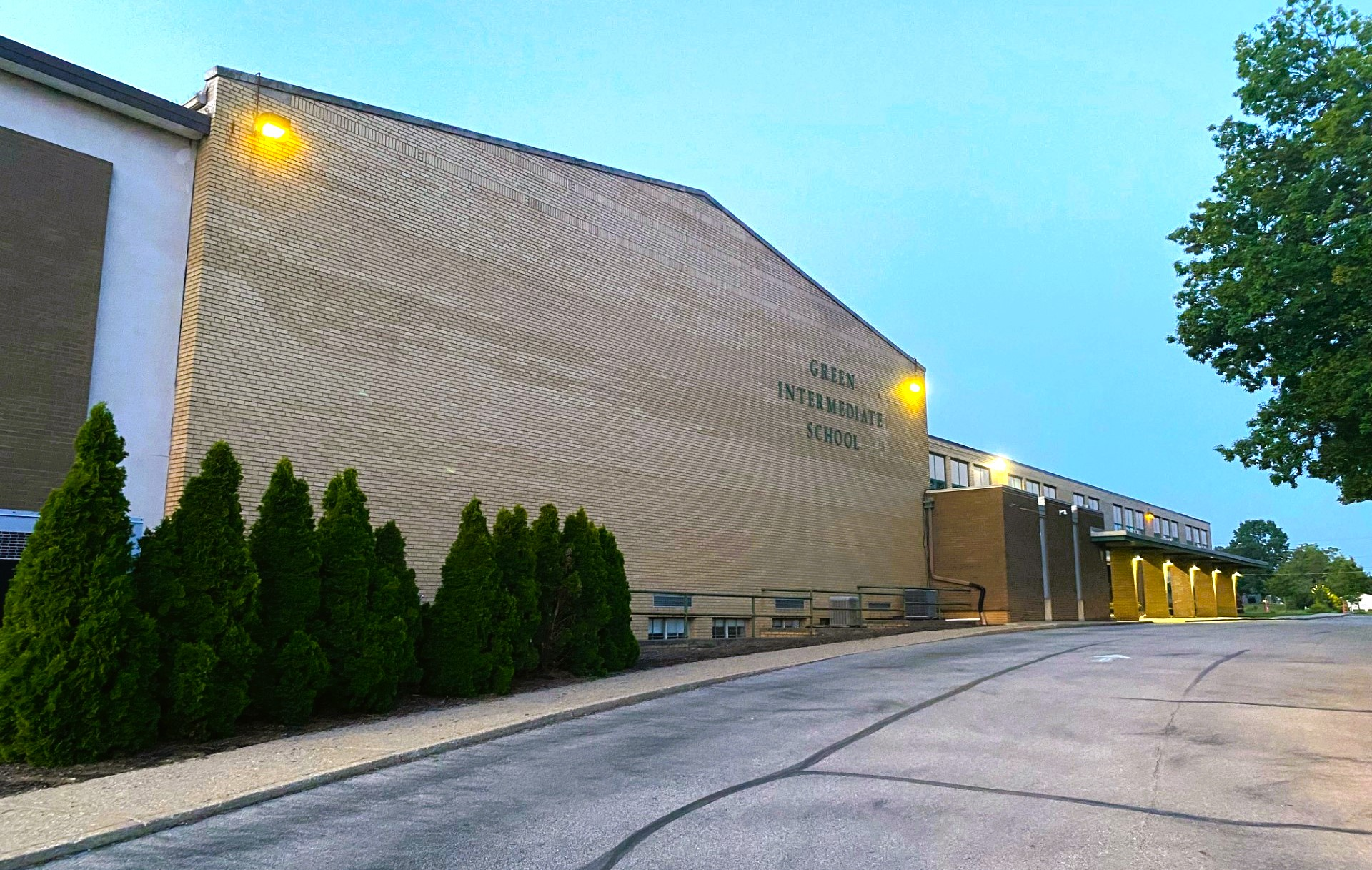

District information
- Type: Public
- Motto: “Be safe, be kind, be responsible."
- Grades: K-12
- Superintendent: Jeffrey L. Miller II

Students and staff
- Students: 4253
- Staff: 583
- District mascot: Bulldog
- Colors: Orange & Black

Other information
- Website: greenlocalschools.org

Green Local Schools is a school district serving the city of Green, Ohio. The current superintendent of the district is Jeffrey L. Miller II.

== Schools ==
- Green High School (grades 9 through 12)
- Green Middle School (grades 6 through 8)
- Green Elementary School (grades 2 through 5)
- Green Primary School (preschool, kindergarten, and first grade)

The district completed facility upgrades with the opening of two new schools in the fall of 2025. A newly constructed Green Middle School now houses grades 6 through 8, replacing the prior middle school and Green Intermediate School, which was built in 1956 and served as the district's high school until the current building was completed and opened in 1996. A new Green Elementary School, which serves students in grades 2 through 5, has since been constructed on the site of the former Greenwood Early Learning Center, which housed preschool through kindergarten before closing down during the end of the 2024-25 school year. Green Primary School has been renovated and now serves students from preschool to the 1st grade.

Kleckner Elementary School, which housed grades 3 and 4, was closed at the end of the 2011 school year due to financial constraints. The original part of the building was constructed in 1903..

== Demographics ==
On average, 4026 students attend Green Local Schools. The majority of the students are white (92.3%), while other races include 2.2% Asian or Pacific Islander, 2.2% Multiracial, 1.9% Black, and 1.2% Hispanic. Approximately 12.7% of the students have disabilities and 1.5% have limited English proficiency. Around 18.2% of students are economically disadvantaged.

== Career Center ==
The Portage Lakes Career Center, or PLCC, is a local trade and vocational school that Green High School students can attend part or full time to learn trades including Automotive Technology, Building Trades, Cosmetology, Pre-Nursing, Welding, Engineering Processes, HVAC, Sports Medicine, Culinary Arts, Design, and other subjects, and also provides certifications for the high school students attending. since its opening in 1977. Juniors and seniors from partner districts, with Green being one of the partner schools, can apply online, with a priority deadline typically in early December.

Portage Lakes Career Center is in compliance with the standard and criteria for Postsecondary Schools established by the Board of Trustees of the North Central Association Commission on Accreditation and School Improvement (NCA CASI).

It is designated as an Ohio Center for Training Excellence (CTX), allowing it to design specialized curricula for local employers.

== District Enrollment Figures (K-12) ==
1965	1970	1974-75	1980	1985	1990	1995	2000	2005	2010	2015	2019	2020	2023
3,615	3,973	3,853	3,639	3,130	3,084	3,494	3,871	4,120	4,197	4,052	3,993	4,032	3,908

== Lunch scandal ==
In September 2019, staff at Green Primary School disposed of a 9-year-old student's hot lunch and replaced it with a cheese sandwich and milk due to his negative lunch money balance of -$9. This, coupled with the fact that it was the student's birthday, led to widespread media scrutiny. This was covered by both national and local news. Green Local Schools addressed the allegations later that week and reformed its lunch policy after receiving nation-wide criticism.

== Social Media Scandal ==
A few years later, on September 19th, 2024, two students at Green High School in Summit County, Ohio, were disciplined after a racist homecoming proposal referencing slavery circulated on social media. This made it to the news, and led to widespread media scrutiny. Superintendent Jeff Miller and Principal Cindy Brown, after learning of the social media post, condemned the actions, and later stating the social media post contradict the values of Green Local Schools, and will not be tolerated. In response to this incident, the school has acted swiftly to issue disciplinary action to the two students, and the district provided counseling and educational opportunities for the students involved with this incident, and to their families who have observed the post. The incident also prompted strong condemnation from parents and community members, with some calling for a zero-tolerance policy against such behavior.

== Vandalism in 2025 ==
Green High School experienced heightened security following the discovery of threatening messages and vandalism in school restrooms. Parents were notified during the later hours of May the 8th of the threat in a message through the Green school district's ParentSquare accounts. The message from the school's principal described the threat as an act of vandalism. Similar incidents in previous years involved school evacuations, and officials have indicated that perpetrators for this incident had faced some serious consequences, often involving law enforcement. It is unknown what consequences that the perpetrators received, but the consequences for the perpetrators included some serious criminal convictions and some very serious school consequences. The Summit County Sheriff's Office was actively investigating the incidents and was supporting the school by allocating additional deputies within the building during the school day during May 9th and after that date. Also, the building and surrounding grounds were being actively patrolled during the night time. Like with the racist homecoming proposal controversy a few months before this even happened, this made headlines, and has led to widespread media scrutiny. There were also additional safety and security measures were also put in place for their after-school activities for an unknown amount of time, which has caused some apprehensions with the general public. The school was very lucky that, through the support of their community, has been equipped with excellent cameras and other security measures, which has greatly assisted with the investigation and the identification of the perpetrator(s) of the incident.
