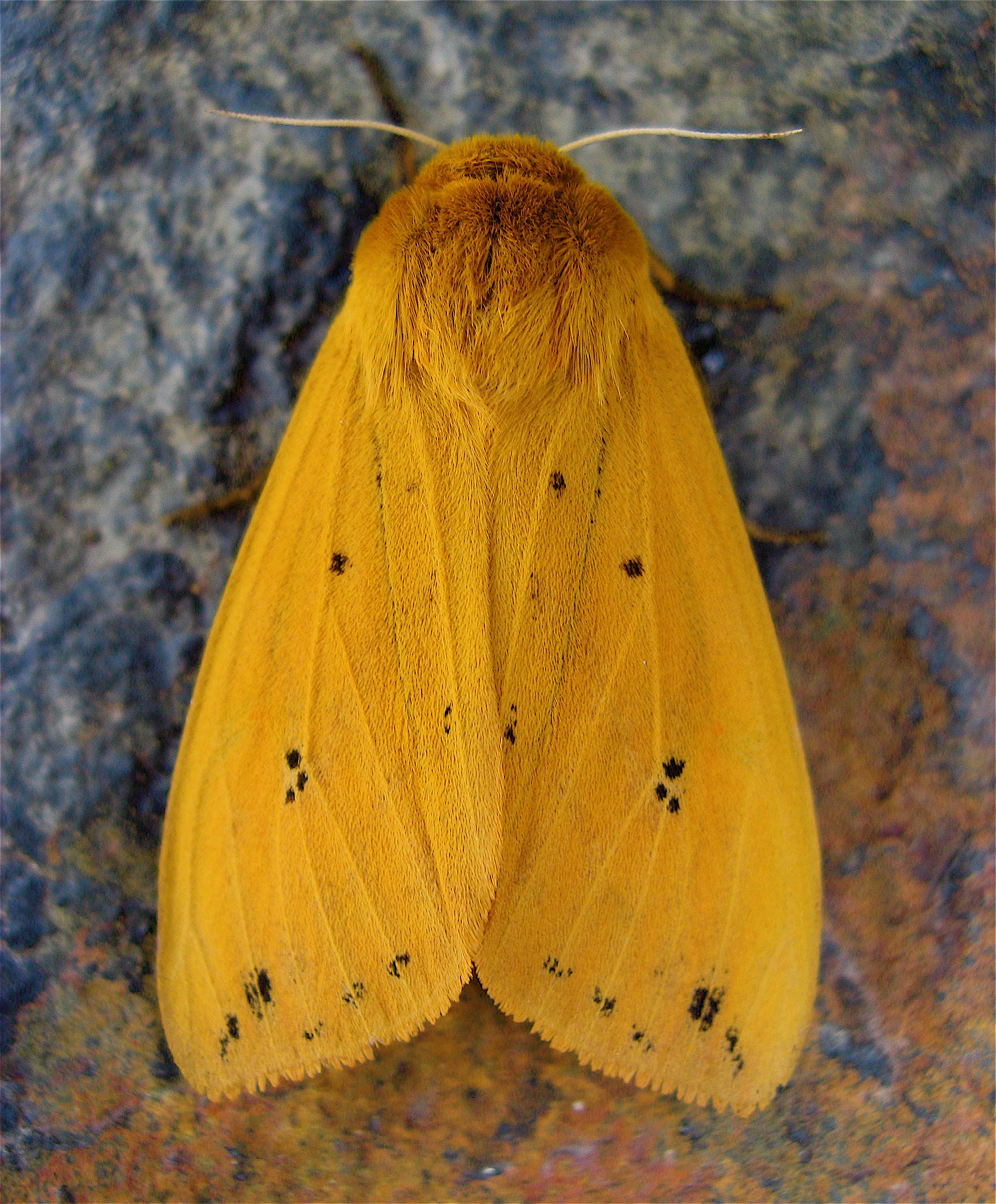
- Pyrrharctia isabella

Scientific classification
- Kingdom: Animalia
- Phylum: Arthropoda
- Clade: Pancrustacea
- Class: Insecta
- Order: Lepidoptera
- Superfamily: Noctuoidea
- Family: Erebidae
- Subfamily: Arctiinae
- Subtribe: Spilosomina
- Genus: Pyrrharctia; Packard, 1864

Type species
- Phalaena isabella Smith, 1797

= Pyrrharctia =

Genus of moths

Pyrrharctia is a genus of moths in the family Erebidae described by Packard in 1864. The species are known from North and Central America.

== Species ==
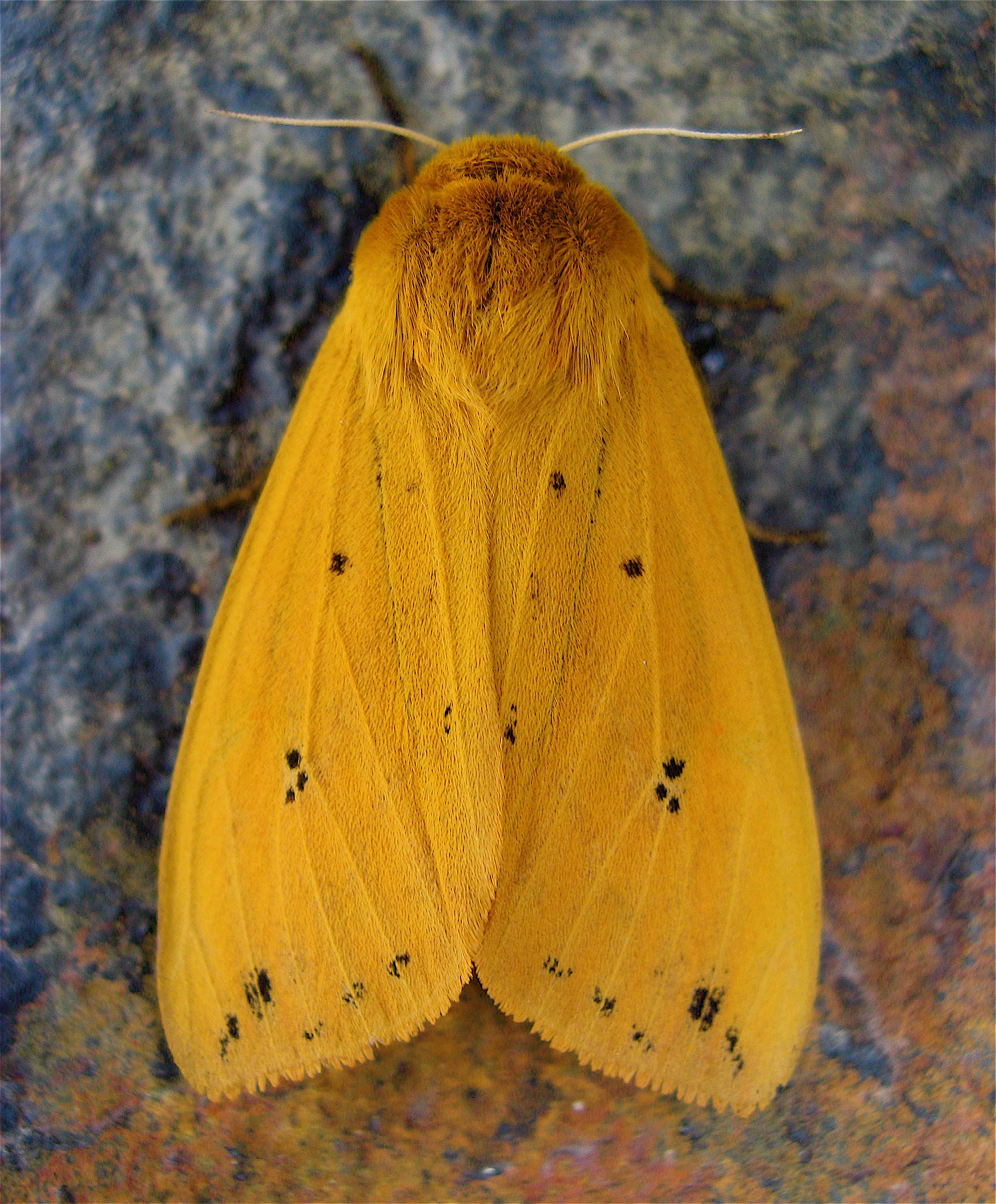
- Pyrrharctia isabella
  Pyrrharctia isabella (Smith, 1797) – isabella tiger moth
- Pyrrharctia genini (Debauche, 1938)
