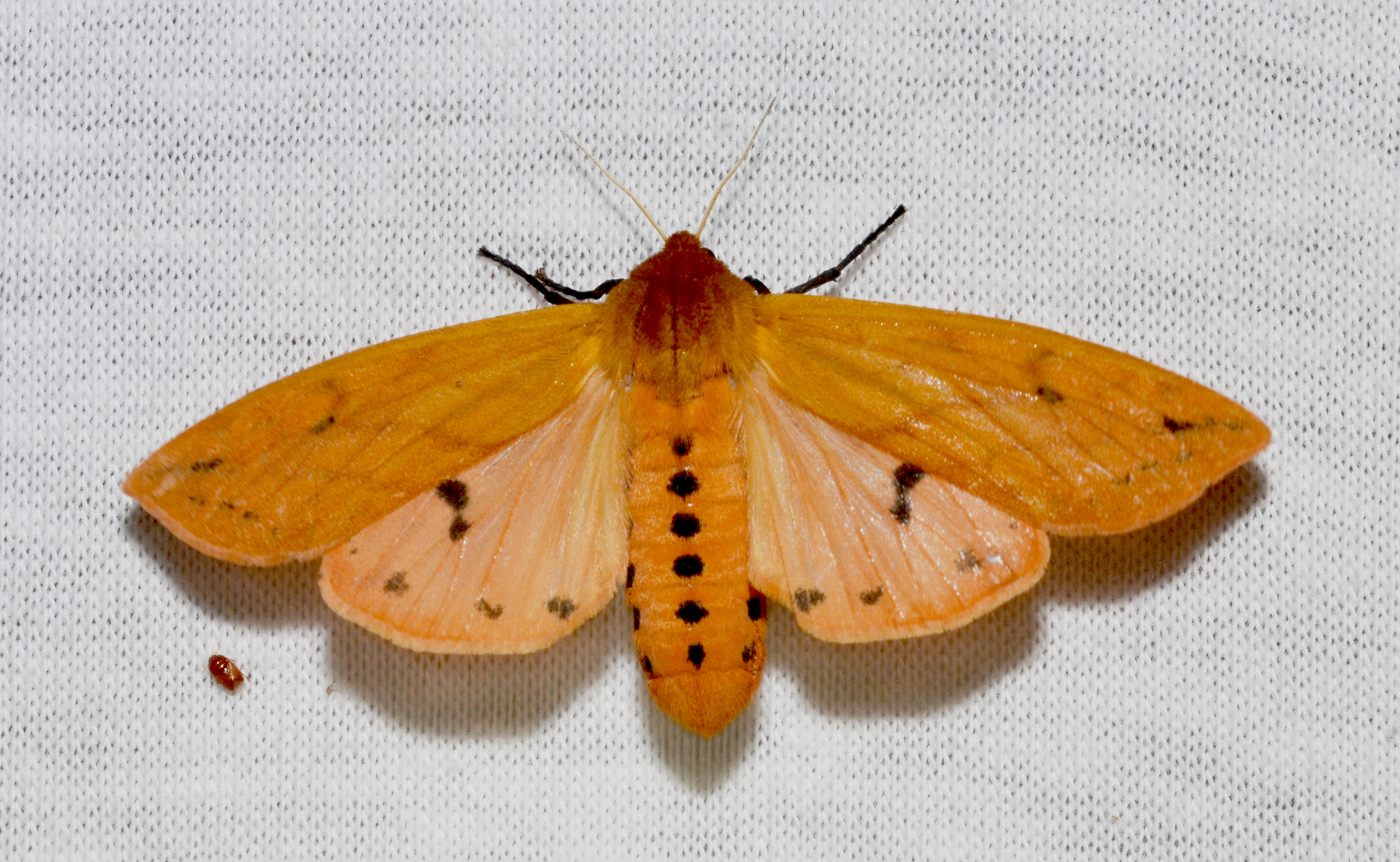
- Adult
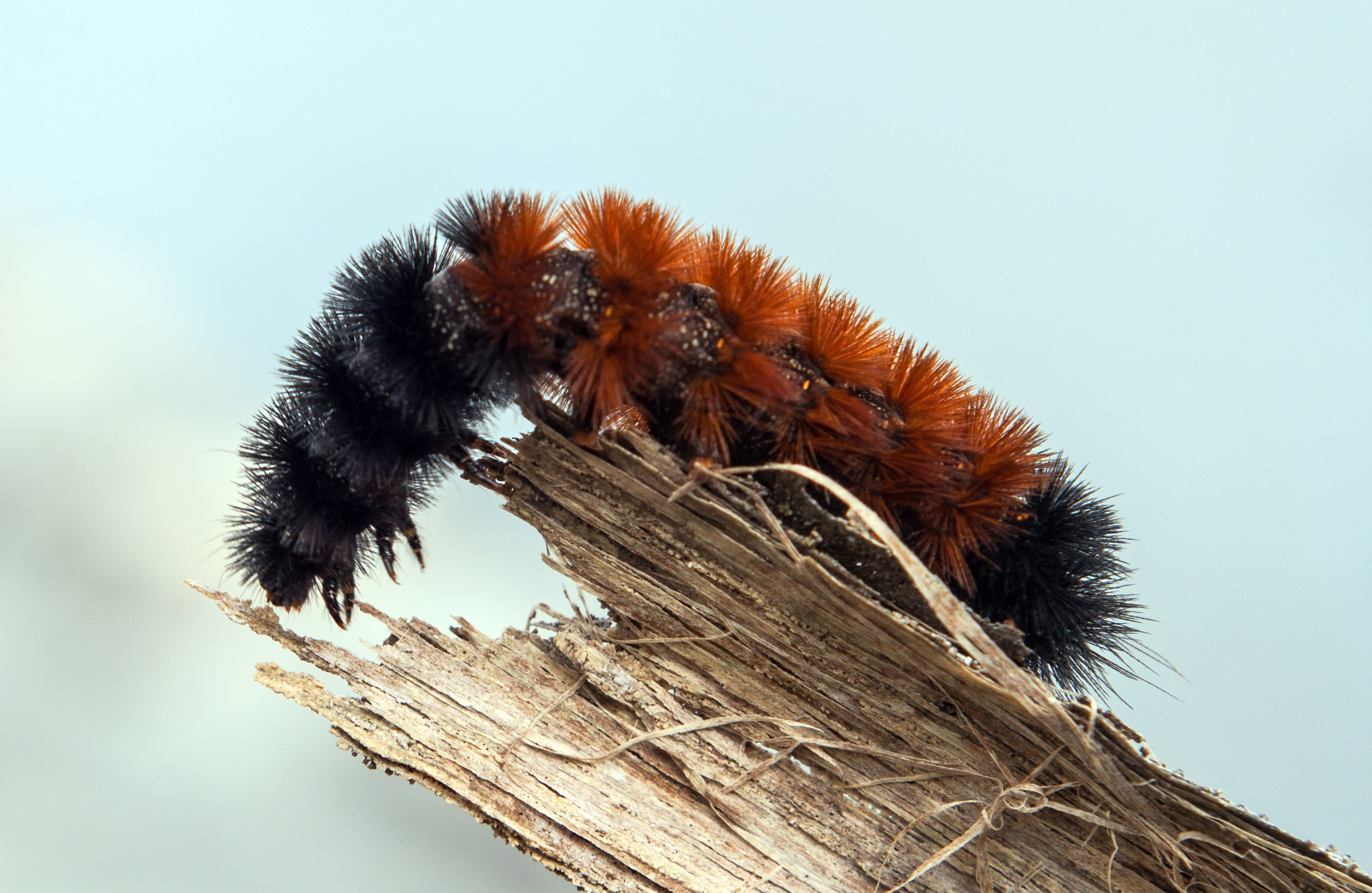
- Woolly bear caterpillar

Scientific classification
- Kingdom: Animalia
- Phylum: Arthropoda
- Clade: Pancrustacea
- Class: Insecta
- Order: Lepidoptera
- Superfamily: Noctuoidea
- Family: Erebidae
- Subfamily: Arctiinae
- Genus: Pyrrharctia
- Species: P. isabella

Binomial name
- Pyrrharctia isabella (J. E. Smith, 1797)

Synonyms
- Phalaena isabella J. E. Smith, 1797; Pyrrharctia californica Packard, 1864

= Pyrrharctia isabella =

Species of insect

Pyrrharctia isabella, the Isabella tiger moth, whose larval form is called the banded woolly bear, woolly bear, or woolly worm, occurs in the United States and throughout Canada. It was first formally named by James Edward Smith in 1797.

== Description ==
The thirteen-segment larvae are usually covered with brown hair in their mid-regions and black hair in their anterior and posterior areas. In direct sunlight, the brown hair looks bright reddish brown. The setae are uniform in length, unlike in other tiger moth larvae with similar appearance. Adults are generally dull yellowish through orangish and have robust, scaly thoraces; small heads; and bright reddish-orange forelegs. Wings have sparse black spotting. Each abdominal segment bears three black dots.

The Isabella tiger moth can be found in many cold and temperate regions. The banded woolly bear larva emerges from the egg in the fall and overwinters in its caterpillar form, by allowing most of its mass to freeze solid. First its heart stops beating, then its gut freezes, then its blood, followed by the rest of the body. It survives being frozen by producing a cryoprotectant in its tissues. This freezing occurs outside of body cells, but not within. In the spring, it thaws.

Larval setae do not inject venom and are not urticant; they do not typically cause irritation, injury, inflammation, or swelling. Handling larvae is discouraged, however, because their sharp, spiny hairs may cause dermatitis in some people.

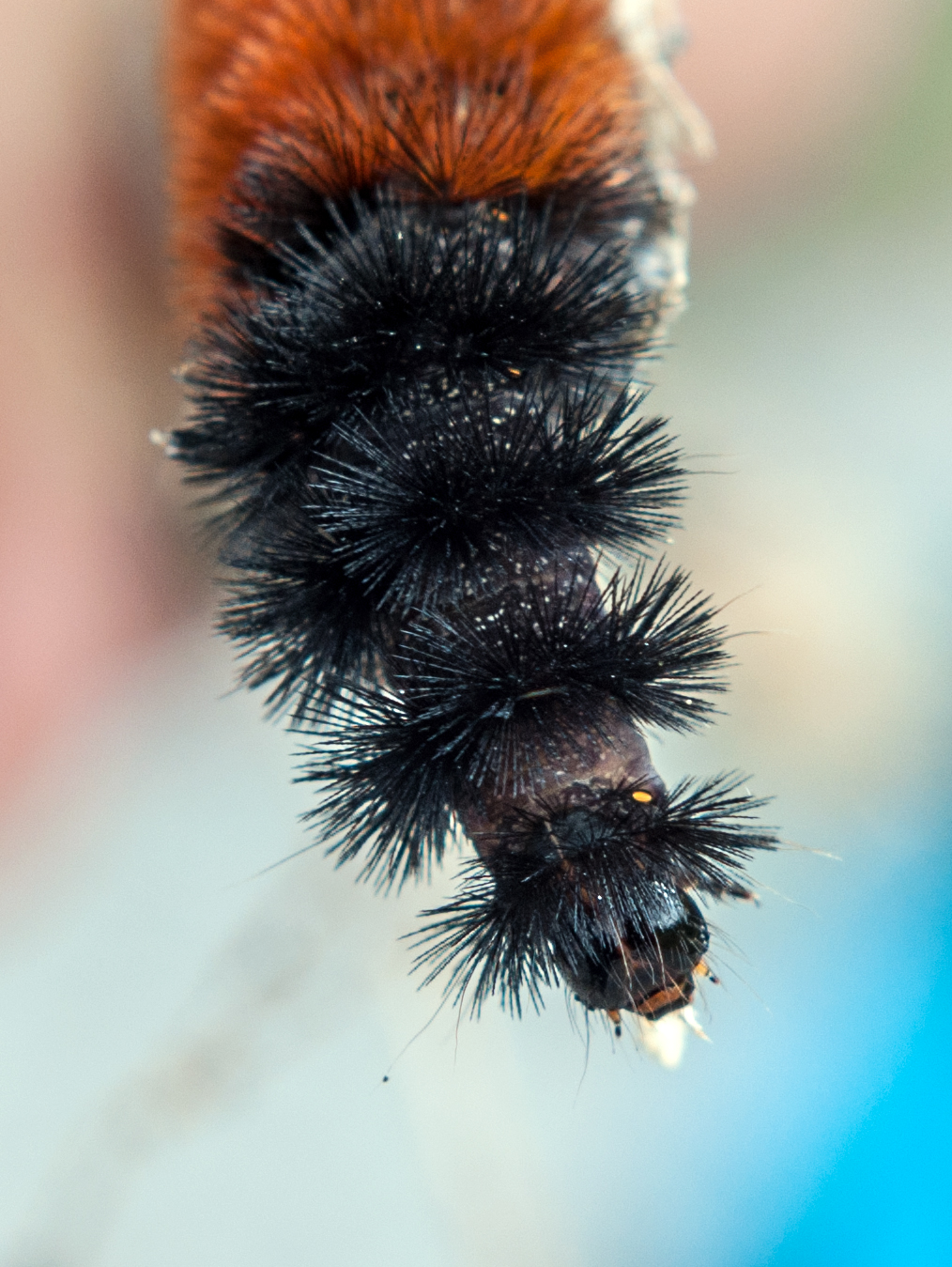
Head of a caterpillar

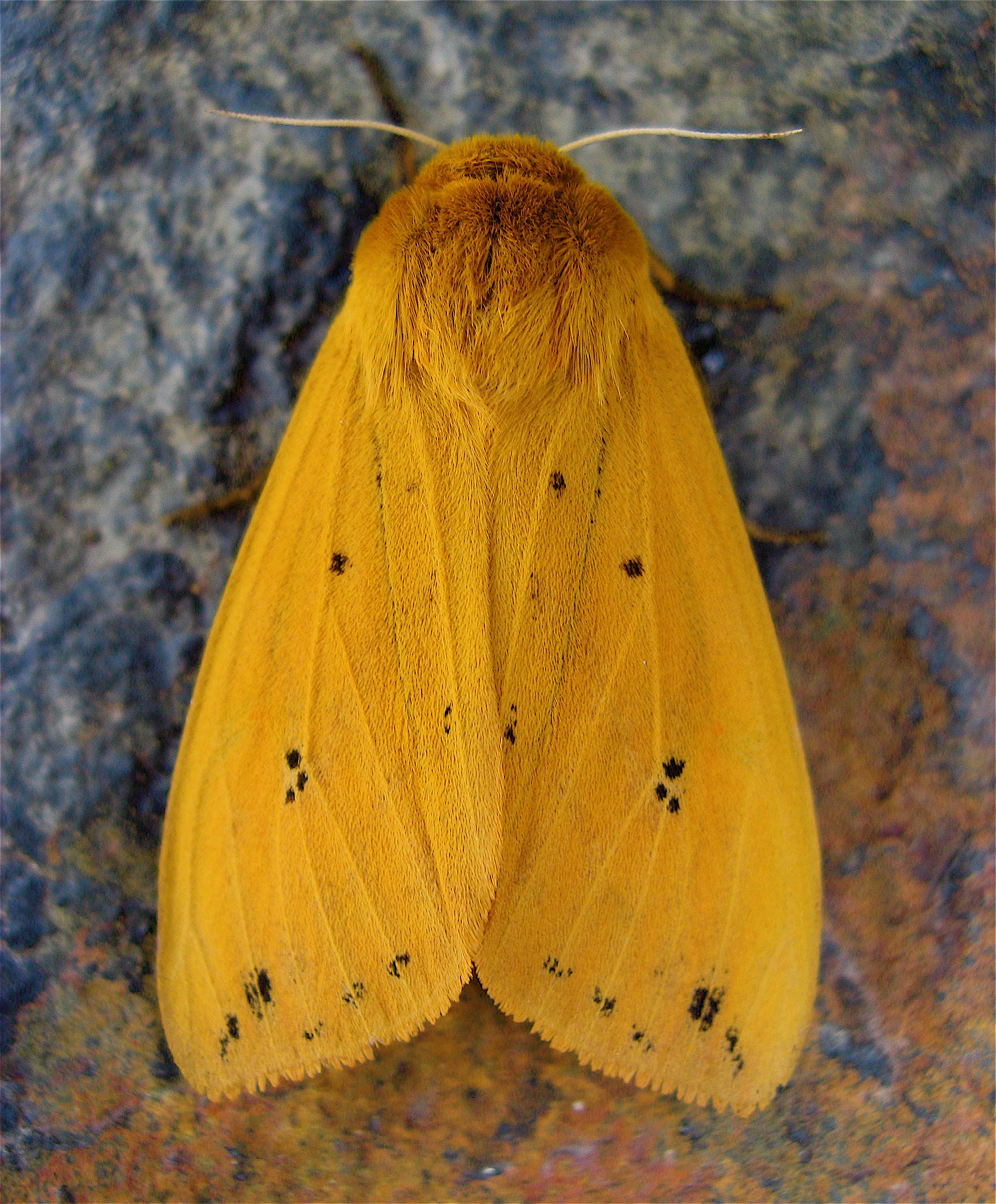
Adult

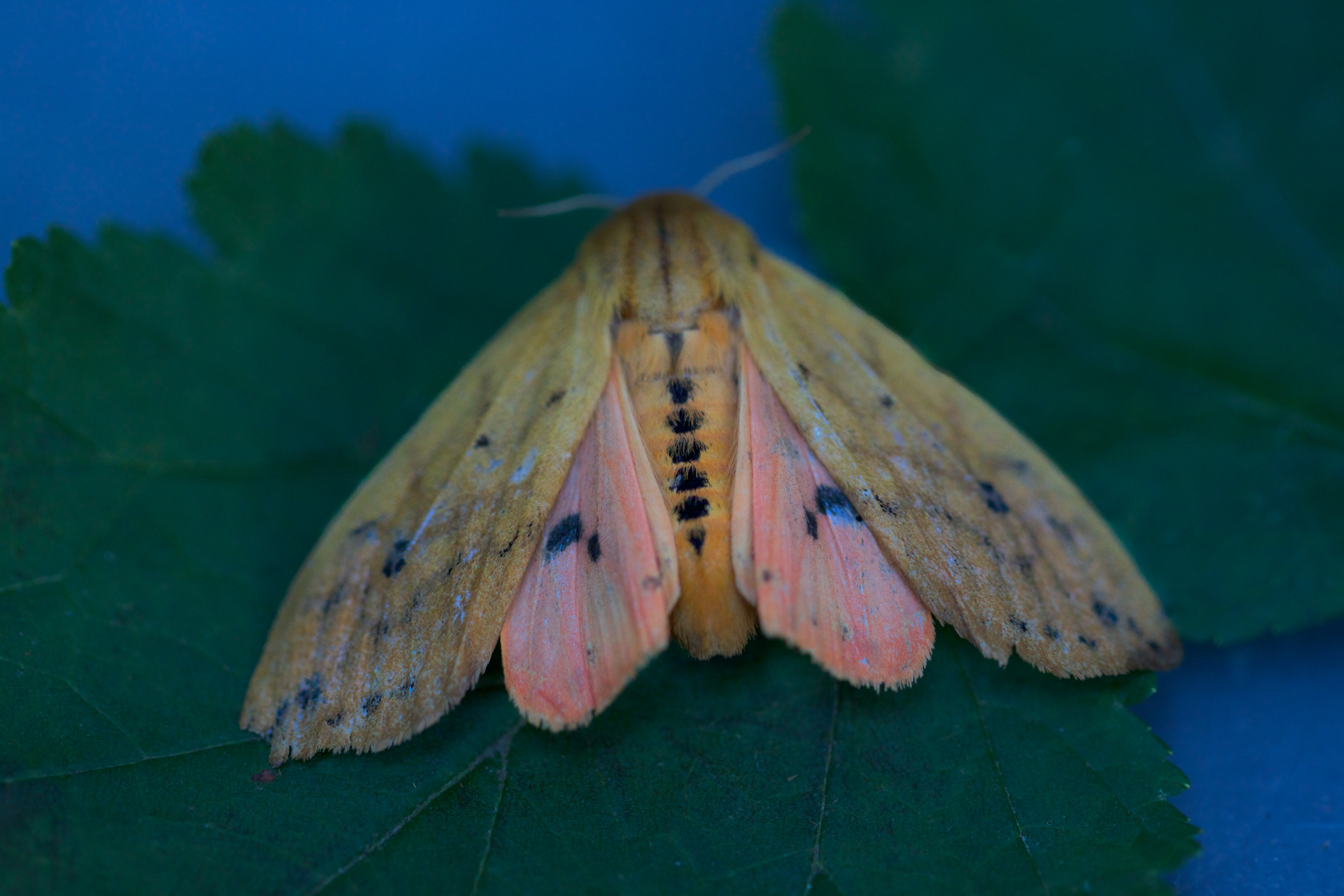
Isabella tiger moth with hindwings

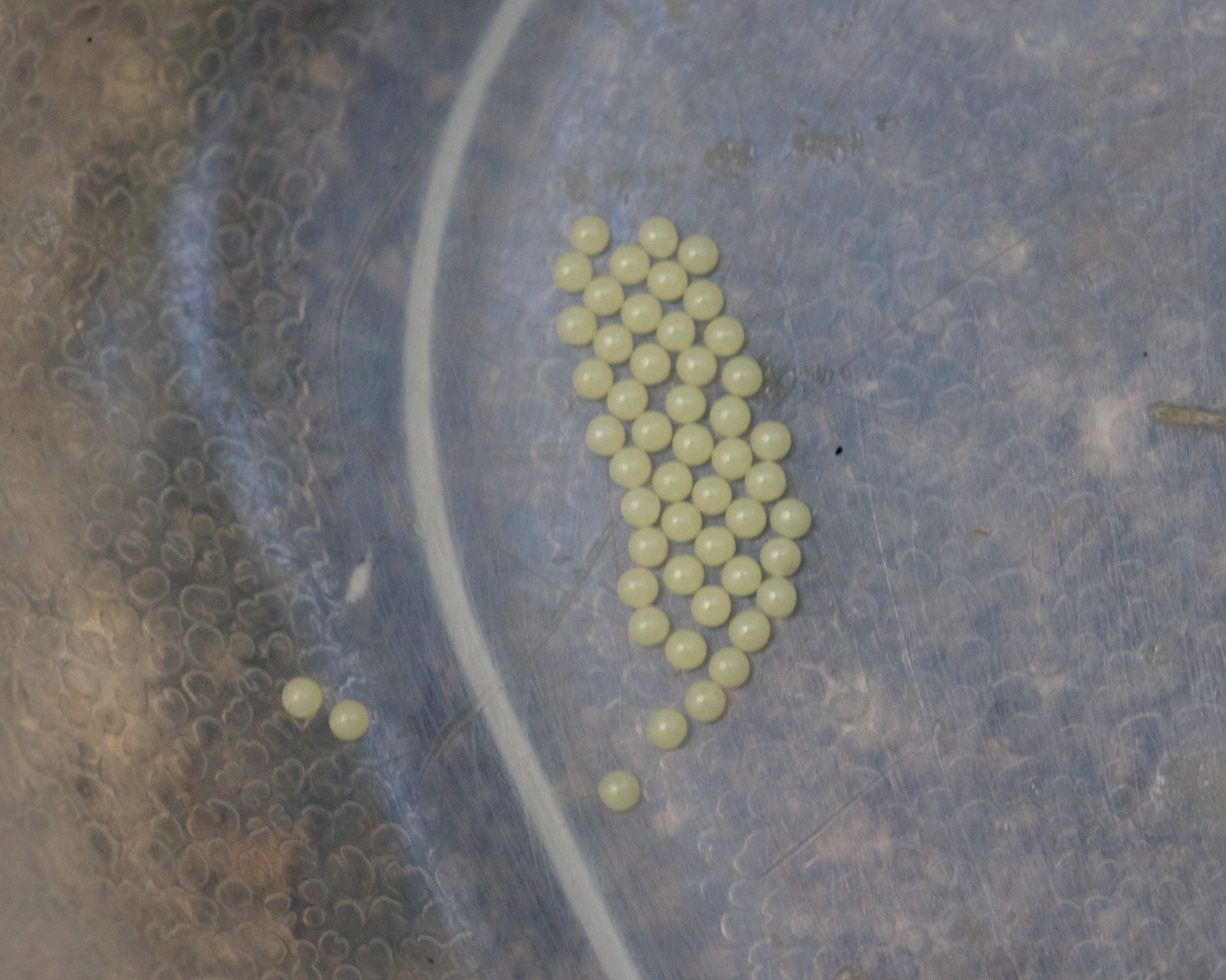
Fresh laid Isabella tiger moth eggs

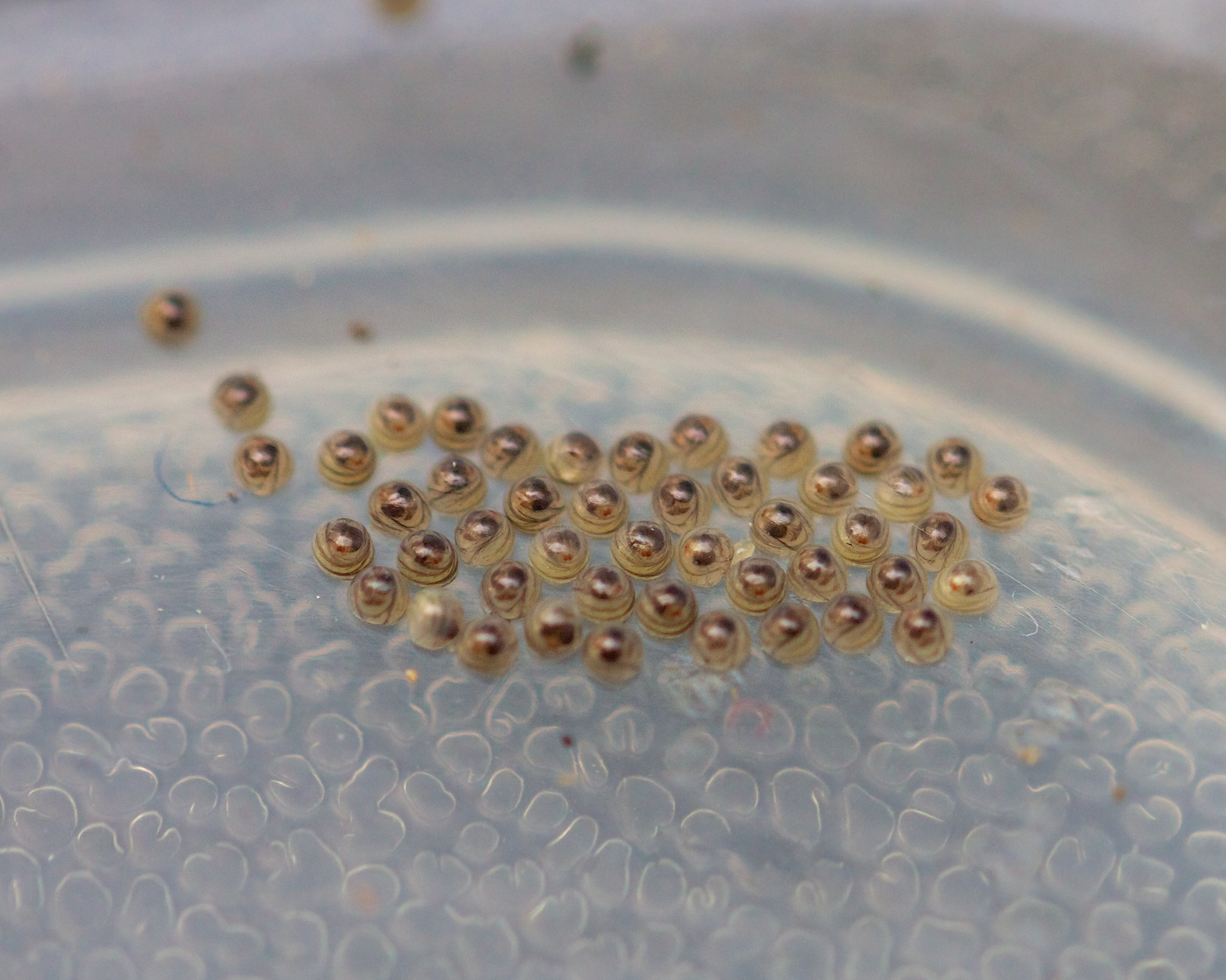
Mature Isabella tiger moth eggs

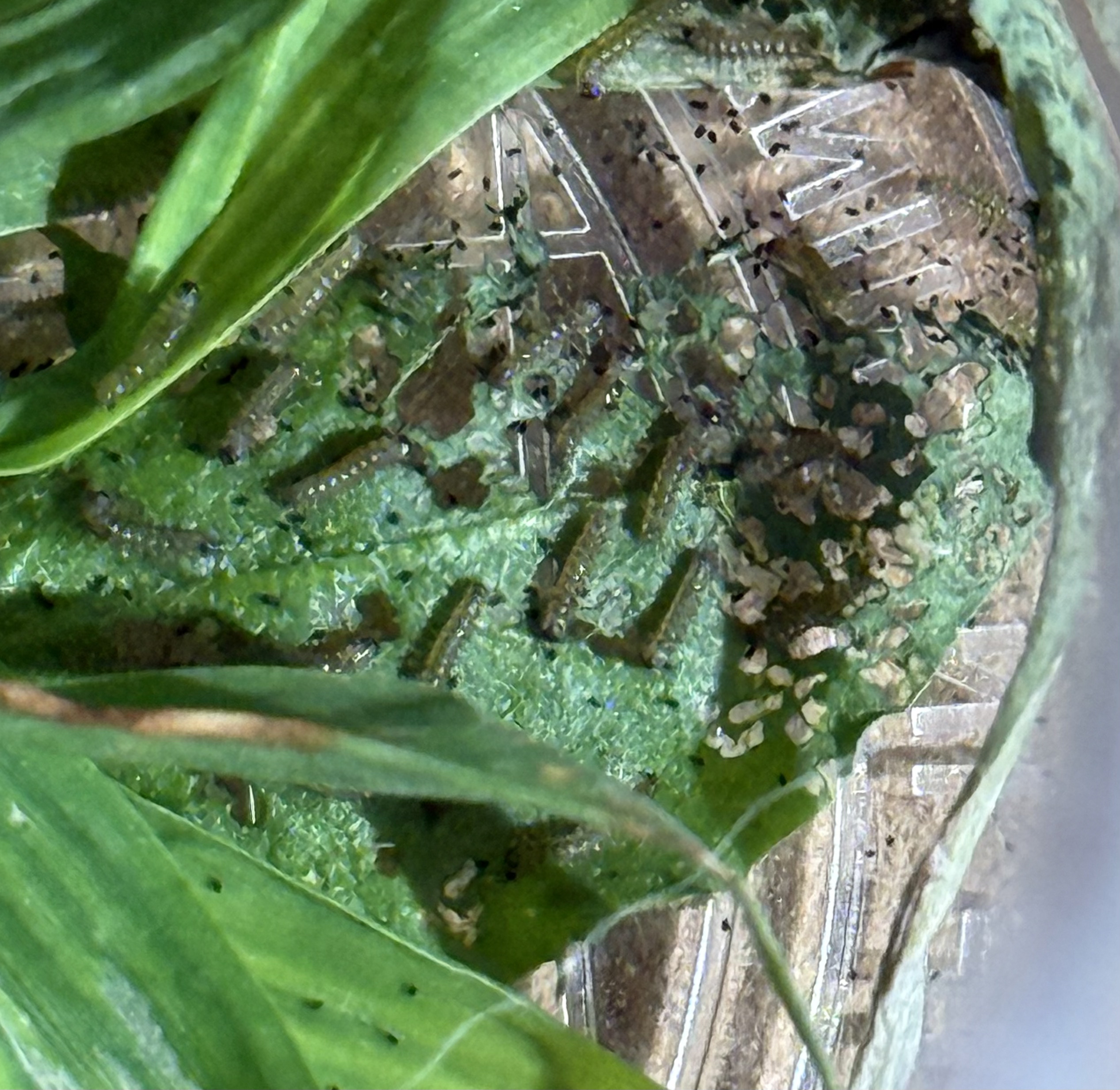
Freshly hatched isabella tiger moth caterpillars alongside a bunch of frass

== Diet ==
Caterpillar foraging

Woolly bear

This species is a generalist feeder, consuming many plant species, including herbs and trees. Based on the caterpillars' wide range of food plants, this moth could be found almost anywhere that plants grow.

== Related species ==
Singer et al. showed that the larvae of a related moth, Apantesis incorrupta (whose larvae are also called "woollybears"), consume alkaloid-laden leaves that help fight off internal parasitic fly larvae. This phenomenon has been proposed to be "the first clear demonstration of self-medication among insects." Within the same family, the larvae of the garden tiger moth (Arctia caja) are also known as woollybear caterpillars and consume an alkaloid diet similar to Apantesis incorrupta.

== In culture ==
=== Folklore ===
Canadian and U.S. folklore holds that the relative amounts of brown and black hair on a larva indicate the severity of the coming winter. It is believed that if a Pyrrharctia isabella's brown band is wide, winter weather will be mild, and if the brown band is narrow, the winter will be severe. In a variation of this story, the color of stripes predicts the winter weather, with darker stripes indicating a harsher winter. In reality, hatchlings from the same clutch of eggs can display considerable variation in their color banding, and a larva's brown band tends to widen with age as it molts.

Another version of this belief is that the direction in which a Pyrrharctia isabella crawls indicates the winter weather, with the caterpillar crawling south to escape colder weather. There is no scientific evidence for winter weather prediction by Pyrrharctia isabella.

=== Woolly bear festivals ===
Woolly bear festivals are held in several locations in the fall.

- Vermilion, Ohio, in October, begun in 1973, the Woollybear Festival features woolly bear costume contests for children and pets and the "Woollybear 500" caterpillar races.
- Banner Elk, North Carolina, begun in 1977, the Woolly Worm Festival features crafts, food, and races. The winning woolly bear predicts the winter weather for the following winter.
- Beattyville, Kentucky, begun 1988, called the Woolly Worm Festival, features food, vendors, live music, and a Woolly Worm Race in which people race the woolly bear caterpillar up vertical strings.
- Oil City, Pennsylvania, Woolley Bear Jamboree, begun in 2008, features Oil Valley Vick to predict the winter weather.
- Little Valley, New York, has held a Woolly Bear Weekend since 2012.
