= Green, Ohio =

- City
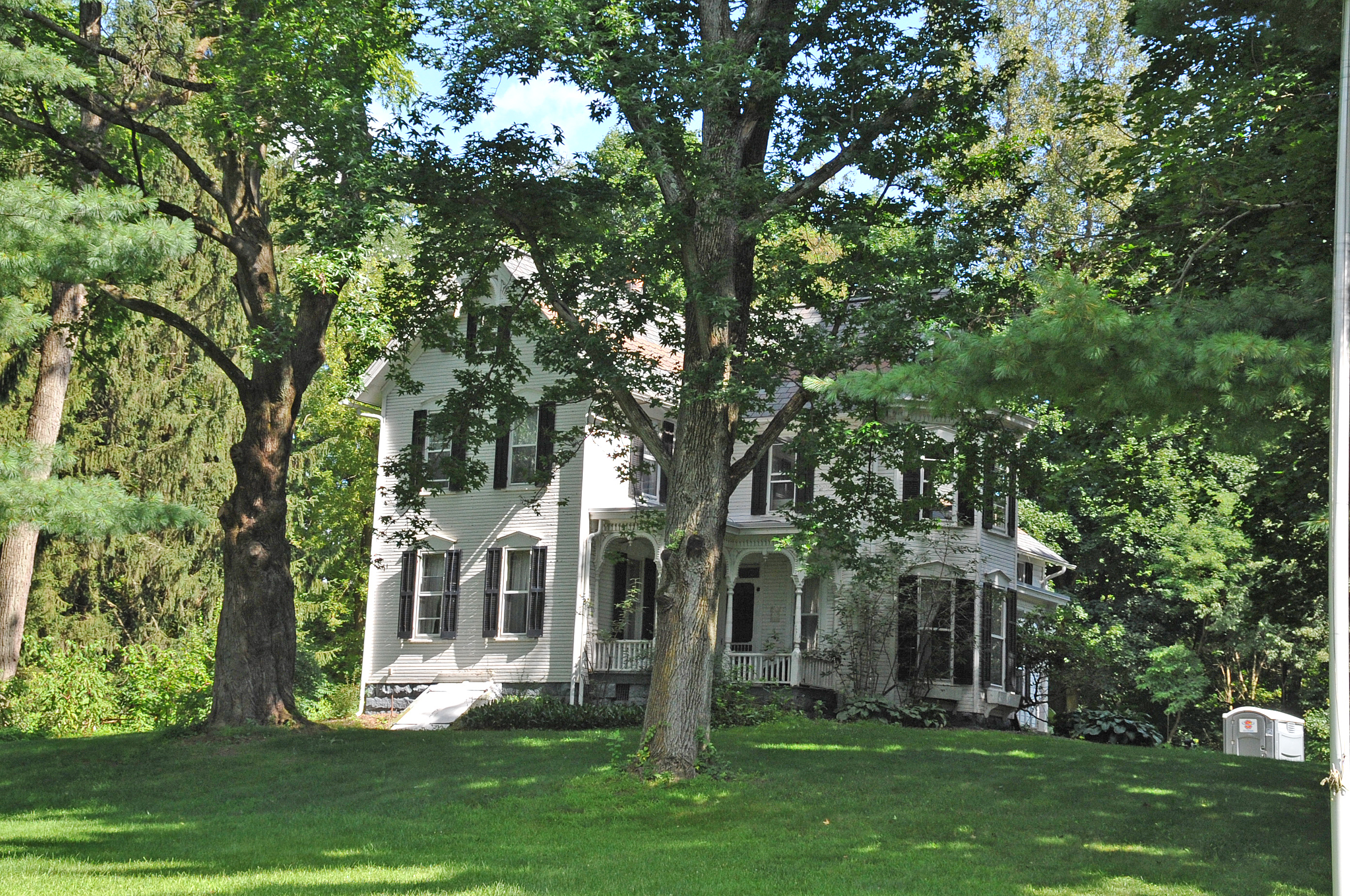
- Levi J. Hartong Farmhouse

- Flag Seal Logo
- Motto(s): "A township from the past, a city of the future"
- Interactive map of Green, Ohio
- Location within Ohio Location within the United States
- Coordinates: 40°56′54″N 81°29′32″W
- Country: United States
- State: Ohio
- County: Summit
- Established: 1992

Government
  - Type: Mayor–council
  - Mayor: Rocco P. Yeargin

Area
  - Total: 33.53 sq mi (86.84 km^{2})
  - Land: 32.03 sq mi (82.96 km^{2})
  - Water: 1.50 sq mi (3.88 km^{2})
- Elevation: 1,198 ft (365 m)

Population (2020)
  - Total: 27,475
  - Estimate (2023): 27,338
  - Density: 857.7/sq mi (331.17/km^{2})
- Time zone: UTC-5 (Eastern (EST))
  - Summer (DST): UTC-4 (EDT)
- ZIP code: 44232, 44312, 44319, 44685, 44216
- Area code: 330
- FIPS code: 39-31860
- GNIS feature ID: 2394973
- Website: https://www.cityofgreen.org/

Green is a city in southeastern Summit County, Ohio, United States. The population was 27,475 at the 2020 census. It is a suburban community between Akron and Canton and is part of the Akron metropolitan area.

== History ==
Green Township was first created in 1809 as part of Stark County. Green Township became part of Summit County after that county's establishment in 1840. Green had several unincorporated hamlets, most notably Greensburg. By 1900, five unincorporated settlements were in Green Township, surrounded by farmlands with valuable crops and areas of coal. The local economy transitioned from farming to business and manufacturing. By 1950, farmers began to sell their lands to developers for residential housing. The increased development in the community led to discussions about becoming a city. Voters approved the merger of the village with the rest of the township in 1991. In the beginning of 1991, Green Township was incorporated as the Village of Green. The village was declared a city in 1992, with the first city mayor being John Torok.

In 2016, Green initiated a legal battle against the NEXUS Pipeline, which runs close to residential neighborhoods, endangered wetlands, and the Comet Lake Dam. Construction began in 2018 after a settlement of $7.5 million was reached with the city's government.

=== Green during America's wars ===
During the early years of Green's settlements was the beginning of the War of 1812, where Green residents John and Andrew Kepler, John Dixon and Peter Buchtel served in the war. During the American Civil War, Green supplied 176 men, with 26 of them becoming casualties. Most notably were relatives of some of Green's founders, Joel Franks, John W. Steese, William Hartong and Isaac and William Weaver. World War I, World War II, the Korean War, the Vietnam War, the Gulf War and the War on Terrorism all saw extensive amounts of soldiers from Green.

== Geography ==
According to the United States Census Bureau, the city has a total area of 33.54 square miles (86.87 km^{2}), of which 32.06 square miles (83.04 km^{2}) is land and 1.48 square miles (3.83 km^{2}) is water.

== Demographics ==
Historical population
Census	Pop.	Note	%±
1990	3,553		—
2000	22,817		542.2%
2010	25,699		12.6%
2020	27,475		6.9%
2025 (est.)	27,553		0.3%

=== 2020 census ===
As of the 2020 census, Green had a population of 27,475. The median age was 43.1 years. 22.2% of residents were under the age of 18 and 20.0% of residents were 65 years of age or older. For every 100 females there were 95.2 males, and for every 100 females age 18 and over there were 93.3 males age 18 and over.

99.2% of residents lived in urban areas, while 0.8% lived in rural areas.

There were 11,195 households in Green, of which 29.7% had children under the age of 18 living in them. Of all households, 53.8% were married-couple households, 16.1% were households with a male householder and no spouse or partner present, and 24.0% were households with a female householder and no spouse or partner present. About 26.7% of all households were made up of individuals and 12.6% had someone living alone who was 65 years of age or older.

There were 11,825 housing units, of which 5.3% were vacant. The homeowner vacancy rate was 1.2% and the rental vacancy rate was 5.1%.

Racial composition as of the 2020 census
Race	Number	Percent
White	24,595	89.5%
Black or African American	722	2.6%
American Indian and Alaska Native	30	0.1%
Asian	545	2.0%
Native Hawaiian and Other Pacific Islander	7	0.0%
Some other race	134	0.5%
Two or more races	1,442	5.2%
Hispanic or Latino (of any race)	496	1.8%

=== 2010 census ===
As of the 2010 census, there were 25,699 people, 10,070 households, and 7,217 families residing in the city. The population density was 801.6 inhabitants per square mile (309.5/km^{2}). There were 10,858 housing units at an average density of 338.7 per square mile (130.8/km^{2}). The racial makeup of the city was 95.0% White, 1.8% African American, 0.2% Native American, 1.5% Asian, 0.2% from other races, and 1.2% from two or more races. Hispanic or Latino of any race were 1.2% of the population.

There were 10,070 households, of which 33.5% had children under the age of 18 living with them, 57.5% were married couples living together, 10.0% had a female householder with no husband present, 4.3% had a male householder with no wife present, and 28.3% were non-families. 23.9% of all households were made up of individuals, and 9.9% had someone living alone who was 65 years of age or older. The average household size was 2.54 and the average family size was 3.02.

The median age in the city was 41.8 years. 24.1% of residents were under the age of 18; 7.6% were between the ages of 18 and 24; 23.1% were from 25 to 44; 30.7% were from 45 to 64; and 14.5% were 65 years of age or older. The gender makeup of the city was 48.7% male and 51.3% female.

=== 2000 census ===
As of the 2000 census, there were 22,817 people, 8,742 households, and 6,425 families residing in the city. The population density was 711.7 inhabitants per square mile (274.8/km^{2}). There were 9,180 housing units at an average density of 286.3 per square mile (110.5/km^{2}). The racial makeup of the city was 97.52% White, 0.72% African American, 0.15% Native American, 0.78% Asian, 0.02% Pacific Islander, 0.12% from other races, and 0.69% from two or more races. Hispanic or Latino of any race were 0.49% of the population.

There were 8,742 households, out of which 34.2% had children under the age of 18 living with them, 61.3% were married couples living together, 8.9% had a female householder with no husband present, and 26.5% were non-families. 22.1% of all households were made up of individuals, and 7.9% had someone living alone who was 65 years of age or older. The average household size was 2.59 and the average family size was 3.05.

In the city, the population was spread out, with 26.1% under the age of 18, 6.7% from 18 to 24, 28.5% from 25 to 44, 26.2% from 45 to 64, and 12.6% who were 65 years of age or older. The median age was 39 years. For every 100 females, there were 97.6 males. For every 100 females age 18 and over, there were 94.0 males.

The median income for a household in the city was $54,133, and the median income for a family was $61,662. Males had a median income of $45,456 versus $28,725 for females. The per capita income for the city was $25,575. About 4.2% of families and 5.0% of the population were below the poverty line, including 7.5% of those under age 18 and 4.7% of those age 65 or over.

== Economy ==
According to Green's 2022 Annual Comprehensive Financial Report, the largest employers in the city at the time were:

#	Employer	# of Employees
1	Green Local School District	632
2	Summa Health System	555
3	Fannie May Confection	550
4	Fedex Custom Critical	495
5	Diebold Nixdorf	427
6	Target Corp.	369
7	Tamarkin Company (Giant Eagle)	367
8	DRB Systems LLC	366
9	Minute Men, Inc.	351
10	Akron General Parners Inc. (Cleveland Clinic Akron General)	338

== Arts and culture ==
The flag of Green was created as a result of a contest targeted towards school-age residents.

== Parks and recreation ==
Singer Lake Bog, a nature preserve, is located in the city.

Boettler Park is also located in Green. Originally owned by a wealthy industrialist, the land was donated to the city of Green to be used for public recreation. Today, the 26-acre (11 ha) park is a popular recreational area with trails and various outdoor activities like fishing, hiking, picnicking, and biking.

== Government ==
The City of Green is governed by a mayor and a 7-member city council. The mayor and three members of Council are elected at-large, while four council members are elected from wards. The mayor and all council members are limited to two consecutive, four-year terms. As of 2025, the mayor is Rocco Yeargin.

Federally, Green is represented in the United States Senate by Ohio Senators Jon Husted (R) and Bernie Moreno (R). They are represented in the United States House of Representatives by Congresswoman Emilia Sykes (D).

In the Ohio Senate, Green is represented by Republican Kristina Roegner. Jack Daniels (R) represents Green in the Ohio House of Representatives.

== Education ==
The city is served by Green Local Schools.

== Infrastructure ==
The city is served by the I-77 highway.

=== Transportation ===
In 2009, the city opened the first two-lane roundabout in Summit County. As of 2024, there are 11 roundabouts in the city.

The Akron-Canton Regional Airport is located in Green and Jackson Township.

== Notable people ==
- Kelsie Ahbe, Olympic track and field athlete
- Rachel Cargle, American activist, public speaker, and author
- Mark Croghan, Olympic track and field athlete
- Christian DiLauro, professional football player in the NFL
- Dick Goddard, late former meteorologist for WJW
- Heather Kozar, 1999 Playboy Playmate of the Year
- David Lough, former professional baseball player
- Mary Taylor, former Lieutenant Governor of Ohio

== Sister cities ==
Green became a sister city with Beiuș, Romania, in 2018.
