= Doug Adair =

American television news anchor and journalist (1929–2019)

Doug Adair (May 29, 1929 – April 29, 2019) was an American television news anchor and journalist who worked in the Cleveland, Columbus, and Dayton, Ohio markets.

== Career ==
Born in Xenia, Ohio, Adair got his start in journalism in television in Dayton in the early 1950s. In 1958 he moved to Cleveland and joined then-CBS-affiliated WJW-TV as a reporter and anchor. Starting in 1964, Adair was paired with Joel Daly and the duo co-anchored City Camera News, the first two-man television newscast in Cleveland. City Camera News was notable for equipping reporters with Polaroid instant cameras, allowing them to take pictures that can be used on the air. The format was successful, and the Adair/Daly team anchored the most-watched newscast in Cleveland. Both men were offered jobs at WLS-TV in Chicago around 1968; Adair chose to stay in Cleveland while Daly accepted. During his time at WJW-TV, Adair's colleagues also included Ernie Anderson, who played horror movie host "Ghoulardi"; Tim Conway, future co-star of McHale's Navy and The Carol Burnett Show; legendary Cleveland meteorologist Dick Goddard; and Bob "Hoolihan" Wells and "Big Chuck" Schodowski, the duo whose Hoolihan and Big Chuck movie show replaced Anderson's "Ghoulardi."

In 1970 Adair left WJW-TV and joined NBC News as co-anchor of the evening news programs at network-owned WKYC-TV. While at WKYC, Adair worked with notable co-anchors Virgil Dominic, Dave Patterson, and Judd Hambrick; future Today Show meteorologist Al Roker; and Mona Scott, a reporter-turned-weathercaster-turned anchor who would later become his second wife.

In early 1983, Adair moved to Columbus to assume anchor duties at WCMH-TV, that city's NBC affiliate. Mona Scott joined him several months later, and their on-air partnership catapulted WCMH's evening newscasts to the most-watched in Columbus. However, the couple divorced—both on-air and off-air—in 1990. Adair remained at WCMH until 1994, when he retired from television news. Adair was inducted in the Broadcasters Hall of Fame in 1992.

== Personal life ==
Adair was married three times. His first marriage produced three children, and his marriage to former colleague Mona Scott gave him two stepchildren. His third wife, Jean, is a former Roman Catholic nun, and they resided for many years in the Dublin, Ohio area. Adair was involved in harness racing and owned horses. He died in Pleasanton, California in 2019 at the age of 89.
