= Son of Ghoul =

Keven Scarpino as the Son of Ghoul

The Son of Ghoul is a horror host played by Keven Scarpino, appearing on The Son of Ghoul Show based in Akron, Ohio, where a B movie is presented along with comedy sketches. In 2020, he was inducted into the Rondo Hatton Classic Horror Awards' Monster Kid Hall of Fame.

== History ==
Scarpino's original inspiration came from Ernie Anderson's popular 1960s host character Ghoulardi. At a 1982 look-alike contest sponsored by Anderson's successor, The Ghoul (played by Ron Sweed), Scarpino won first prize and was given the title, "Son of Ghoul" by Sweed himself. Shortly thereafter, he began working at WOAC in Canton, Ohio, where he became familiar with The Cool Ghoul, another Ghoulardi-inspired television host played by George Cavender. Scarpino was hired as a technician on Cavender's show, "Thriller Theater", and was later given small parts in sketches.

Cavender departed WOAC and Thriller Theater in 1986, and Scarpino auditioned along with others to become the show's next host. He got the job, and later renamed it The Son of Ghoul Show. In 1995, WOAC was sold and switched to a home-shopping format, and Scarpino moved the show to the relatively new WAOH-LP, where the show was based until 2022.

As of March 2019, the show started airing on Canton's WIVM TV-39 & WIVX TV-13 and WIVN TV-29 in Newcomerstown. Via WIVM, it is carried on Spectrum Cable channel 989 in the Stark county area and channel 15 in Tuscarawas, Holmes & Carroll counties in Ohio. MCTV Massillon Wooster Cable carry WIVM as well on channel 128. The Son of Ghoul can be streamed via the Internet through the Livestream website and selecting the WIVM Live Stream. The Son of Ghoul Show is broadcast Saturday and Sunday from 8PM to 10PM Eastern Time.

== Lawsuit ==
In the late 1980s, Ron Sweed sued Scarpino, alleging that Scarpino stole Sweed's character. The lawsuit was dismissed on the grounds that the character similarities (e.g. their ghoulish appearance and hosting style) were too broad to be protected.

== Sidekicks ==
Scarpino's long-time sidekick was Ron "Fidge" Huffman, known for having dwarfism. Huffman died of alcohol poisoning in 2003, and his place was taken by "Jungle Bob".

== See also ==
- Ron Sweed
- Ghoulardi
- Big Chuck and Lil' John
