= Ron Sweed =

American television personality and comedian (1949–2019)

- Born: January 23, 1949; Euclid, Ohio, U.S.
- Died: April 1, 2019 (aged 70); Cleveland, Ohio, U.S.
- Education: Bowling Green State University
- Occupations: Horror host; disc jockey; producer; comedian; author
- Years active: 1963–2019
- Spouses: Barbara J. King (m. ????–????); Mary Therese Matousek (m. c. 1993–2019)
- Website: theghoul.com

Ronald D. Sweed (January 23, 1949 – April 1, 2019) was an American horror host, disc jockey, producer, comedian, and author, known for his late-night television horror host character "The Ghoul".

== Early life and career ==
Sweed was born on January 23, 1949, in Euclid, Ohio. His mother is Irene Barnard. His father was Robert Sweed. He grew up in Cleveland. In an interview with his mother, Metro Times reporter Anita Schmaltz asked, "Did you ever expect to give birth to a Ghoul?" She responded, "Ron was very different right from the time he came out of the chute." Sweed was 3 or 4 when he went to downtown Cleveland with his grandfather to see Santa Claus and buy him a Christmas present. He picked out a puppet. When Sweed was 8 or 9, he was given marionettes. Sweed would put on shows for the neighborhood kids with the marionettes. His fourth grade teacher at one time could not keep his attention. Every Wednesday Sweed would put on a show for the class with his Jerry Mahoney dummy.

In 1963, 13-year-old Sweed and his friends went to an afternoon matinee of "Dr. Silkini and his live stage show of horrors, on stage in person, the Frankenstein monster, Dracula, King Kong and 45 horror movies". On the way home, he found a gorilla suit in an open trunk of Silkini's. He wore the gorilla suit to a live appearance by Ghoulardi, a popular Cleveland television personality played by Ernie Anderson on WJW. Ghoulardi took note of the costume and brought Sweed on stage, and over the next few weeks, Sweed became Anderson's production assistant.

After Anderson left Cleveland for Los Angeles in 1966, Sweed left for Bowling Green State University, but continued to help with the production of the Hoolihan and Big Chuck show, which was Ghoulardi's replacement on WJW.

== The Ghoul Show ==
In 1970, Sweed approached Ernie Anderson with a proposal to revive Anderson's "Ghoulardi" character. Anderson was not interested, but gave Sweed his blessing to revive the character on his own. With that blessing, Sweed took "The Ghoul" to Cleveland's Kaiser Broadcasting station WKBF-TV (channel 61) in 1971. Though it started as a tribute to Ghoulardi, Sweed soon developed his own eye-catching gags and energetic style. Known for his zany, early-adolescent humor (particularly surrounding his abuse of a rubber frog named "Froggy," his well-known penchant for blowing up model ships and aircraft with firecrackers, and his habitual smearing of Cheez Whiz over everything in sight), late night monster movies were a unique experience for Cleveland viewers in the 1970s. Catch phrases included "zingy-zingy," "Overdey!" and "stay sick, turn blue".

The Ghoul frequently inserted audio clips into movie segments culled from novelty records, George Carlin, Firesign Theater and rock albums of the '60s and early '70s. Additionally, The Ghoul would insert sound effects such as belching sounds at moments when a character took a drink of something on-screen.

"Shooting from no-budget studio sets, the Ghoul inserted his own dialogue and sound effects over insufferably bad B movies, blew up food, model cars and figurines with firecrackers, and produced strangely compelling, culturally relevant skits and parodies. The show was destructive and childish enough for little kids, subversive and timely enough for young adults."

Later in the 1970s, Kaiser Broadcasting syndicated The Ghoul Show to Detroit, Chicago, Boston, Philadelphia, San Francisco and Los Angeles. It bombed in Chicago—replacing the locally produced Svengoolie hosted by Jerry G. Bishop—and in Boston, but found success in Detroit at WKBD (channel 50) and enjoyed varying degrees of success in the other markets. Despite the show's popularity, Kaiser eventually canceled it in 1975 amid complaints from parents about the content of some of Sweed's skits, as well as the permanent closure of WKBF by Kaiser itself. But The Ghoul Show resurfaced on independent Detroit station WXON (channel 20) from 1977 to 1979, followed by a brief stint at WGPR-TV (channel 62) for several months in 1979. WKBF-TV's successor station WCLQ-TV (channel 61) revived the show from 1982 until the spring of 1984; this iteration of the show was also syndicated to WXON.

Sweed was on and off the air in Cleveland and Detroit for over three decades, at times even branching out into radio and the internet. The Ghoul returned to Cleveland TV in 1998 on WBNX-TV (channel 55) where he remained for the next six years airing on Friday, then later Sunday nights. He also did a Saturday night request show on classic rock station WNCX (98.5 FM) during the same time period.

The same year, Sweed co-authored (with Mike Olszewski) The Ghoul (S)crapbook (ISBN 978-1886228221), a book collecting memories, on-set photographs, transcripts, correspondence, and memos from his years on the air. Said Robert St Mary, a Detroit journalist and author of The Orbit Magazine Anthology: Re-Entry: "Ron understood that times had changed from the beatnik version of Ernie. It was spectacle. It was blowing stuff up. He was using the crazy hip lingo that Ernie had, and tweaking it a bit more."

In 2015, Sweed appeared at the Redford Theatre. It would be his final appearance there as he was scheduled to perform there in October 2018, but due to health problems, it was canceled. In an October 2017 interview with Metro Times Jarrett Koral, he stated how he gets ready for a show: "smoke a good kielbasa," further remarking that "smoking a kielbasa will take you to places Steppenwolf never imagined on his magic carpet ride." For a boost of instant insanity? "Snort a couple blobs of Cheez Whiz."

== Influence ==
The Ghoul was well known enough in the Cleveland and Detroit markets that some of his catch phrases ("Overdey!", "Hey group!", "Plunk your magic twanger, Froggy!", "Holy Parma", "Amrap" (Parma spelled backwards) and Froggy's "Hiya gang, hiya hiya hiya!") are still widely recognized among the children of the 1970s, as well as various portions of his show's signoff: "Stay sick, turn blue, scratch glass, climb walls, but most importantly of all, do it while you can, but don't get caught!".

An interesting side element is that the aforementioned rubber toy referred to simply as "Froggy" (and much abused by the Ghoul) was a toy dating from 1948 by a company named Rempel and featured often in comedic skits on the 1955 television show Andy's Gang where he was named Froggy the Gremlin. The Ghoul's oft-uttered catch phrases "Hiya, gang. Hiya, hiya, hiya" and "Plunk your magic twanger, Froggy" originate from that earlier show.

== Awards and honors ==
On March 5, 2016, Sweed was presented with a Certificate of Recognition by Cleveland mayor Frank G. Jackson to commemorate the 45th anniversary of his debut on Cleveland TV, and to honor his continuing popularity in the city.

In 2020, he was inducted into the Rondo Hatton Classic Horror Awards' Monster Kid Hall of Fame.

At (41.3893267, -81.5110244) on I271 Northbound side is a blue sign {ADOPT A HIGHWAY, LITTER CONTROL, IN MEMORY OF, RON, “THE GHOUL" SWEED}

== Lawsuit ==
Sweed sued Keven Scarpino, a.k.a. the Son of Ghoul, in 1987 for infringing upon The Ghoul's character, but eventually lost the case. The judge ruled that no infringement occurred, as most horror show hosts portrayed the same basic character - a ghoulish individual who pranced about in costume, performed comedy routines, and showed horror movies.

== Personal life and death ==
Sweed met his first wife, Barbara J. King, when she was 17, and he was 18. They were married for 14 years, and remained friends after divorcing. Sweed met Mary Therese Matousek in 1988, and married her around 1993; they were married for 26 years.

Sweed died on April 1, 2019, five months after suffering a massive heart attack. He had undergone triple bypass surgery on November 7, 2018.
