= Larry Lujack =

American radio DJ (1940–2013)

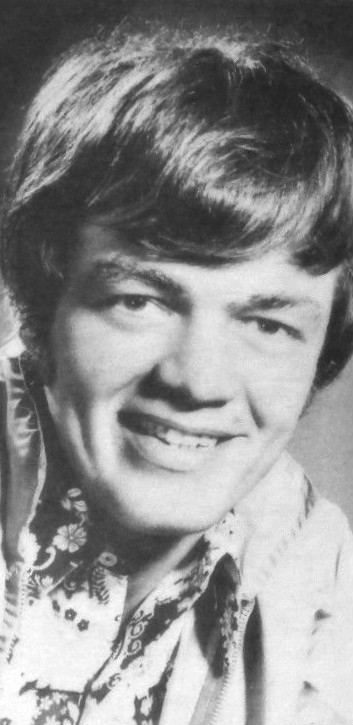
- Lujack at WCFL in 1974
- Born: Larry Lee Blankenburg; June 6, 1940; Quasqueton, Iowa, U.S.
- Died: December 18, 2013 (aged 73); Santa Fe, New Mexico, U.S.
- Other names: Superjock, Lawrence of Chicago, UncleLar, King of the Corn Belt
- Education: College of Idaho; Washington State University
- Occupations: Radio host, disc jockey
- Spouse(s): Gina (div.); Judith Seguin (m. c.1972–2013; his death)
- Awards: Illinois Broadcasters Association's Hall of Fame (2002); National Association of Broadcasters Hall of Fame (2008)

Larry Lujack (born Larry Lee Blankenburg; June 6, 1940 – December 18, 2013), also called Superjock, Lawrence of Chicago, Charming and Delightful Ol' Uncle Lar, and King of the Corn Belt, was an American Top 40 music radio disc jockey known for his world-weary, sarcastic style. Some of his more popular routines included Klunk Letter of the Day, the darkly humorous Animal Stories with sidekick Tommy Edwards as Little Tommy, and the Cheap Trashy Show Biz Report.

== Professional life ==
Lujack came to Chicago to work for WCFL-AM. He spent a few months there before being hired at WLS. While at WCFL, Lujack closed the air studio curtains during public visiting hours.

His Animal Stories routine came about because WLS was still receiving farm magazines long after the station changed to a rock-music format in 1960. Lujack started reading some of them and began airing stories from them instead of reading the grain reports connected with the Farm Report. When the Farm Report was officially discontinued, the feature became Animal Stories. A perfectionist about his work, Lujack would review every word he spoke on the air after each broadcast by listening to an audio cassette skimmer tape which recorded only when the microphone was open.

Lujack retired in 1987, shortly after his son John from his first marriage died in an accident. In 1997, Lujack moved from Palatine, Illinois, to the outskirts of Santa Fe, New Mexico, and, in May 2000, began working again, for then-WUBT (WKSC-FM) in Chicago, via a remote Integrated Services Digital Network (ISDN) link from a New Mexico recording studio, teaming up with Matt McCann who was based in the Chicago studio. The ratings for the show out-paced the rest of the radio station. In 2003, he reteamed with his Animal Stories partner, Tommy Edwards (Little "Snot-Nosed" Tommy), on WRLL (1690 AM) in Chicago, to broadcast his signature features on weekday mornings. On August 16, 2006, Lujack was terminated with the entire WRLL on-air staff as it was announced that the station's Real Oldies format would cease on September 17, 2006. The broadcast duo were on the air once again as part of the WLS "The Big 89 Rewind" on Memorial Day, 2007 and 2008 when the station returned to its MusicRadio programming, featuring many of the former WLS personalities and special guests, other DJs, etc.

Lujack was inducted into the Illinois Broadcasters Association's Hall of Fame in June 2002, the National Radio Hall of Fame on November 6, 2004, and the National Association of Broadcasters Hall of Fame on April 15, 2008, during their annual convention in Las Vegas.

== Personal life ==
Born in Quasqueton, Iowa, as Larry Lee Blankenburg, the family moved to Caldwell, Idaho, when he was 13. He later changed his last name to that of his football idol, Johnny Lujack. He attended the College of Idaho in Caldwell, Idaho, and Washington State University and was a radio disc jockey, starting in 1958, at KCID in Caldwell. His entry into radio while a biology major at College of Idaho was a matter of finances; at the time he was looking for a part-time job. He originally intended to go into wildlife conservation. He subsequently worked at several other radio stations, including KJR (AM) in Seattle, but is best known for his antics on Chicago AM radio stations WLS and WCFL.

Lujack had three children from his first marriage and a stepson from his second.

Away from the job, he was a golf enthusiast. After triple coronary artery bypass surgery in 1991, Lujack marked his calendar for the date his doctor told him he could return to the sport. Not just a "fair weather" golfer, Lujack suited up in winter clothing and snowshoes to play Chicago area golf courses in winter. On January 23, 1985, he played a full 18 holes at Buffalo Grove, Illinois; the temperature was 27 degrees below zero with a windchill of -75 degrees. Lujack collapsed afterward.

Lujack, a heavy smoker who lived in fear of getting lung cancer, died December 18, 2013, at home in Santa Fe, New Mexico, under the care of his wife Judith with the help of in-home hospice of esophageal cancer, caused by untreated gastroesophageal reflux disease (GERD) which was likely exacerbated by his excessive coffee consumption.

== Radio stations ==
Station	City	State	Dates	Notes
KCID 1490	Caldwell	ID	1958	
KGEM 1140	Boise	ID	?	
KNEW^{*} 790	Spokane	WA	1963	
KPEG 1380	Spokane	WA	1963	
KRPL 1400	Moscow	ID	?	
KFXM (AM) 590	San Bernardino	CA	1963	Morning Drive, All Nights
KJRB 790	Spokane	WA	1962 – 1963	evenings (Note: KNEW and KJRB refer to the same radio station.)
KJR (AM) 950	Seattle	WA	April 1964 – September 1966	
WMEX (AM) 1510	Boston	MA	September 1966 – December 1966	as "Johnny Lujack"
WCFL (AM) 1000	Chicago	IL	1967	four months; all-nights
WLS (AM) 890	Chicago	IL	August 1967 – July 1972	afternoons, then mornings
WCFL (AM) 1000	Chicago	IL	July 3, 1972 – March 16, 1976	afternoons (Note: After WCFL switched to beautiful music format in 1976, Lujack remained on staff, as he had a high-paying contract. When WLS made him an offer to return to work there, the two stations each paid half of Lujack's remaining WCFL contract.)
WLS (AM) 890; WLS-FM 94.7	Chicago	IL	September 16, 1976 – August 28, 1987	mornings; then in 1985, afternoons (Note: WLS continued to pay Lujack for five years after his 1987 departure to keep him from competing with them in markets where ABC had local radio outlets.)
WUBT 103.5	Chicago	IL	May 25, 2000 – January 10, 2001	
WRLL 1690	Chicago	IL	September 8, 2003 – August 15, 2006	

== Works ==
- Lujack, Larry; Jedlicka, Daniel A. (1975). Superjock: The Loud, Frantic, Nonstop World of a Rock Radio DJ. Chicago, IL: H. Regnery Co.. ISBN 978-0-8092-8302-6 OCLC 1500182
- Lujack, Larry; Edwards, Tommy (1981). Animal Stories. Illustrated by Jözef Sumichrast. Chicago, IL: WLS.
- Lujack, Larry; Edwards, Tommy (1982). Animal Stories Volume II. Illustrated by Glen Arvidson. Chicago, IL: WLS.
- Lujack, Larry; Edwards, Tommy (1983). Animal Stories Vol. III. Illustrated by John Youssi. Chicago, IL: WLS.
- Lujack, Larry; Edwards, Tommy (2007). Uncle Lar' & Li'l Tommy's Best of Animal Stories. Lake Forest, IL: Animal Stories. OCLC 232150780
