= WDDD =

WDDD may refer to:

- WDDD-FM, a radio station (107.3 FM) licensed to Johnston City, Illinois, United States
- WDDD (AM), a defunct radio station (810 AM) formerly licensed to Johnston City, Illinois, United States
