= WRLL (1690 AM) =

Oldies radio station in Berwyn, Illinois, United States (2003–2006)

- Berwyn, Illinois; United States
- Broadcast area: Chicago market
- Frequency: 1690 kHz
- Branding: Real Oldies 1690

Programming
- Format: Oldies

Ownership
- Owner: Clear Channel Communications

History
- First air date: October 2003
- Last air date: September 16, 2006
- Former call signs: WHTE (1998–2003); WRLL (2003–2006)

Technical information
- Licensing authority: FCC
- Facility ID: 87178
- Class: B
- Power: 10,000 watts (day); 1,000 watts (night)
- Transmitter coordinates: 41°44′14.12″N 87°42′4.18″W

Links
- Public license information: Public file; LMS

WRLL (1690 AM) was an oldies radio station licensed to Berwyn, Illinois, United States, serving the Chicago market. It was owned and operated by Clear Channel Communications. The station's transmitter was located in Chicago's Ashburn neighborhood, near the Evergreen Park, Illinois border, and operated as a diplexed operation from one of the towers of its sister station, WGRB. The station ran 10,000 watts during the day, and 1,000 watts at night, using a non-directional antenna.

== History ==
The station originated as the expanded band "twin" of an existing station on the standard AM band. On March 17, 1997, the Federal Communications Commission (FCC) announced that 88 stations had been given permission to move to newly available "expanded band" transmitting frequencies, ranging from 1610 to 1700 kHz, with WDDD in Johnston City, Illinois, authorized to move from 810 to 1690 kHz.

A construction permit for the expanded band station was assigned the call letters WHTE on June 5, 1998. The FCC's initial policy was that both the original station and its expanded band counterpart could operate simultaneously for up to five years, after which owners would have to turn in one of the two licenses, depending on whether they preferred the new assignment or elected to remain on the original frequency, although this deadline was extended multiple times. The FCC also had a general policy that both an original standard band station and its expanded band counterpart had to remain under common ownership. In 2008 Clear Channel Communications requested a waiver in order to sell WDDD on 810 AM, but not the station on 1690 AM, to Withers Broadcasting of Southern Illinois, LLC. However, this request was denied, and on July 31, 2012, WDDD was deleted.

In most cases the expanded band station remained in the same market as the original standard band station. However, in 2003 the 1690 AM authorization was moved 280 miles (450 km) north to Berwyn by owner Clear Channel, in order to take advantage of the Chicago metropolitan area's greater population, and the call sign changed to WRLL.

WRLL began broadcasting from this new location in early October 2003. Its slogan was "Real Oldies 1690", featuring pop music artists from the 1950s and early 1960s such as Frank Sinatra and Perry Como, as well as the rock and roll hits of the period. "Real Oldies" originated at sister station WSAI in Cincinnati and was also carried on WCOL in Columbus, Ohio; WHNE in Ann Arbor, Michigan, also aired a variation of the format identified as "Honey Radio". "Dangerous Dan" Allen created the format initially for WSAI, where he was program director and a weekday afternoon DJ.

=== 1690 AM and 1450 AM swap ===
On August 15, 2006, WRLL's on-air talent left the station as a pending format change was announced. On August 15, it was announced that African-American talk-formatted WVON would move its format, talk show hosts and call letters from its longtime spot on the dial at 1450 AM to 1690 AM, effective September 18, 2006. WVON signed an agreement with Clear Channel allowing them to lease the station with an option to buy, and obtain marketing, promotional and production assistance from them as well. The oldies format ended at midnight CDT on September 16, 2006.

On September 18, 2006, the WRLL call sign moved from 1690 AM to 1450 AM, with WVON's call sign and programming doing the reverse, moving from 1450 AM to 1690 AM. (According to standard FCC practice, this technically was not a deletion of WRLL 1690 AM, and instead was merely a call letter change, to WVON, for the continuing operation of "Facility ID# 87178" on 1690 AM).

== Personalities ==
The station featured radio legends Larry Lujack and Tommy Edwards in the morning drive, along with news reporter Kathy Worthington. Other legendary Chicago area radio personalities from WLS and WCFL followed Tommy Edwards and Larry Lujack on the air, including Scotty Brink middays and "World Famous" Tom Murphy in the evening drive. Chicago radio and television personality Jerry G. Bishop, well known as the original "Svengoolie", was the Sunday afternoon DJ on the station. Former WCFL DJ Ron Britain also had a weekday show for a brief time.

Oldies radio veteran and music historian Ron Smith was heard weekday evenings and Saturday mornings, and suburban radio mainstay Len O'Kelly was heard overnight weekdays and Saturday afternoon. Smith's shows included his weekly Foreign Friday feature and Saturday morning/Sunday afternoon Real Oldies Chicago Top 20 Countdown program, which spotlighted the local hits on a certain week in history.
