= Ghetto Freaks =

- Theatrical release poster for "Ghetto Freaks" edition of film
- Directed by: Robert J. Emery
- Screenplay by: John Pappas, Robert J. Emery
- Produced by: George B. Roberts, Paul Rubenstein
- Starring: Paul Elliot, Gabe Lewis, Mickey Shiff
- Cinematography: Paul Rubenstein
- Edited by: Robert J. Emery, Ellen Rubenstein
- Music by: Tomas Baker, Al Zbacnik
- Production company: Cinar Productions
- Distributed by: Cinar Productions/ World International Pictures
- Release date: January 23, 1970
- Running time: 95 minutes
- Country: United States
- Language: English
- Budget: $250,000

Ghetto Freaks is a 1970 American independent hippie exploitation film directed by Robert J. Emery and written by John Pappas and Robert J. Emery. It was filmed entirely in Cleveland, Ohio, and originally opened in Cleveland under the title Sign of Aquarius, alternately titled Love Commune.

Shortly after that, the film was retitled Ghetto Freaks and edited to include two additional minutes of footage showing a young, handsome black man performing a blood ceremony with a group of robed young women. The Ghetto Freaks version was marketed as a blaxploitation film, despite almost all the film's actors, including the male and female leads, being white.

The film has also been distributed under the titles Wages of Sin and The Aquarians (not to be confused with the 1970 television film The Aquarians starring Ricardo Montalbán).

== Plot ==
The film is mainly plotless, following the daily activities of a group of hippies living in a communal apartment in Cleveland, Ohio. The hippies encounter hostile police at a peaceful gathering in a park, get arrested, and spend a night in jail. They earn money by panhandling and selling copies of an underground newspaper on the street. They stage a protest march against the Vietnam War on Cleveland's Public Square, discussing their viewpoints with random passersby. For recreation, they attend a rock concert at a club and frequently use marijuana and LSD. Under the influence of LSD (illustrated by the filmmakers using various psychedelic effects), the hippies engage in nude dancing and uninhibited sex, and one girl experiences a bad trip.

A rudimentary plot concerns the hippies' handsome, womanizing leader, Sonny (Paul Elliot), becoming attached to Donna (Gabe Lewis), a naive young girl who runs away from her parents' home to join the commune after a chance meeting with Sonny at the rock club. Sonny and Donna's newfound happiness is threatened by Billy, a violent drug dealer, who pressures Sonny to push drugs for the local rackets. Sonny refuses, leading to a tragic conclusion in which Donna is killed.

== Cast ==
- Paul Elliot as Sonny
- Gabe Lewis as Donna (aka Diane)
- Mickey Shiff as Halo
- Jim Coursar as Mousey
- Nick Kleinholtz III as Stringbean
- Toni Ceo as Marla
- Tom Baker as Cleaver
- Virginia Morris as Girl on a bad trip
- Bob Wells as Donna's father

== Production ==
In 1969, John Pappas, a rock impresario and nightclub operator from Cleveland, announced that he would be producing "the world's first rock musical on film" entitled The Sign of Aquarius on a budget of approximately $100,000, later increased to $250,000, to be distributed in selected cities by Crown International Pictures. Cinar Productions later committed to distributing the film nationally. Pappas compared his film to the then-current musical Hair, and it was described as being set in a Greenwich Village commune.

Pappas saved money by writing the script himself and hiring most of the actors from the Cleveland area, with one exception being lead actor Paul Elliot, who reportedly had a "sizable list of Broadway credits" and was flown in daily from Cincinnati, where he was appearing in a play at night. Director Robert Emery was from the East Coast and recommended by Cinar. Cult film critic Michael J. Weldon, who later started Psychotronic Video magazine, was a teenager living in the Cleveland area at the time and responded to a casting call for the film but failed the audition.

The film was shot on location in Cleveland, Ohio. Nineteen different locations were used, including the Cleveland Museum of Art, Cleveland Central Police Station, Public Square, the surrounding downtown area, University Circle, and the Detroit-Superior Bridge. Interiors were filmed in the 1614 Building near Playhouse Square. Pappas said that the Cleveland Police "have been especially helpful to us from the first day of shooting."

Bob "Hoolihan" Wells, who in 1970 was well known in Cleveland as a television weather presenter under the name "Hoolihan the Weatherman" and as co-host of the late-night movie and comedy program The Hoolihan and Big Chuck Show, appears briefly in the film as the father of a runaway girl who joins the hippies.

The dance scenes were choreographed by Jeff Kutash, a dancer on the locally produced TV series Upbeat.

== Reception ==
The film premiered in Cleveland in June 1970 under the title Sign of Aquarius, being billed as the "first tribal rock flick" and a "tribal rock folk opera." Following the premiere, Cleveland Plain Dealer film critic Emerson Batdorff wrote that Sign of Aquarius was better than two previous films made in Cleveland, Uptight (1968) and Double-Stop (1968), but was still "amateur in the extreme," with "five or six separate plot lines put together with bubble gum," one of which "resolves itself into a killing which is summarily reversed so everyone can dance in some street garbage for a finale."

Gene Siskel later wrote that the original version of the film, which according to him was called The Aquarians, "did no business," leading to "a title change and hot, but misleading, advertising." The film was retitled Ghetto Freaks, and a drugged orgy scene where Sonny seduces Donna was modified by adding approximately two minutes of footage showing "the black leader of a kinky love cult" and his female followers performing a blood ritual with a knife. The film was retitled Ghetto Freaks, and a new advertising campaign was developed, marketing it as a miscegenation-themed blaxploitation film. Jet and Ebony magazines denounced Ghetto Freaks as being a hastily made attempt to capitalize on the popularity of "black films" such as Cotton Comes to Harlem (1970) and Shaft (1971).

Although the Ghetto Freaks version of the film had engagements during the 1970s in major cities including New York City, Cleveland, Chicago, Atlanta, and Washington, D.C., the film received few reviews, and those it did get were generally negative. Siskel, reviewing the Ghetto Freaks version, called the production "technically inept" and "shot on a frayed shoestring", and observed that despite "being billed as a black film ... the title characters are almost without exception middle-class white kids who have left home and let their hair and paranoia grow." The Cleveland black newspaper Call and Post panned the film as "one degree higher than a home movie" and said, "There is no plot in this crazy mixed-up film which lacks anything else. If you like garbage, you will find Ghetto Freaks to be a groovy flick because it stinks!"

In 1972, while the Ghetto Freaks version was playing the Hippodrome Theater in Cleveland, Allen Johnson II, a Cleveland man described as an amateur actor, sued the Hippodrome for $100,000 for showing a movie which he said was "derogatory of him as a black American and insulting to black Americans in this community". Johnson charged that he appeared in the film without his consent.

In his Psychotronic Video Guide, Michael Weldon later described the film (under the title Love Commune) as an "embarrassing, plotless hippie/drug movie with imitation Hair songs". A Turner Classic Movies review summarized it as "an impressive compendium of hippie clichés and kitsch that are belabored into a fine pulp of unfocused tedium."

Despite its bad reviews, director Quentin Tarantino is reportedly a fan of the film, and Ghetto Freaks was selected as one of 16 films from Tarantino's private collection to be screened at the second Quentin Tarantino Film Festival in 1998. Entertainment Weekly listed Ghetto Freaks as one of the "highlights" of the festival, and the then-managing director of the Austin Film Society said of the film and others selected, "Quentin loves them, and the film geeks love them, but most people..."

== Home media ==
Something Weird Video released the original version of the film on VHS as Love Commune in the 1990s and released the later Ghetto Freaks version in the 2000s as both a digital download and a special edition DVD also featuring the 1966 drug addiction film Way Out.

== Soundtrack ==
Original music and songs for the film were composed by Al Zbacnik and Tom Baker, the music director of the Upbeat show. One song, "I'm Gonna Dodge the Draft," appeared in the initial Sign of Aquarius release but was then cut from the film. The original movie soundtrack album was released in 1970 under the title Sign of Aquarius on the Adell label (ASLP 216) and contains thirteen songs, including "I'm Gonna Dodge the Draft." Although some critics have dismissed the songs as imitative of Hair and "bad faux-rock music", others have praised the music, including Batdorff, who panned the acting, writing and dancing but said the film had "some awfully good music by Al Zbacnik and Thomas Baker", and Patrick Lundborg, who reviewed the soundtrack in his book The Acid Archives.

== See also ==
- List of American films of 1970
