= The Cool Ghoul (Cleveland) =

The Cool Ghoul of northeastern Ohio was played by George Cavender. The show was popular from the 1970s to the 90s, appearing on several stations in the area. The first was WJAN-TV 17 in Canton, Ohio, WOAC-TV 67 and in Cleveland on WOIO-TV 19.

George had been an aficionado of classic Universal Monsters horror films since his father brought home his first copy of Famous Monsters of Filmland magazine in 1960. Cavender studied the careers of Boris Karloff, Lon Chaney, and Vincent Price to name a few. And it was a chance meeting of Vincent Price, while he was on a lecture tour, that led Cavender to revive the show in 1984 on WOAC-TV.

One of his favorite mentors was Ghoulardi, an early 60s Horror Host in Cleveland, Ohio.

George's father was killed in a car accident in 1965 and he credits the horror host Ghoulardi with getting him through the ordeal.

His fascination with movies didn't stop with horror. He also developed a love for theater and, with the encouragement of his mother; he starred in many theatrical productions throughout High School, College, and Community Theater playing roles as diverse as Mathew Harrison Brady in Inherit the Wind, the Cowardly Lion in The Wizard of Oz, and Sherlock Holmes in a play of the same title.

In 1971 at the age of 16, George Cavender got his first chance to play the role of The Cool Ghoul when he made an appointment with the Station Manager of WJAN-TV. He drew posters of the set, had an outline of the show and made his presentation. After he was done there was a long silence. The Station Manager, Don Crump, leaned over the desk and said “When can you start?” Startled at the answer, George said “Give me a week.”

Having so little time, and having lived in Cincinnati for a few years, he was a fan of The Cool Ghoul in that area, played and created by Dick Von Hoene. He called him at WXIX-TV and explained the situation. Amused by George's age, he gave him permission to use his persona. Over the years the persona has undergone a massive transformation. The only resemblance to the Cincinnati version of The Cool Ghoul is the make-up and hair color, but George has always been very appreciative of Dick Von Hoene, giving him the opportunity to get his start.

After WJAN switched to religions programming, Cavender moved to WOAC channel 67. After more than a decade on that station, he left to move to WOIO-TV, channel 19. His place at WOAC was taken by a technician and frequent extra, Keven Scarpino, who took on the persona of the Son of Ghoul.

In a bit of irony, after spending time at WOIO-TV as IT Manager, he was transferred to WXIX-TV in Cincinnati, Von Hoene's station and a sister station of WOIO. There, worked with Dick Von Hoene's brother.

George Cavender's Cool Ghoul worked with many charities including The Jerry Lewis Telethon, Make-A-Wish Foundation, and Bowling for Kids, to name a few.

== Personal ==
Cavender is a native of Canton, Ohio. Home of the Pro Football Hall of Fame. He attended Kent State University and the University of Cincinnati majoring in Theater. Recently he has hosted the show, during the Halloween season, on Warner Cable of Northeastern Ohio and is currently planning a once a month webcast on his site, http://www.ghoul.tv. A.K.A. – http://www.thecoolghoul.com.
