= WCEV =

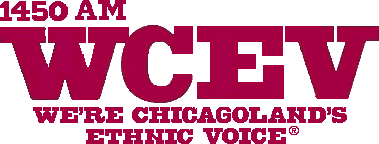
- Cicero, Illinois; United States
- Broadcast area: Chicago market
- Frequency: 1450 kHz
- Branding: WCEV 1450 AM

Ownership
- Owner: Migala Communications Corporation

History
- First air date: October 1, 1979
- Last air date: January 20, 2020
- Call sign meaning: We're Chicagoland's Ethnic Voice

Technical information
- Licensing authority: FCC
- Facility ID: 42137
- Class: C
- Power: 1,000 watts unlimited
- Transmitter coordinates: 41°49′57.1″N 87°42′20.2″W

Links
- Public license information: Public file; LMS

WCEV (1450 AM) was a radio station licensed to Cicero, Illinois, United States. Serving the Chicago metropolitan area, WCEV was owned by Migala Communications Corporation, and aired a time brokered ethnic programming format.

== History ==
After WVON moved from 1450 to 1390 kHz in 1975, both Migala Communications and Midway Broadcasting filed applications to establish a new station on the vacated frequency. Between 1976 and 1979, WFMT was granted an interim license to simulcast on 1450 kHz. In 1979, Migala and Midway reached an agreement to divide the broadcast week between them in a time sharing agreement for two stations.

WCEV was on the air from 1 p.m. to 10 p.m. Monday through Friday; Midway's WXOL broadcast on 1450 during the remaining hours. The two stations shared a transmitter site in South Lawndale, with WCEV's studios in Chicago's Portage Park neighborhood.

On January 9, 2020, Robert Feder reported that WCEV would be going out of business after 40 years on the air. The station signed off for the final time on January 20, 2020, at 10 p.m. WCEV's license was cancelled by the Federal Communications Commission on July 30, 2021.

== Gallery ==
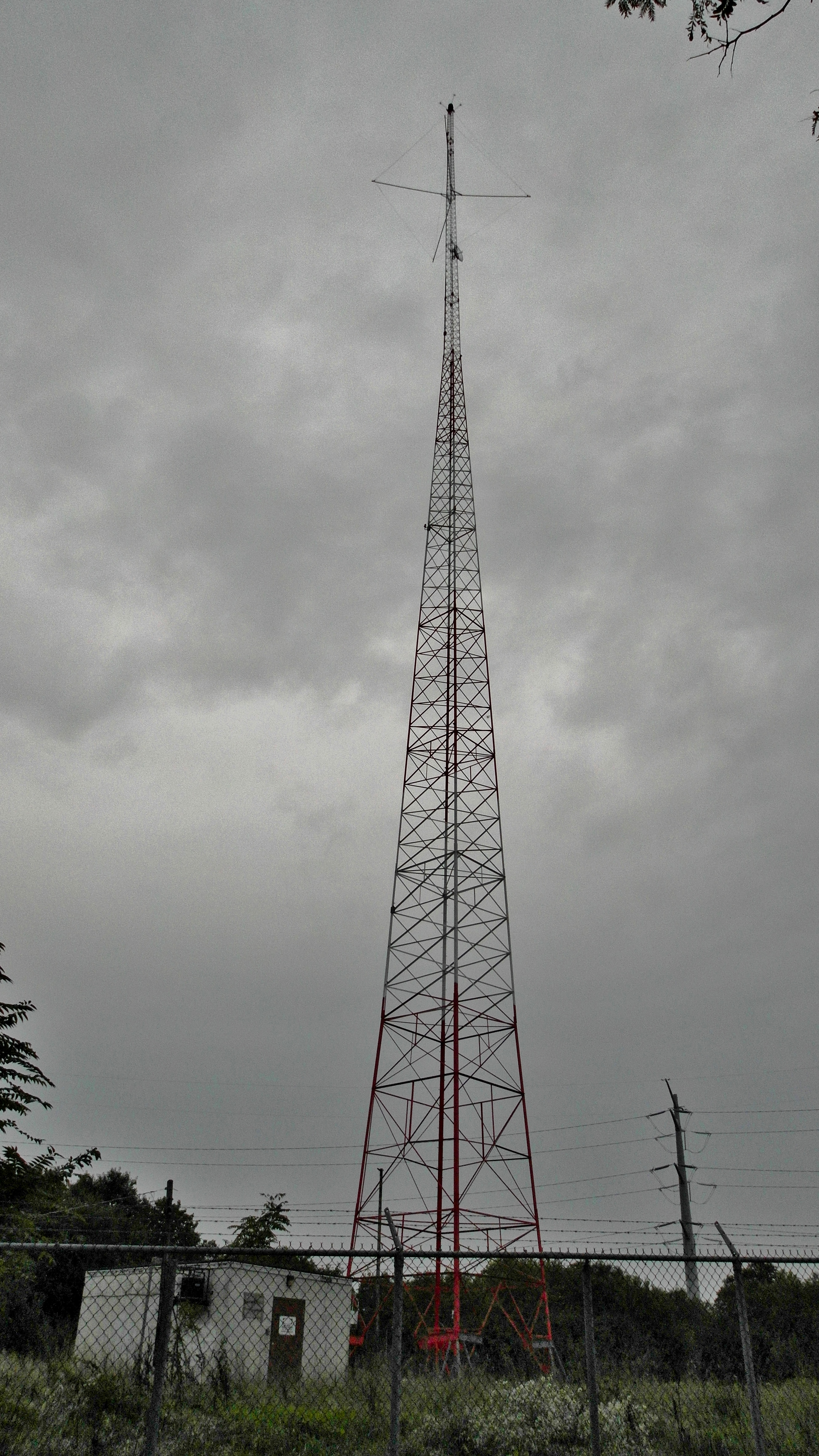
WCEV's tower and transmitter building in South Lawndale

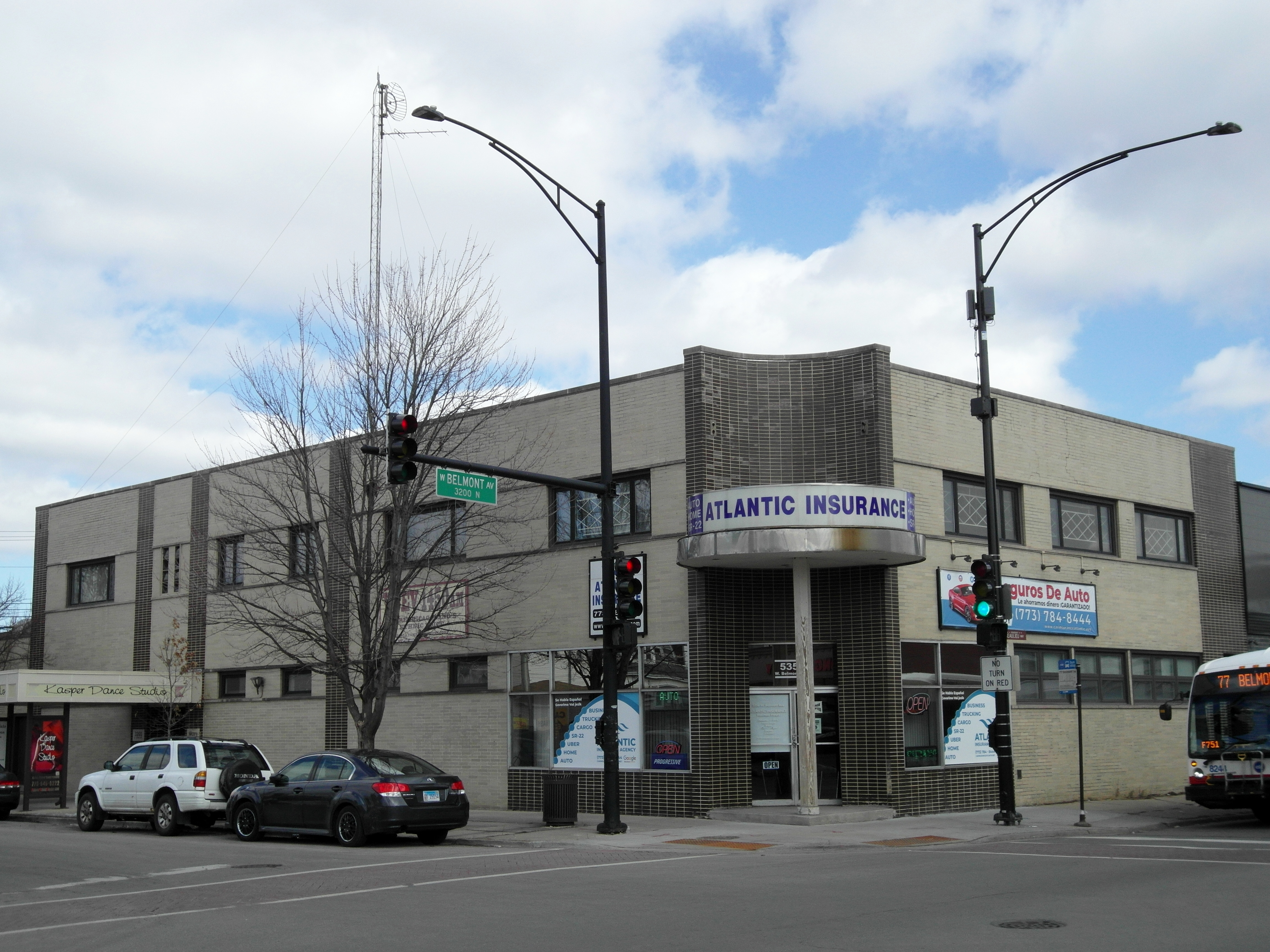
WCEV's studio building in Portage Park

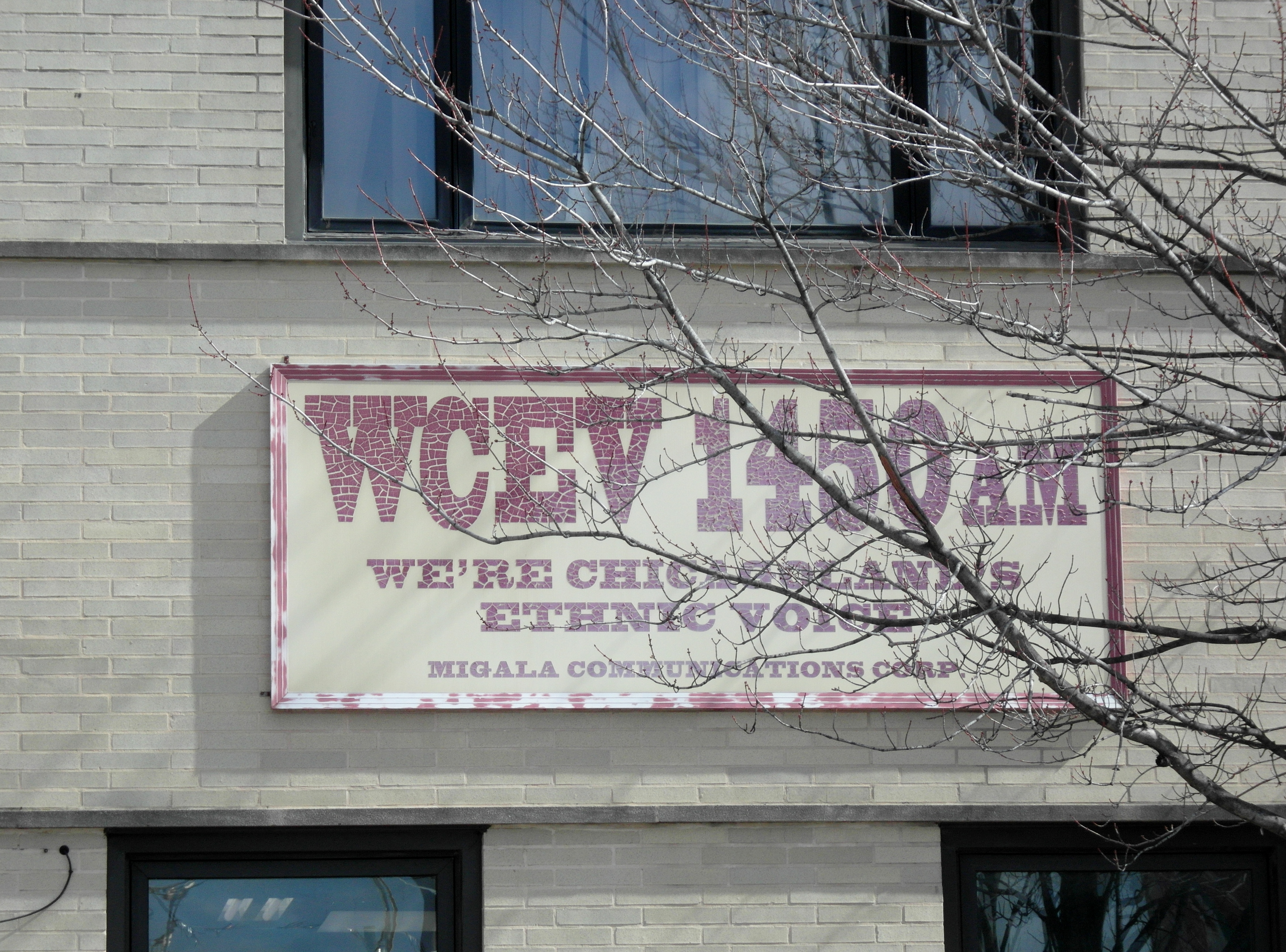
Sign outside of WCEV's studios
