= KRPL =

- Moscow, Idaho; United States
- Broadcast area: Pullman-Moscow area
- Frequency: 1400 kHz
- Branding: 1400 ESPN Palouse

Programming
- Format: Sports
- Affiliations: ESPN Radio

Ownership
- Owner: KRPL, Incorporated

History
- First air date: May 20, 1947
- Call sign meaning: Radio Palouse

Technical information
- Licensing authority: FCC
- Facility ID: 35561
- Class: C
- Power: 1,000 watts
- Transmitter coordinates: 46°44′46″N 117°00′41″W

Links
- Public license information: Public file; LMS
- Website: KRPL Online

KRPL (1400 AM) is a radio station broadcasting a sports format. Located in Moscow, Idaho, United States, the station serves the Moscow–Pullman area on the Palouse. The station became an ESPN affiliate on April 4, 2011, and is currently owned by KRPL, Incorporated.

KRPL has a deep history of being an important Top 40 radio station in the 1960s and 1970s. The station employed great future radio talent such as Larry Lujack, who went on to success in the Chicago market at WLS and WCFL. The station also employed Beau Roberts, (known then as Paul Roberts), who became a major voiceover talent and KZOK Seattle personality. In addition, Brian McKay and Tom Walker in the late 70's moved on to Seattle radio stations.
