= Jerry G. Bishop =

American radio and television personality (1936–2013)

- Born: Jairus Samuel Ghan; August 3, 1936; Chicago, Illinois, U.S.
- Died: September 15, 2013 (aged 77); San Diego, California, U.S.
- Occupations: Radio and television personality
- Years active: 1961–2006
- Spouse: Liz
- Children: 2

Jerry G. Bishop (August 3, 1936 – September 15, 2013) was an American radio and television personality who is known for being Chicago's original "Svengoolie", and for his award-winning twelve-year stint on Sun-Up San Diego.

== Education ==
Born Jairus Samuel Ghan in Chicago to Russian Jewish parents, he graduated from Wright Junior College, the University of Illinois Urbana-Champaign and Columbia College Chicago.

== Career ==
=== Radio ===
In 1961, he got his start in radio at WNMP (now WCGO) in Evanston, hosting the morning-drive program. He also worked part-time on stations in Rockford and Springfield. In 1962, he was hired at WPGC-AM-FM in Washington, D.C., where he stayed for a year, before being hired on at Cleveland giant KYW as a night-time DJ. He had used his real name of Jerry Ghan at his previous jobs, but began using the name "Jerry G" at WPGC. KYW program director Ken Draper requested he use that same name.

During his three-year stint at KYW, Jerry G. toured with the Beatles as a reporter for Group W and NBC Radio stations on their 1964 and 1965 tours, hosted a weekly dance-party program, "Jerry G & Co.," on KYW's television outlet, and recorded a song, "She's Gone," backed by local group the Statesmen. Released as a single on the Clevetown label as by "Jerry G & Co.", it became a local hit in 1966.

When Ken Draper was program director at Chicago's WCFL from 1965 to 1968, he hired Bishop in 1967. Draper then asked him to pick a last name to go with the "Jerry G." name he had been using. He and his wife flipped through the Cleveland phone book, and together settled on the name "Bishop."

=== Television ===
In 1969, Jerry G. became a staff announcer and the host of an afternoon local version of the movie/call-in contest show Dialing For Dollars on WFLD-TV, which was also located in Marina City in what is now The House of Blues building. This affiliation with WFLD would lead to Jerry inventing his most famous role as Svengoolie on Channel 32's Screaming Yellow Theater in 1971.

Bishop was the announcer of the Friday night scary movie anthology Screaming Yellow Theater when he had an idea to create a live host for the program-the character that became known as Svengoolie-at first a Bela Lugosi-type voice under a title card (and over Link Wray's 1958 hit "Rumble"), then on-screen, in the guise of a green-haired, green-bearded, guitar strumming hippie who slept in a psychedelic painted coffin and told corny, vaudeville-era jokes given a horror-movie skew.

The show's title was derived from Screaming Yellow Zonkers, a yellow, sugary glazed popcorn snack, first produced in the 1960s. Svengoolie was a pun on the name Svengali + ghoul. The show, and character, proved to be wildly successful; the show lasted from 1970 until 1973, when parent company Field Communications sold WFLD-TV to Kaiser Broadcasting, which chose to replace Theater with a similar show popular in Cleveland, The Ghoul Show. (The Svengoolie persona would be resurrected, with Bishop's permission, in 1979 by Rich Koz, who had been a writer for the original series; Koz continues in the role today.)

=== Return to radio ===
After leaving WFLD, Bishop was hired by WMAQ as their morning-drive personality. He also worked on the station's television outlet (channel 5), hosting Chicago Camera, a Sunday-afternoon variety program. He also anchored the "Today in Chicago" segment of NBC's Today show. He worked for WMAQ until 1975, when WMAQ changed formats from MOR/talk to country and replaced their entire announcing staff. Bishop remained for a short time afterward, as Director of Corporate Affairs for the National Easter Seals Society of Chicago.

In August 1978, he headed West, to San Diego and KFMB-TV, where he assumed the co-host chair of the long-running morning-talk program Sun-Up San Diego. His co-host, until 1983, was Danuta Rylko. He garnered 3 local Emmy Awards and a National Press Club Award for his work on the show, which he co-hosted for twelve years until its cancellation in 1990. In 1980, he served as local moderator of the discussion segment of Norman Lear's project, "The Baxters". The segment was titled "The Baxters with Bishop". In 1992, he worked at adult-contemporary KPOP (now KLSD), and wound up his broadcasting career with a three-year stint hosting a show (via voice-tracking from San Diego) on WRLL ("Real Oldies 1690"), an Oldies extended-AM station aimed at the Chicago area, beginning in 2003.

=== Restaurateur ===
Away from his radio/television pursuits, Bishop and his family operated two Chicago-themed restaurants in San Diego's Seaport Village for 36 years: the Greek Islands Cafe (based on a similarly-named restaurant in Chicago) and Asaggio Pizza Pasta Plus, a Chicago-style pizzeria. The latter closed in September 2018, having been in business for 31 years.

== Death ==
Bishop died at age 77 on September 15, 2013, at the University of California – San Diego Medical Center, of a heart attack. He was survived by his wife of 49 years, Liz, and his two children.
