= KGEM =

Radio station in Boise, Idaho

- Boise, Idaho; United States
- Frequency: 1140 kHz
- Branding: Salt and Light Catholic Radio

Programming
- Format: Religious talk

Ownership
- Owner: Salt & Light Radio, Inc.

History
- First air date: 1947 (at 1340)
- Former frequencies: 1340 kHz (1947–1951)
- Call sign meaning: a reference to the "Gem State", one of Idaho's state nicknames

Technical information
- Licensing authority: FCC
- Facility ID: 6328
- Class: B
- Power: 10,000 watts day 10,000 watts night
- Transmitter coordinates: 43°35′46.6″N 116°15′3.4″W
- Translator: 102.3 K272FS (Boise)

Links
- Public license information: Public file; LMS
- Webcast: Listen Live
- Website: saltandlightradio.com

KGEM (1140 AM) is a radio station broadcasting a religious talk format. Licensed to Boise, Idaho, United States, the station serves the Boise area. The station is currently owned by Salt & Light Radio, Inc.

Former owners Journal Broadcast Group announced July 22, 2009 that KGEM, along with sister station KCID, were to be sold to Salt & Light Radio for $950,000. The sale closed on September 25, 2009, and as a result the stations were converted to Salt & Light's local Catholic radio format (see Salt + Light Television).

== See also ==
- KGEM-TV, Monrovia, California
