= OHMS (1980 film) =

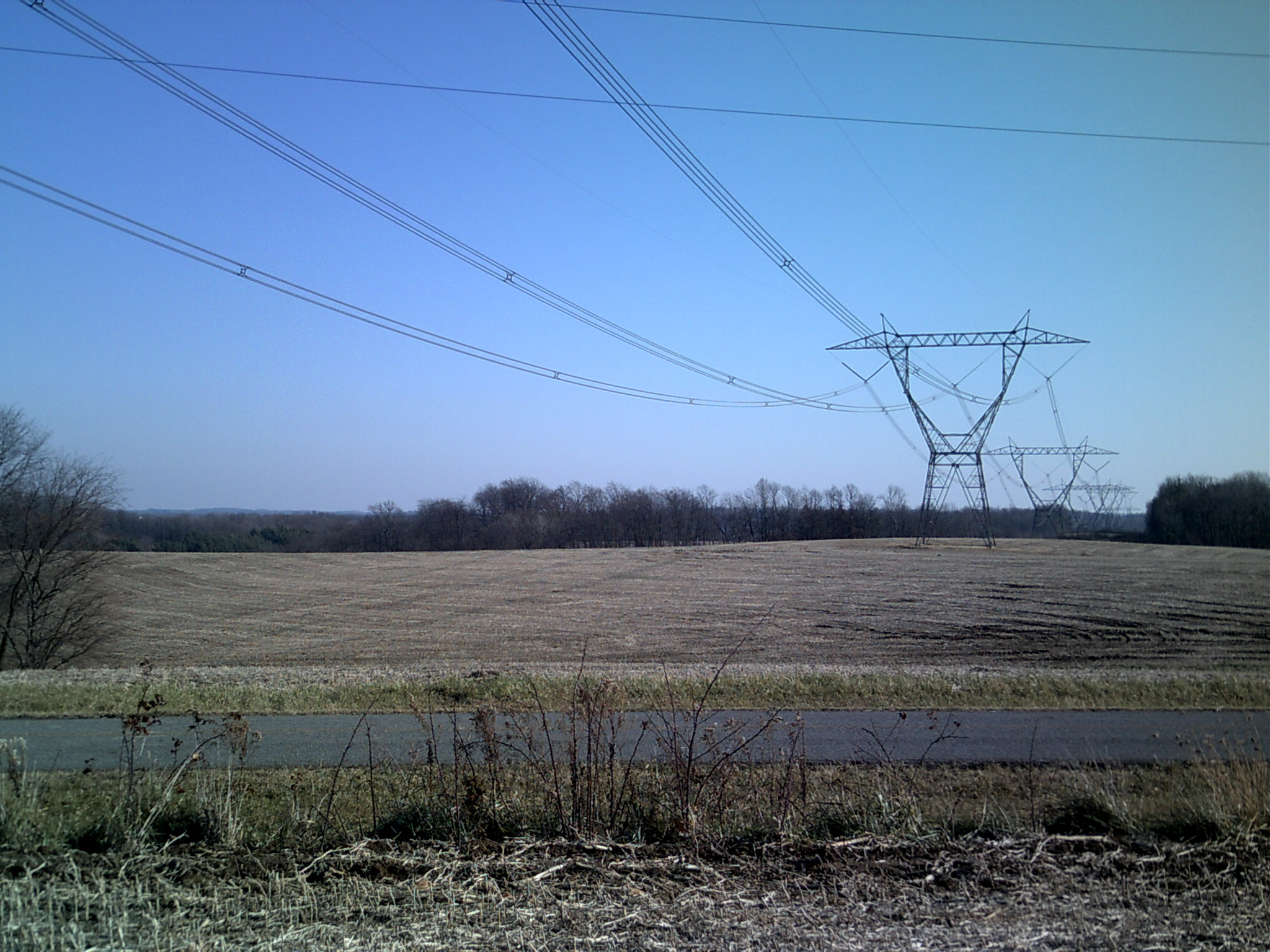
- Some scenes from the film were shot at this location
- Written by: Gene Case
- Directed by: Dick Lowry
- Starring: Ralph Waite; David Birney; Talia Balsam; Dixie Carter; Jimothy Elliot
- Music by: Elizabeth Swados
- Country of origin: United States
- Original language: English

Production
- Executive producer: Merrill Grant
- Producer: Neil T. Maffeo
- Cinematography: James Pergola
- Editor: LaReine Johnston
- Running time: 120 minutes
- Production company: Grant-Case-McGrath Enterprises

Original release
- Network: CBS
- Release: January 2, 1980

OHMS is a 1980 American made-for-television drama film directed by Dick Lowry. It stars Ralph Waite, David Birney, Talia Balsam, Dixie Carter and also features Leslie Nielsen as the Governor. It was broadcast on CBS on January 2, 1980. The film is about a conservative farmer in the Midwest who leads a group of local residents lobbying against a power company invading their land. It was shot on location in New Philadelphia, Ohio.

== Plot summary ==
Faced with a large corporation's attempt to erect large electric towers on private owners' land against their wishes, a conservative farmer organizes community resistance.

== Cast ==
- Ralph Waite as Floyd Wing
- David Birney as Jack Coker
- Talia Balsam as Noranne Wing
- Dixie Carter as Nora Wing
- Charley Lang as Bo Wing
- Cameron Mitchell as Wilbur
- Leslie Nielsen as Governor
- Paul Hecht as Thomas Eichen
- Roy Poole as Joe Szabo
- John Ramsey as Smiley
- Nicholas Hormann as David Nash
- Tom Toner as Judge Donald Itta
- Keith Cosgrove as Dee Wing
- John C. Becher as Henry Lucker
- Bob Wells as TV reporter
- David S. Cass Sr. as Dump Truck Driver
