= Tommy Edwards (announcer) =

American public address announcer

Tommy Edwards is a retired American public address announcer for the Chicago Bulls of the National Basketball Association.

Edwards was the arena voice for the Bulls at Chicago Stadium from 1976 to 1990. During his first tenure with the team, Edwards is credited with originating the Bulls' famous signature style of introducing the starting lineups with "And now..."

Edwards was also one of the first stadium announcers to play Gary Glitter's Rock and Roll (which became one of America's most popular sports anthems).

In 2006, Edwards returned to the Bulls, replacing Steve Scott as the United Center arena voice.

Edwards was also a DJ and program director at several Chicago area radio stations, including WLS, WCFL and WKQX. He was part of the famous "Animal Stories" (as Little "Snot-Nosed" Tommy) with Larry Lujack on WLS and WRLL. Edwards programmed WODS in Boston from 1990 to 1992, then moved to KCBS-FM in Los Angeles, where he created the "Arrow" (All Rock & Roll Oldies) format. He most recently worked at 104.3 K-Hits, an oldies station broadcasting out of Chicago. Edwards retired from radio on September 12, 2014, after a 54-year career.

Edwards was born in Topeka, Kansas and lives in Lake Forest, Illinois. He began in radio at KTOP in Topeka and worked at WEAM in Washington DC and WOR-FM in New York City before moving to Chicago.

Edwards announced that the Chicago Bulls game against the Houston Rockets on November 9, 2019, would be his last as a PA announcer. He retired and moved to the West Coast to be closer to his children.
