= WRLL =

Coordinates: 41°49′57.12″N 87°42′20.2″W

- Cicero, Illinois; United States
- Broadcast area: Chicago market
- Frequency: 1450 kHz
- Branding: WRLL 1450AM

Programming
- Format: Spanish variety

Ownership
- Owner: Midway Broadcasting Corporation

History
- First air date: 1979
- Former call signs: WXOL (1979–1984); WVON (1984–2006)
- Call sign meaning: "Real Oldies" (on-air branding for original WRLL at 1690 AM)

Technical information
- Licensing authority: FCC
- Facility ID: 42068
- Class: C (local)
- Power: 1,000 watts unlimited
- Translator: 98.3 W252AW (Chicago)

Links
- Public license information: Public file; LMS
- Webcast: Listen live
- Website: www.wrll1450.com

WRLL (1450 AM) is a Spanish variety radio station licensed to Cicero, Illinois, and serving the Chicago market. The station is owned by Midway Broadcasting.

== History ==
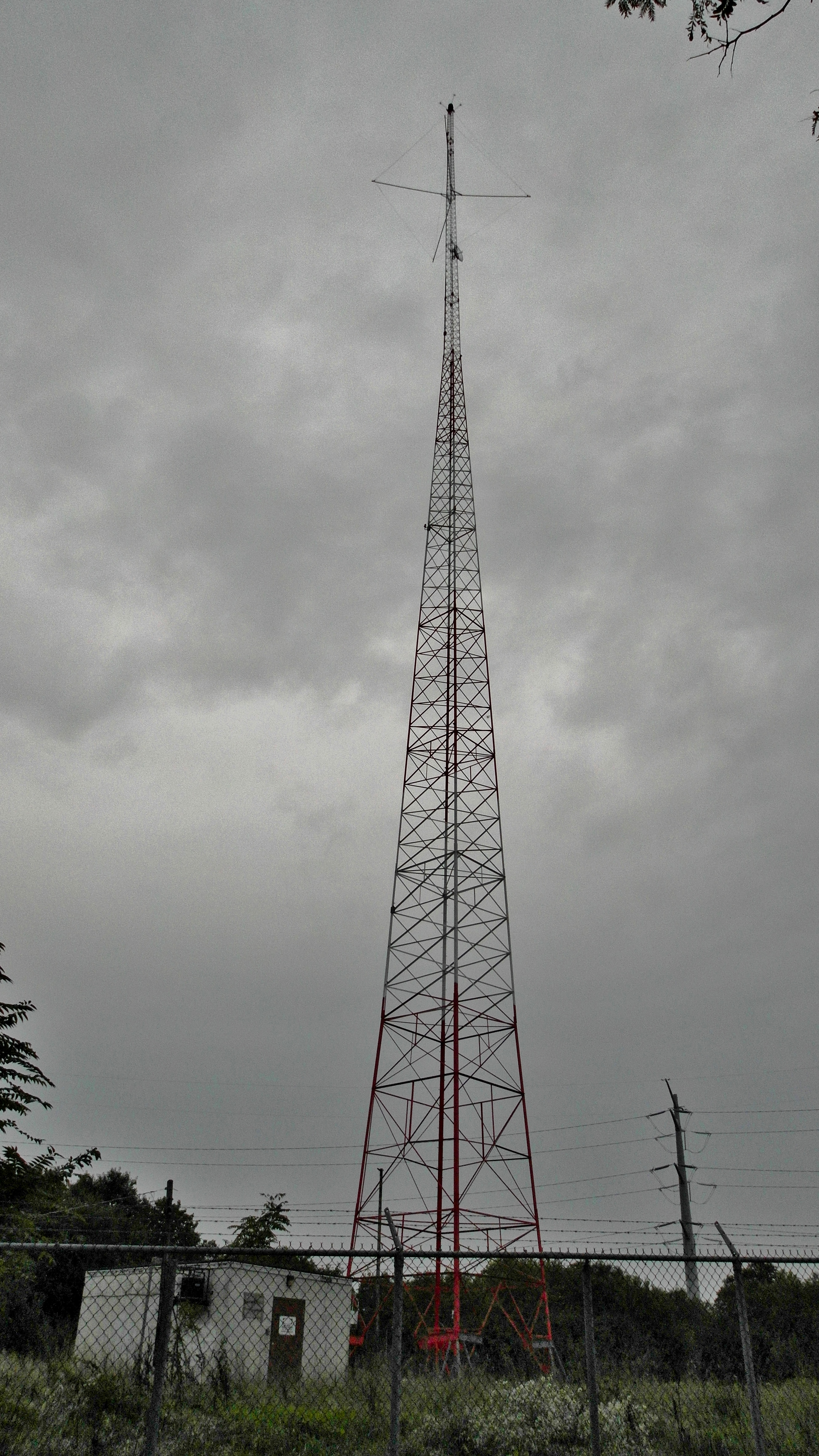
WRLL's tower and transmitter building in South Lawndale.

In 2006, WVON, which had long operated on 1450 kHz, moved to 1690 kHz. The callsign WRLL, which had been held by the original station on 1690, "Real Oldies 1690", was shifted to 1450. Initially simulcasting WVON, on September 3, 2007, the station adopted a Spanish-language format called "Radio Latino".

Until 2021, WRLL shared the 1450 kHz frequency with brokered ethnic station WCEV. After WCEV shut down and had its license cancelled, WRLL gained full control over the frequency, allowing it to become a 24-hour station on October 18, 2021.

On April 5, 2022, WRLL's translator, W252AW, was fined $9,000, following an informal objection filed by Albert David, as the translator had been operating and originating programming while its parent station, WRLL, was off the air.
