= Rich Koz =

American actor and broadcaster (born 1952)

- Born: Richard Koz; March 12, 1952 (age 74); Park Ridge, Illinois, U.S.
- Occupations: Actor, broadcaster
- Years active: 1972–present

Rich Koz (born March 12, 1952) is an American actor and broadcaster best known for his portrayal of horror-movie host Svengoolie, as well as his early '90s children's cartoon showcase The Koz Zone. Koz is also the host of the syndicated Stooge-a-Palooza program. In 2021, he was inducted into the Rondo Hatton Classic Horror Awards' Monster Kid Hall of Fame.

== Beginnings ==
Koz got his start in broadcasting at WMTH-FM, the high school radio station at Maine East in Park Ridge, Illinois. While Koz was at Northwestern University, he sent the original Svengoolie, Jerry G. Bishop, material for the horror-movie program. Bishop subsequently invited Koz to join the show's staff.

When the show was cancelled in 1973, Bishop and Koz worked together doing mornings on WMAQ radio in Chicago, and Koz worked with radio legend Dick Orkin on commercials and syndicated features, including "ChickenMan Returns for the Last Time Again." When Bishop left for San Diego in 1978, he gave Koz permission to create a show known as Son of Svengoolie, now simply known as Svengoolie.

== Son of Svengoolie ==
In June 1979, on WFLD-TV Ch. 32, Koz began as Son of Svengoolie, winning numerous local Emmy awards, and having his show syndicated to sister stations in Philadelphia, Detroit, Boston, and San Francisco for a brief period. In 1986, after the station was acquired by the News Corporation, WFLD canceled Svengoolie, believing the show not dignified for a network affiliate. He did some freelance radio, including stints as a fill-in at WGN radio.

== The Koz Zone ==
From 1989 to 1993, Koz returned to WFLD (now "Fox 32") to host a new hosted movie show where he appeared to be "breaking in" to the Fox signal (a take-off of an actual event where WGN and WTTW had their signals pirated). The show was originally untitled, but viewers were asked to address letters to "Lose Weight by Selling Real Estate, No Money Down" until the show adopted the name The Koz Zone.

The show featured cartoons presented by Koz, interspersed by sketch comedy bits. This show won him his next local Emmy, and later became the daily Koz Zone for Kids. Koz also did mornings on WCKG radio for a brief period, co-hosted live 4 July and New Year's Eve programming, and became weekend and fill-in weather anchor for Fox 32 News.

== 1995–present ==
In 1995, Koz came back on the air as part of the launch team for newly independent station WCIU-TV, Channel 26. He became Svengoolie (after Jerry G. Bishop—the original Svengoolie from 1970 to 1973—told him he could drop the "Son of" because he was "all grown up now") and resumed weekly horror movie shows, along with numerous other duties. Koz, having won numerous regional Emmy Awards, was admitted to the NATAS/Emmy "Silver Circle" for "outstanding contributions to Chicago television". Starting in 2011, he began to be seen nationwide when his Svengoolie show became a regular Saturday night staple on the MeTV classic TV network.

In his Son of Svengoolie persona, Rich Koz is also known for the early 1980s 3-D broadcast of Revenge of the Creature (the sequel to Creature from the Black Lagoon) that resulted in a civil action lawsuit by people who felt they didn't get enough 3-D for the 89 cents they spent for the cardboard glasses.

In November 2012, Koz suffered a heart attack at his home. He had previously suffered a heart attack at his home a decade earlier, in March 2002.
