= Svengoolie =

American television show

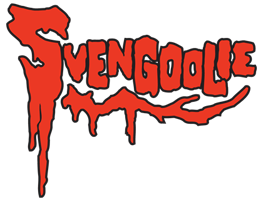
- Also known as: Screaming Yellow Theater; Son of Svengoolie
- Genre: Horror; Science-fiction; Comedy; Comedy horror
- Created by: Jerry G. Bishop
- Developed by: Jerry G. Bishop (1970–73); Rich Koz (1979–present)
- Written by: Jerry G. Bishop (1970–73); Rich Koz (1979–present)
- Directed by: Chris M. Faulkner
- Presented by: Jerry G. Bishop (1970–73); Rich Koz (1979–present)
- Composer: Doug Scharf
- Country of origin: United States

Production
- Executive producers: Rich Koz; Jim Roche
- Producer: Chris M. Faulkner
- Production locations: Chicago, Illinois, US
- Cinematography: Malcom Conyers
- Editor: Chris M. Faulkner
- Camera setup: Malcom Conyers
- Running time: 120 minutes (1970–2022); 150 minutes (2023–present)
- Production company: U-City Productions

Original release
- Network: WFLD (1970–73; 1979–86); WCIU (1994–present); MeTV (2011–present)
- Release: September 18, 1970 – present

Related
- Sventoonie (2022)

Svengoolie is an American hosted horror movie television program. The show features horror and science fiction films and is hosted by the character Svengoolie, who was originally played by Jerry G. Bishop from 1970 to 1973, before Rich Koz succeeded him in the role in 1979. Before and after commercial breaks, Svengoolie presents sketches, tells jokes, and performs parody songs related to the films being aired. The show is a long-running local program in the Chicago area and in 2011 expanded nationally, airing Saturday nights on MeTV.

== Format ==
The show airs both low-budget and classic horror and science-fiction movies, with host "Svengoolie" – a portmanteau of the words Svengali and ghoul – played by Rich Koz (pronounced "Koze"), who wears thick skull-like makeup around his eyes and cheekbones, a moustache, goatee, and long wig, all black, and a black top hat with a tuxedo jacket over a bright-red, open-collared, pleated tuxedo shirt.

Just before and after commercial breaks, Svengoolie presents sketches, tells corny jokes, and performs song parody spoofs of the film being aired. Some shows were presented in what was later dubbed "Sven-surround" – a pun on "Sensurround", a brand name theater audio system – in which Svengoolie would joke as the film aired sometimes with humorous sound effects. This stunt was discontinued for a short time, then brought back due to viewer request, although as a clip segment aired outside the film.

One relatively recent addition to the show is the simultaneous use of Twitter with the hashtag #svengoolie, allowing those watching to comment on the show.

=== Films ===
In August 2006, it was reported that WCIU had obtained broadcast rights to the classic Universal Monsters films of the 1930s and 1940s. These films had been requested since Svengoolie aired in the 1980s. By December 2006, the show featured four episodes of the Abbott and Costello "Meet" series, with Universal Studios Monsters and several Hammer Film Productions that were distributed by Universal-International. On May 5, 2007, Svengoolie presented Bela Lugosi's Dracula (1931), claiming that it was the first time the movie had been shown on local television in more than a decade.

=== Themes ===
The show opens with a reference to early radio broadcasting: "Calling all stations, clear the air lanes, clear all air lanes for the big broadcast." This is a sound clip from the preview "trailer" of one of the four "Big Broadcast Of .... (1932, 1936, 1937, 1938)" movies. In a running gag throughout the series, Svengoolie's mentions of the Chicago suburb of Berwyn are met with an audio clip of several people groaning "BERWYN?!?" Another recurring gag involves rubber chickens thrown at Svengoolie after a weak joke, usually at the end of an episode's opening and closing sketches. Visitors assist the crew in throwing rubber chickens during taping. Frequently sound clips are used from Warner Bros. cartoons ("Oh we're the boys of the Chorus,"...etc.), radio broadcasts of The Stan Freberg Show ("Thank you for all those cards and letters, you folks in television LANT.....", "Wun'erful, Wun'erful" and "Ow, OW, OW!!!" from "The HoneyEarthers"), and other sources.

== Characters ==
- Svengoolie – the title character and host of the show, who introduces the film, tells jokes and relates trivia about the movie. The character was originally portrayed by former WCFL personality Jerry G. Bishop, who held the role from 1970 to 1973. When the show returned in 1979, Rich Koz took on the role of "Son of Svengoolie", which he portrayed until the show's cancellation in 1986. When Koz was preparing to revive the show at the end of 1994, Bishop told him he was "all grown up" and could drop the "Son of" portion from his character name. Koz has been playing "Svengoolie" ever since.
- Doug Graves – Svengoolie's accompanist during the show's weekly music number centered around the episode's film. Doug is shown frequently at the piano or organ, though he is equally adept at playing the trumpet. Graves is played by professional musician and Svengoolie crew member Doug Scharf.
- Zallman T. Tombstone (voiced by Rich Koz) – A smart-mouthed, disembodied skull that often acts as a foil for Svengoolie during comedy skits, with a voice based on Bill Saluga's Ray J. Johnson Jr. character.
- Kerwyn (voiced by Rich Koz) - A smart-aleck rubber chicken puppet who helps Svengoolie review viewer mail and photos.
- Zelda (voiced by Jerry G. Bishop) - A smart-mouthed, disembodied skull (much like her successor, Tombstone) with a voice modeled after Flip Wilson's Geraldine Jones character.
- Anita X. Orcist – A saxophone player who appears infrequently during the show's weekly music number; portrayed by Natalie Scharf, Doug's daughter.
- Durwood the Dummy (voiced by Jerry G. Bishop in 1970–73, Rich Koz in 1979–present) – A wooden ventriloquist's dummy featured on the original series (1970–73), later carried over to the Son of Svengoolie series and retained from then on, though featured infrequently in recent years.
- Boddy Sorrell (voiced by Rich Koz) – The face on Svengoolie's coffin lid. His name is a pun on The Dick Van Dyke Show character Buddy Sorrell, played on that show by Morey Amsterdam. His voice is modeled after Amsterdam's.
- Gwengoolie (played by Sarah M. Palmer, aka Pinup Palmer) – A character added to the cast after the "Spawn of Svengoolie" talent search and member of the "Sven Squad". Making her first on-air appearance towards the end of the September 23, 2023, episode of "The Return of the Vampire". Her outfits and hair frequently change between episodes and she often leads the Sven Squad.
- Ignatius Malvolio Prankenstein (IMP) – An imp-like character added to the cast after the "Spawn of Svengoolie" talent search and member of the "Sven Squad". Played by Scott Gryder, formerly of Green Screen Adventures, he made his first on-air appearance towards the end of the September 30, 2023 episode of "Trilogy of Terror". He frequently refers to Sven as his "uncle", despite Sven constantly denying that they are related.
- Nostalgiaferatoo (played by Bill Leff, host of MeTV's morning cartoon show Toon In with Me) – A character based on the vampire Nosferatu, with a comical twist, which began making appearances on Svengoolie on April 8, 2023, during the "Spawn of Svengoolie" talent search and is now recognized as one part of the "Sven Squad". His first television appearance was on Toon In with Me, on October 13, 2022, on the episode titled "NOStolgiaFERATOO", as an "ultra-creepy nostalgia consultant". He often carries around a prop candelabra and frequently shouts "Silence!" even if no one's talking.

Many other incidental characters throughout the show's run have been voiced by Rich Koz and – during his tenure – Jerry G. Bishop, as well as WFLD staff announcer Jim Barton (during the "Son of" years).

== Production ==
Rich Koz did most of the artwork for the show when he revived it as Son of Svengoolie at WFLD. For every episode, Koz researches the film to find interesting facts, then writes each episode, spending about four hours doing so.

The camera shots and audio effects are handled by director Chris Faulkner and Kevin Reisberg, the show's assistant director.

In 2014, the original casket prop used by both Bishop and Koz on camera was retired and donated to the Museum of Broadcast Communications in Chicago. Segments showcasing the original casket continued to be rebroadcast on the MeTV schedule. Rebroadcasts often will use improved prints of the films if they have become available, while keeping the old comedy skits.

== Broadcast history ==
Jerry G. Bishop as the original Svengoolie

The show's original title was Screaming Yellow Theater. The title was derived from Screaming Yellow Zonkers, a yellow, sugary glazed popcorn snack, first produced in the 1960s.

The show debuted on September 18, 1970, on WFLD (channel 32) and ran on the station until September 7, 1973. Svengoolie was played then by Jerry G. Bishop. In later seasons, Rich Koz – a fan who sent in sketch ideas – became a show writer. In 1973, Kaiser Broadcasting took over WFLD from Field Communications and Screaming Yellow Theater was cancelled and replaced with The Ghoul from Cleveland. The Ghoul lasted until 1974 when it was taken off the air. Field Communications re-purchased WFLD back from Kaiser Broadcasting in 1978, which led Jerry Bishop and Rich Koz to discuss the show's resurrection.

On June 16, 1979, Son of Svengoolie debuted on WFLD, with Koz in the title role. The show also aired on Field Communications-controlled stations in Philadelphia, Boston, San Francisco, and Detroit. The series ran until WFLD, then owned by Metromedia, was sold to Rupert Murdoch's Fox Television Stations Group in 1986 as part of the newly created Fox network. New management canceled the show, deciding that it did not fit the new programming direction. After 334 shows, the final episode aired January 25, 1986. Koz remained at WFLD in various capacities, mainly as the host of Fox Kids Club and The Koz Zone weekday afternoon children's programming, and appearing as an announcer on WFLD's 1988 New Year's Eve broadcast.

Neal Sabin, executive vice president of locally based Weigel Broadcasting, brought the show back on December 31, 1994, on independent station WCIU (channel 26, later a CW affiliate), which had switched from a multicultural programming format (mixing English- and various foreign-language programs) to a conventional general entertainment schedule on that date after losing its part-time rights to Univision programming to newly owned-and-operated WGBO, using "Svengoolie" as the name; Koz took the role of Svengoolie when Bishop told Koz that he "believed he was grown up enough now to no longer be just the Son." Koz also hosted a weekly Three Stooges Stooge-a-palooza show on WCIU.

The series was aired on Chicago's WWME-CA, Milwaukee stations WBME-CD and WMLW-TV, and occasionally on WMYS-LD in South Bend, Indiana. These stations are owned by Weigel Broadcasting. Beginning on April 2, 2011, Svengoolie's show became available nationally on the MeTV network through the efforts of Neal Sabin.

Starting January 7, 2023, Svengoolie expanded from two hours to two and a half hours, filling out a full three hour block with Sventoonie.

== Spin-offs ==
A spin-off of both Svengoolie and MeTV's morning cartoon block Toon In with Me, titled Sventoonie, premiered on MeTV on March 26, 2022. Sventoonie was hosted by Toon In with Me's Kevin Fleming as his puppet character Toony the Tuna, in character as "Sventoonie". In the series, Sventoonie reviewed classic horror films and took part in comedy sketches with his own cast, including occasional appearances by Svengoolie himself. Sventoonie ended on February 25, 2023, with reruns of the classic Batman replacing it the following Saturday night.

Another spin-off of Svengoolie titled House of Svengoolie starred the Sven Squad as they also show horror and sci-fi movies.

== Expansion ==
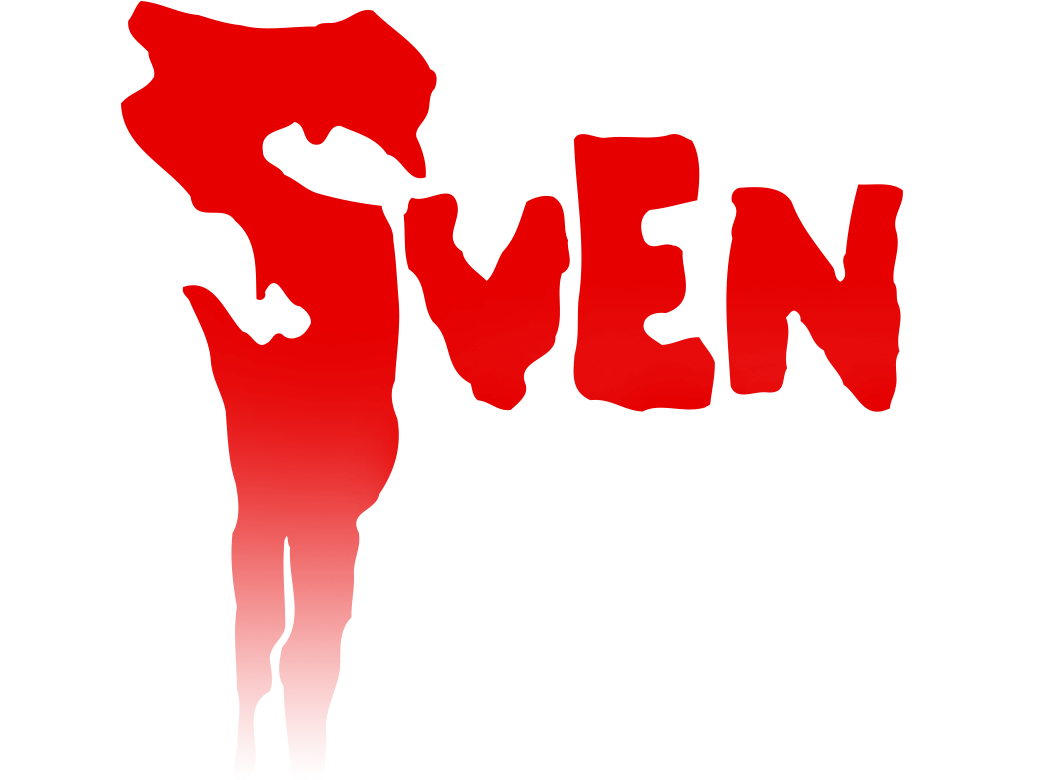
The Sven Squad logo

On October 1, 2022, it was announced that a nationwide talent search, called "Spawn of Svengoolie", would be accepting auditions for fans to create a character and send in their audition video, in hopes of joining the production. There was also an opportunity for fans to audition at the 2022 New York Comic Con.

One year later, three new characters, "The Sven Squad", began to appear in short spots and segments during the broadcast. (Gwengoolie, Ignatius Malvolio Prankenstein & Nostalgiaferatoo), although Nostalgiaferatoo began appearing much earlier than Gwen and Imp. Sven Squad merchandise and promotional photos were added to the official MeTV website's Svengoolie page, beginning around October 22, 2023.

== Reception ==
Between 1979 and 1986, Son of Svengoolie won three Chicago Emmys at station WFLD. For its 25th anniversary in 2004, Svengoolie was presented with the Silver Circle Award by the Chicago/Midwest Chapter of the Academy of Television Arts & Sciences for "outstanding contributions to Chicago television."

Svengoolie is also a consistent winner of the "Best Horror Host" award from the Rondo Hatton Classic Horror Awards.

Svengoolie appeared as a supporting character in a storyline in the Dick Tracy comic strip that started in April 2017.

A special four-part crossover story in two-page parts featuring Svengoolie with the various DC Comics superheroes ran through the month of October 2019. DC Comics editor Dan Didio said the idea for this was a "fun mash-up" featuring the Justice League alongside elements of the Svengoolie show.
