= WDDD (AM) =

Radio station in Johnston City, Illinois, United States (1979–2012)

Johnston City, Illinois; United States
- Frequency: 810 kHz

History
- First air date: 1979
- Last air date: 2012
- Former call signs: WDDW (1978–1983)
- Call sign meaning: Dennis "Dutch" Doelitzsch, owner of 3-D Communications Corp.

Technical information
- Facility ID: 122
- Class: B

WDDD (810 AM) was a commercial radio station licensed to Johnston City, Illinois.

== History ==
WDDD debuted in 1979 as WDDW, with an easy listening musical format. In 1983, the call letters were changed to WDDD.

=== Expanded Band assignment ===
On March 17, 1997, the Federal Communications Commission (FCC) announced that eighty-eight stations had been given permission to move to newly available "Expanded Band" transmitting frequencies, ranging from 1610 to 1700 kHz, with WDDD authorized to move from 810 to 1690 kHz.

A construction permit for the expanded band station was assigned the call letters WHTE on June 5, 1998. The FCC's initial policy was that both the original station and its expanded band counterpart could operate simultaneously for up to five years, after which owners would have to turn in one of the two licenses, depending on whether they preferred the new assignment or elected to remain on the original frequency, although this deadline was extended multiple times.

In most cases the expanded band station remained in the same market as the original standard band station. However, in 2003, the 1690 AM authorization, with the new call sign WRLL, was moved north 280 miles (450 km) by owner Clear Channel to Berwyn, Illinois, in order to take advantage of the Chicago region's greater population.

The FCC had a general policy that both an original standard band station and its expanded band counterpart had to remain under common ownership. In 2008 Clear Channel requested a waiver in order to sell WDDD, but not the paired expanded band authorization, to Withers Broadcasting of Southern Illinois, LLC. However, this request was denied, and on July 31, 2012, WDDD was deleted.
