= Dorothy Fuldheim =

American journalist and anchor (1893–1989)

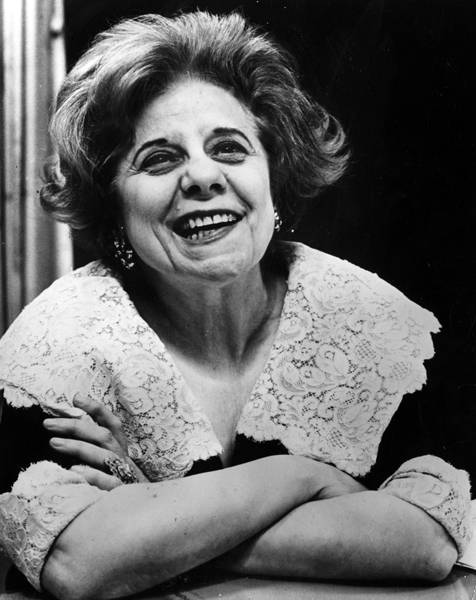
- Fuldheim in 1977
- Born: Dorothy Violet Snell; June 26, 1893; Passaic, New Jersey
- Died: November 3, 1989 (aged 96); Cleveland, Ohio
- Occupations: journalist, newscaster, news commentator and interviewer
- Employer: WEWS-TV (1947–1984)
- Known for: first prominent American female journalist, radio/television newscaster and commentator

Dorothy Fuldheim (June 26, 1893 – November 3, 1989) was an American journalist and news anchor who spent the majority of her career at The Cleveland Press and WEWS-TV, both based in Cleveland, Ohio.

Fuldheim had a role in United States television news history. She is credited with being the first woman in the United States to anchor a television news broadcast as well to host her own television show, a role she held at WEWS for 37 years. She has been referred to as the "First Lady of Television News."

== Early life and early career ==
Fuldheim, an American of Jewish descent, was born in Passaic, New Jersey. She spent her childhood in Milwaukee, Wisconsin. Prior to working in broadcasting, she was an elementary school teacher. Social activist Jane Addams recruited her in 1918 to speak about social causes, which started her career as a public speaker. For the next 19 years, Fuldheim frequently spoke about topics relating to foreign policy and social causes.

Fuldheim entered broadcasting with the debut of a weekly program over Cleveland radio station WTAM on December 12, 1929, and added a daily program over the NBC Red Network on August 28, 1933, that WTAM originated. Her speeches which advocated hot-button issues like birth control and her opposition to publicly owned utilities and railroads earned her the nicknames of "militant Cleveland lecturer" and "the American H. G. Wells", quickly becoming a fixture on the circuit with 3,500 speeches given during a 20-year span. Fuldheim traveled internationally and visited interwar Europe on an annual basis, notably interviewing Engelbert Dollfuss two days before his assassination, and Adolf Hitler in 1932 shortly before his rise to power. Interviews like these, which were conducted to help provide source material for her lectures, also informed her approach to broadcasting as the first female news analyst in network radio while with NBC Red.

WJW radio, also based in Cleveland, began airing daily news commentaries by Fuldheim starting in June 1944 as part of their Newspaper of the Air program. Fuldheim was hired by WJW based on her reputation as a public speaker, a career that continued unabated. WJW assigned her to attend the San Francisco Conference that established the United Nations to interview attendees and monitor any developments. In a subsequent lecture, she warned about rising tensions between the U. S. and the Soviet Union, saying "unless the United States finds a way to work with Russia harmoniously, we are doomed." During this period, Dorothy spoke about and advocated for the peace movement and peacekeeping both prior to and after the end of World War II along with maintaining social welfare programs domestically.

Fuldheim additionally engaged in literary criticism and book reviews, with one review for the Kathleen Winsor novel Forever Amber drawing a capacity crowd of 600 women; Fuldheim expressed shock at the number of people wanting to hear her discuss a "badly-written book" revolving around sex appeal while expressing chagrin over her other lectures not netting such large audiences. In addition to her daily program, Fuldheim hosted Young America Thinks over WJW, a weekly public affairs open forum program aimed at high school students in collaboration with the Cleveland Board of Education.

== Television career ==
Scripps Howard hired Fuldheim away from WJW, ostensibly for WEWS-FM (102.1), but she promptly became a part of WEWS-TV upon their December 17, 1947, sign-on via a 13-week contract. Fuldheim later mused on joining WEWS, "I'm sure (Scripps) didn't intend to use me... because television was supposed to be for the young and the beautiful and God knows what". Despite leaving WJW proper, she informally remained with the station after the Brotherhood of Railroad Trainmen purchased airtime over ABC for a weekly 15-minute commentary program. At the time of its launch, WEWS was one of two television stations in operation between New York City and Chicago. (The other one was in Detroit.)

In 1959, Fuldheim, who had been with the station before it even went on air, began to formulate her own newscast in response to the new Eyewitness News on KYW, which was the first half-hour newscast in the country. Fuldheim centered her newscast around her interviews, a general overview of the news, and her commentaries (during which the very opinionated Fuldheim frequently inserted her own opinions about the stories). Fuldheim was the first woman in the United States to have her own television news analysis program.

While the format of her show, Highlights of the News, consisted primarily of news analysis, it also included commentary, book reviews and interviews. In the years that Highlights of the News aired, Fuldheim interviewed among others Martin Luther King Jr., Helen Keller, the Duke of Windsor, and Barbara Walters. She also interviewed several American presidents.

In the 1960s, Fuldheim teamed with Cleveland radio personality Bill Gordon to host "The One O'Clock Club" on WEWS, a mix of entertainment, news, and interviews. This show eventually inspired KYW to launch a similar show hosted by Mike Douglas that eventually eclipsed "The One O' Clock Club" in popularity en route to becoming nationally syndicated. At this same time, Fuldheim was also frequently lampooned and skewered on WJW-TV's Shock Theater with Ghoulardi.

Fuldheim, recognizable for her fiery red hair, was known for her sometimes controversial opinions. She was not shy about supporting unpopular causes, nor in voicing her opposition if she disagreed with a guest. On one program, she interviewed 1960s activist Jerry Rubin about his book Do It. In the interview, Rubin started to quiz Fuldheim, asking her if she drank. Fuldheim said, "I have the damn best liver in Cleveland." He then took a picture of a nude woman and showed it to her. Fuldheim responded by asking Rubin, "How is [the photo] germane to the topic?" He then referred to the police as "pigs" and offended Fuldheim, who replied, "I've got a shock for you. I'm very friendly with policemen.". Rubin then said "Well, I've got a shock for you. I'm very friendly with the Black Panther Party." At which, Fuldheim threw his book and kicked Rubin off the set saying "Out! Stop the interview" as the cameras rolled.

At times, Fuldheim could offend some members of her audience. A month after ejecting Rubin from her television show, she found herself in the controversial hotseat. On May 4, 1970, while live on the air, Fuldheim made the following statement regarding the actions of the Ohio National Guard during the Kent State shootings, "What is wrong with our country? We're killing our own children." Due to her reference to the shooting of the four students as murder, there were numerous calls from viewers for Fuldheim to resign from her position at WEWS. However, she had the backing of station management and did not resign. Also controversial was her insistence, sharing the stage on The Tonight Show Starring Johnny Carson with comedian Richard Pryor in 1978, that in America there were no people who lived on the streets or children who starved.

In 1980, Fuldheim was inducted in the Ohio Women's Hall of Fame and covered major 1980s events: She traveled to London to cover the 1981 royal wedding of Prince Charles and Lady Diana Spencer, the funeral of assassinated Egyptian president Anwar Sadat and to Northern Ireland to interview the family of IRA hunger striker Bobby Sands.

== Death and posthumous recognition ==
Fuldheim's long and distinguished career, where, at age 91, she still conducted interviews and read commentaries on-air three times every day, ended when she suffered a stroke on July 27, 1984, shortly after interviewing U.S. President Ronald Reagan via satellite. The station received so many phone calls from viewers asking about her condition that an automated answering machine service was set up, devoted to providing updates about her health. She never again appeared on television and died in Cleveland five years later at the age of 96.

In 2003, Fuldheim was posthumously awarded an Ohio Historical Marker for her contributions to journalism, which is displayed in front of the WEWS studios.
