= Bob "Hoolihan" Wells =

American television personality (1933–2026)

- Bob "Hoolihan" Wells, c. 1966
- Born: Robert D. Wells; September 27, 1933; West Point, Nebraska, U.S.
- Died: October 21, 2026 (aged 93); Clearwater, Florida, U.S.
- Occupations: Television personality, weatherman, disc jockey; owner, financial company, BW Financial Services
- Years active: 1951–1982
- Spouse: Barbara Leigh (m. 1956; died 2007)
- Children: 3

Robert D. Wells (September 27, 1933 – October 21, 2026), known as Bob "Hoolihan" Wells, was an American television and radio personality and actor who is best known for his appearances on the then-CBS affiliate WJW TV Channel 8 during the 1960s and 1970s as "Hoolihan the Weatherman" and one-half of the Hoolihan and Big Chuck Show movie hosting team. Wells and partner Charles "Big Chuck" Schodowski replaced the former movie host, Ernie Anderson aka "Ghoulardi," in 1966 when Anderson left for Los Angeles to pursue a free-lance announcing and acting career.

The Hoolihan and Big Chuck Show aired late Friday nights on WJW for 13 years from December 23, 1966 to August 1979, when Wells left the show and relocated to Florida, to new Christian TV station, WCLF-TV, to co-host with wife, Barbara, a daily 90-minute interview, news, and music program, called "Horizons 22". After Wells' departure, Schodowski promoted cast member John "Lil' John" Rinaldi to co-host and the show continued for another 28 years as The Big Chuck and Lil' John Show.

== Early life ==
Wells was born in West Point, Nebraska, on September 27, 1933. He started his broadcasting career in the summer of 1951 on KWBE radio in Beatrice, Nebraska, after graduating from high school in Lincoln, Nebraska. That fall, Wells moved back to Lincoln to pursue studies in radio and television at the University of Nebraska. Between 1951 and his college graduation in 1957, he worked at Lincoln radio stations KLMS and KLIN, was in the ROTC program, and took time off from his studies to train as a military jet pilot, later serving with the Nebraska Air National Guard.

Upon finishing college in 1957, Wells joined KWTV in Oklahoma City as an announcer, moving two years later to WDAF, the NBC radio affiliate in Kansas City, Missouri. Wells then transitioned to television, becoming a weekend weatherman and staff announcer at the sister NBC television station WDAF-TV in Kansas City, a job he held until 1965. During this time, Wells also resumed his flying career by joining the Air Force Reserve, flying C-124 cargo planes, first on weekends, then for a year of active duty during the Berlin Crisis of 1961.

== Cleveland years ==
Wells in an advertisment for WJW-TV Channel 8 in 1966

In 1965, Wells moved to Cleveland to replace Howard Hoffman as the 6 and 11 PM evening weatherman on WJW-TV Channel 8, then the local CBS affiliate, as "Hoolihan the Weatherman." WJW management was seeking a "funny" weatherman to contrast with the "serious" style of other local weather presenters, including Dick Goddard of WKYC, Don Webster of WEWS, and the departing Hoffman. Wells got the job by dressing up in a grass skirt and improvising a humorous audition. Station management named him "Hoolihan the Weatherman" and the name stuck. Wells' presentations, which included jokes and always ended with "Hoolihan's" catch phrase "Sunshine to you, no matter what the weather," achieved #1 in the local ratings. Despite this success, a year later when WJW had the opportunity to hire Dick Goddard, the station gave Goddard the weeknight time slots and moved Wells to noon and weekend weathercasts.

In addition to his weatherman duties, Wells appeared as a supporting cast member for WJW's popular late-night Friday show Shock Theater with Ghoulardi, hosted by Ernie Anderson. When Anderson left WJW in late 1966, Wells teamed up with then-station engineer "Big Chuck" Schodowski to develop and host a replacement for Shock Theatre. The Hoolihan and Big Chuck Show premiered on December 23, 1966. Airing at 11:30 p.m. on Friday nights, the show presented Z-grade movies with comedy skits in between featuring Wells, Schodowski, and cast members including Art Lofredo, Russ Cormier (as "Big Stash") and John "Lil' John" Rinaldi, plus occasional Hollywood guest stars. The skits often focused on local or ethnic humor, and usually ended in a recorded distinctive laugh by late actor/comedian/disc jockey Jay Lawrence, who worked for KYW-1100 radio in Cleveland in the early 1960s. Hoolihan and Big Chuck quickly became the number one show in Cleveland on Friday nights, beating out Johnny Carson's Tonight Show and eventually making so much money that station management refused to pre-empt or move the show for CBS network programming, even for a Cleveland Cavaliers basketball game. In 1971, Wells quit the staff of WJW to free-lance as an announcer in other cities such as New York, Chicago and Detroit, but still did weekend weather and the Hoolihan and Big Chuck Show.

Wells and his wife Barbara became born-again Christians in the mid-70s, and for two years Wells managed a Parma, Ohio Christian radio station, WSUM (now WCCD). In August 1979, Wells left Cleveland and moved to Florida to pursue a career in Christian broadcasting. Schodowski replaced Wells with new co-host "Lil' John" Rinaldi and continued the Friday night show for another 28 years as The Big Chuck and Lil' John Show, finally ending in 2007 after a combined total run of 40 years.

== Later years ==
In 1979, Wells became program director of WCLF-TV channel 22, a Christian television station located in Largo, Florida and serving the Tampa Bay area. WCLF went on the air in October 1979 as the flagship station for the newly founded Christian Television Network, which aired programming such as The PTL Club and The 700 Club. Wells and his wife also co-hosted an evening 90-minute Christian-themed interview, music and news program on WCLF called Horizons 22. According to Wells, after a board member of WCLF objected to them on the show as lacking in spirituality (saying, "They look good, they sound good, but I just don't feel The Spirit moving there"), Wells and his wife were let go from WCLF after only three months. Later, John Wesley Fletcher, a founding member of the board of WCLF (and the one who objected to the Wells), was implicated in sex scandals involving PTL Club co-host Jim Bakker. Wells has expressed relief that he and his wife were no longer involved with the station by that time. Following WCLF, Wells would continue to work for other Tampa Bay stations for short periods, including WFLA-TV (as local host of The Baxters in 1981), WTOG (as weatherman and station personality), and Group W Cable (as spokesperson).

Wells went on to own and operate a financial planning company in Florida for 33 years. He also continued to do radio and TV commercial work, and has been active in local theater. He has made regular annual appearances at "Ghoulardifest" functions in Cleveland, held in tribute to Ernie Anderson, who died in 1997.

As of 2007, Wells was semi-retired and living in Clearwater, Florida, continuing his commercial, acting and community service work.

== Film and television show appearances ==
Over the years, Wells appeared in several films and television shows, most notably Carl Reiner's 1985 film Summer Rental starring John Candy, Richard Crenna and Rip Torn, which was filmed in the Tampa Bay area. Wells played the part of attorney Stan Greene, and his wife Barbara appeared in two bit parts as a neighbor and a yacht club official. Wells also appeared in the 1970 film Ghetto Freaks, which was filmed in Cleveland.

Wells' television roles include playing a television reporter in the 1980 made-for-TV film OHMS and a news anchor in a 1990 episode of the TV series Superboy entitled "Abandon Earth".

In 2019 Wells, Rinaldi, and Schodowski reunited to film the five-episode web series Space Ship One.

== Personal life and death ==
In 1956, Wells married Barbara Leigh, who later became one of the first female disc jockeys in Cleveland on WJW-850 (now WKNR). They had three children and were married for 51 years until Barbara's death from cancer on August 28, 2007.

Wells died from liver cancer at his home in Clearwater, Florida, on October 21, 2026, at the age of 93.

== Awards and honors ==
- Between 1966 and 1979, won several local Emmy awards as a cast member of The Hoolihan and Big Chuck Show
- Radio/Television Broadcasters' Hall of Fame of Ohio inductee (class of 2007)
- 2010 Cleveland Association of Broadcasters "Legend" Award
