= KCID =

Radio station in Caldwell, Idaho

- Caldwell, Idaho; United States
- Frequency: 1490 kHz
- Branding: Radio Catolica Sal y Luz

Programming
- Format: Spanish Religious

Ownership
- Owner: Salt & Light Radio

History
- First air date: 1947
- Call sign meaning: K Caldwell IDaho

Technical information
- Licensing authority: FCC
- Facility ID: 68593
- Class: C
- Power: 1,000 watts unlimited
- Transmitter coordinates: 43°39′51″N 116°38′10″W
- Translator: (93.7 MHz) K229DH (Caldwell)

Links
- Public license information: Public file; LMS
- Website: salyluzradio.com

KCID (1490 AM) (now Salt & Light's local Spanish Catholic) is a radio station broadcasting a Spanish religious format. Licensed to Caldwell, Idaho, United States, the station serves the Boise area. The station is currently owned by Salt & Light Radio.

Former owners Journal Broadcast Group announced on July 22, 2009 that KCID, along with sister station KGEM 1140AM, were to be sold to Salt & Light Radio for $950,000. The sale closed on September 25, 2009, and the station has been converted to Salt & Light's local Spanish Catholic radio format.
