= Big Chuck and Lil' John =

American television personalities

- Charles Schodowski (right) and John Rinaldi (left), c. 1986.
- Genre: Late night horror hosts; Sketch comedy
- Starring: Charles "Big Chuck" Schodowski; "Lil' John" Rinaldi
- Opening theme: "Here We Go Again" by Ray Charles; "Catch As Catch Can" by Burt Bacharach
- Ending theme: "Is That All There Is?" by Peggy Lee
- Country of origin: United States
- Original language: English
- No. of seasons: 28

Production
- Production location: Cleveland, Ohio
- Running time: 2 hr. 30 min.

Original release
- Network: WJW (channel 8)
- Release: September 2, 1979 – June 16, 2007

Related
- Ghoulardi

Big Chuck and Lil' John were a duo of entertainers and horror hosts based in Cleveland, Ohio, United States, consisting of Charles Mitchell "Big Chuck" Schodowski (June 28, 1934 – January 19, 2025) and "Lil' John" Rinaldi (born January 19, 1946). They co-hosted a late-night program over Cleveland television station WJW (channel 8) from 1979 until 2007, but Schodowski's tenure at the station dated back to 1961, first as a technician, then as a sidekick for Ghoulardi (Ernie Anderson) and a co-host alongside Bob "Hoolihan" Wells. In addition to hosting a movie with a live audience, they also performed original sketch comedy routines.

On September 10, 2011, WJW began airing a weekly half-hour program – simply titled Big Chuck and Lil' John – featuring classic show skits along with limited new production.

== History ==
Chuck Schodowski began his career as a producer/engineer at KYW-TV in 1961, then joined WJW-TV in the same capacity within several months. Upon joining WJW, he was tasked to do production for Ernie's Place, a movie showcase starring announcer Ernie Anderson and comedian/writer Tom Conway (later known as Tim Conway), as Anderson falsely claimed Conway had directorial experience. When Conway left the station after being discovered by Rose Marie, Anderson was cast as horror host Ghoulardi. Schodowski was instrumental in bringing in the blend of blues and polka music that helped define the show, adding comic audio drop-ins to enliven the often awful movies, and immortalized The Rivingtons' tune "Papa Oom Mow Mow" by marrying it to the image of an old man gurning. Anderson utilized Schodowski as a sidekick in comedy skits, including a controversial spoof of Peyton Place called Parma Place that played heavily to ethnic stereotypes in the Cleveland suburb.

When Anderson left Cleveland for California in 1966, his popular Ghoulardi character was retired, and a talent search ensued to find a replacement. Schodowski agreed to help Bob Wells (WJW's "Hoolihan the Weatherman") with his audition, and the management decided they liked the way the two performed together. They became co-hosts of The Hoolihan and Big Chuck Show, which launched on December 23, 1966. In addition to screening horror films, the duo soon started filming comedy skits interspersed within the host segments.

After Wells left the show in 1979, John Rinaldi, a jeweler by trade who had already been featured on many of the program's skits, took over as co-host. The show itself was relaunched as The Big Chuck and Lil' John Show, and while effectively a separate and distinct show, the familiar Catch As Catch Can theme was retained, among other show elements. Moreover, taped skits from the preceding show often would be rerun on The Big Chuck and Lil' John Show through various "oldies nights".

For many years, the show aired at 11:30 p.m. on Friday nights before moving to 11:30 p.m. on Saturday nights starting on October 1, 1988 (to accommodate The Arsenio Hall Show, which WJW was airing following their weeknight 11 p.m. newscasts), then back to Fridays following WJW's affiliation switch to Fox in 1994.

After Fox acquired WJW in 1996, the movies selected for The Big Chuck and Lil' John Show were no longer done by either host, and began to deviate from the original horror/science fiction genre into more conventional movie fare. In addition, the start time was again moved in 1996 to Saturdays at midnight following Mad TV, then after Fox debuted Talkshow with Spike Feresten in 2006, the show settled in its final start time of 12:30 a.m. Saturday nights/Sunday mornings.

Along with the Saturday night shows, Schodowski and Rinaldi hosted a companion Couch Potato Theater program airing from 10 a.m. - noon on Saturday mornings, which featured at various times Three Stooges shorts, episodes of The Abbott and Costello Show, movies, cartoons, or (due to schedule conflicts) an hour long skits only show.

In December 2006, Schodowski announced he would retire in June 2007. As part of his farewell, WJW broadcast the hour-long retrospective Big Chuck and Lil' John: The End of an Era. This also marked the end of The Big Chuck and Lil' John Show, with the last regular episode airing the afternoon of June 16, 2007.

During the summer of 2011, it was announced that Big Chuck and Lil' John would return to TV on WJW every Saturday morning at 11 a.m. (this time, in a 30-minute all skits show similar to the Couch Potato Theater format). This version of the show began on September 10, 2011. In 2015, the show was moved to Sunday nights at 11:30 p.m. The show moved to Monday mornings at 12:30 a.m. in 2021, and as of July 2021 the show has been retitled The Best of Big Chuck and Lil' John and introductions to the skits have been dropped.

Lil' John made news in December 2014, after Cincinnati Bengals head coach Marvin Lewis referred to Cleveland Browns quarterback Johnny Manziel as a "midget". WJW sent the 4-foot-3-inch (130 cm) Rinaldi to Cincinnati to cover Lewis' weekly press conference, and he asked the coach some questions.

In 2019 the duo reunited with Wells to film the five-episode web series Space Ship One.

Schodowski died in January 2025, at the age of 90. Rinaldi retired as "Lil' John" in September 2025.

== Notable sketches and parodies ==
- Ben Crazy: A parody of a popular 1960s TV medical drama, Ben Casey with Big Chuck as the title character. Originated on Hoolihan & Big Chuck, but had additional sketches filmed throughout the entire run of Big Chuck & Lil' John.
- The Certain Ethnic _____: A play on Big Chuck's Polish heritage featuring Chuck as "Stash Kowalski" – a stereotypical Polish Clevelander (e.g., The Certain Ethnic Motorist, who drives through red traffic lights and stops at green lights). Big Chuck specifically created the term "certain ethnic" as a euphemism for "Polish".
- The Kielbasa Kid: A parody of TV westerns, with Big Chuck as the bumbling hero. Originated on Hoolihan & Big Chuck.
- Readings By Robert: originated on Hoolihan & Big Chuck as a carbon copy of an Ernie Kovacs routine, with Bob Wells in the title role (patterned after Kovacs' "Percy Dovetonsils" character), and Big Chuck as his jazz-ukulele-playing assistant, Carlos. Occasionally rerun throughout the entire run of Big Chuck & Lil' John.
- Parma Place: A parody of the 1960s soap-opera Peyton Place. Originated on Ghoulardi, but was continuously rerun throughout the entire course of Hoolihan & Big Chuck and Big Chuck & Lil' John
- Soul Man: A parody of Superman where Big Chuck (as "Ed Tarboosh" – mild mannered TV producer) would – with the help of his "soul pills" – become Soul Man, who was a big, black, and bumbling superhero (played by longtime station cameraman Herb Thomas). Originated on Hoolihan & Big Chuck.
- Mary Hartski, Mary Hartski: A parody of the 1970s TV show Mary Hartman, Mary Hartman.
- Mariano "Mushmouth" Pacetti: A king of the weekly "Pizza Fight" during a six-year period on Hoolihan & Big Chuck.
- Cuyahoga Jones and the Castle of Doom: A parody of the Indiana Jones series, with Big Chuck as the title character – and Lil' John as his sidekick "Short Stuff" – chronicling their attempts to capture the "Kapusta Diamond". These skits were filmed at Squire's Castle in suburban Willoughby Hills.

At the end of most sketches is a very distinctive laugh. It was voiced by comedian/actor Jay Lawrence, who was a disc jockey for KYW radio in Cleveland during the early 1960s.

== Other cast members ==
Big Chuck and Lil' John would use some of WJW's personalities, like station meteorologist Dick Goddard, in their skits. A popular Goddard sketch revolved around Goddard's claims that WJW had the best doppler radar in Cleveland. He bragged that WJW's "Super Doppler Google-Plex" was powerful enough to see clearly to a neighborhood, close enough to reveal a woman taking a bath (strategically covered with bubbles) through her bathroom sunroof, as Goddard sheepishly tried to hide the image with his suit jacket. Goddard would appear in numerous skits through the years, sometimes even playing different characters.

Other longtime supporting players were veteran cameraman/technician Art Lofredo, who appeared in many skits through the years (most frequently as "The Old Man") and had several "Art Lofredo Nights" dedicated to him; Herb Thomas, a longtime station cameraman who portrayed "Soul Man", and Mary Allen ("the pride of Maple Heights"), who was an older lady and was a viewer who had won an auction in the late 1970s to appear on a skit. She impressed Big Chuck with her performance so much, she became a regular player on the show until the late 1990s, appearing most frequently as Stash Kowalski's wife Stella in "The Certain Ethnic ______" skits.

News anchor Robin Swoboda was famously featured as the main villain (a Catwoman takeoff) with several Cleveland Browns players portraying her henchmen in "Batguy & Rinaldi" (a parody of Batman & Robin), and sportscasters Casey Coleman, John Telich and Dan Coughlin were used in sports themed skits. Other later skits featured WJW station announcer Bill Ward announcing introductions to skits or for faux testimonial advertisements in the style of Hoolihan.

Owing to the station's long affiliation with the CBS television network, CBS stars like Buddy Ebsen and Andy Griffith made cameos in several skits, as well as Tim Conway (who like Big Chuck began his career on WJW as a sidekick of Ernie Anderson – though on a separate program) who by then was a star on CBS' The Carol Burnett Show. Athletes like Muhammad Ali, Earnie Shavers and Jack Lambert also made guest appearances in skits.

== Other show features ==
Both The Hoolihan and Big Chuck Show and The Big Chuck and Lil' John Show also made music video parodies as well, including Ray Stevens songs like "Gitarzan", "Indian Love Call" (the skit was titled "The Audio Engineer" and made extensive use of chromakey), "Along Came Jones", "The Streak" and "Bridget the Midget" (which was Lil' John's on-air debut on the show in 1970), plus other songs like Scott McKenzie's "San Francisco", Jimmy Castor Bunch's "Troglodyte", and Larry Groce's "Junk Food Junkie."

Both shows occasionally would feature a "New Talent Time" sketch where Cleveland area performers, usually performing some sort of offbeat stunt, would be featured. One week featured songwriter Robert McGuire performing his original song "Moon Over Parma", a song that mentioned a journey through the suburbs of Cleveland; the song would later become the theme song for the first season of The Drew Carey Show.

== Awards and honors ==
=== Big Chuck ===
- 29-time Lower Great Lakes Emmy Awards recipient
- 1994 Silver Circle Award, presented by Local Great Lakes Emmy Awards chapter
- Ohio Broadcasters Hall of Fame Inductee (class of 1991)
- Cleveland Association of Broadcasters Hall of Fame (class of 1999)

=== Lil' John ===
- 1995 Silver Circle Award, presented by Local Great Lakes Emmy Awards chapter
- 2001 Lower Great Lakes Emmy Award recipient (as co-host of The Big Chuck and Lil' John Show) - Regularly Scheduled Entertainment Program
- Ohio Broadcasters Hall of Fame Inductee (class of 1996)
- Cleveland Association of Broadcasters Hall of Fame (class of 1999)
