= James Monroe Houses =

Public housing development in the Bronx, New York

- NYCHA property
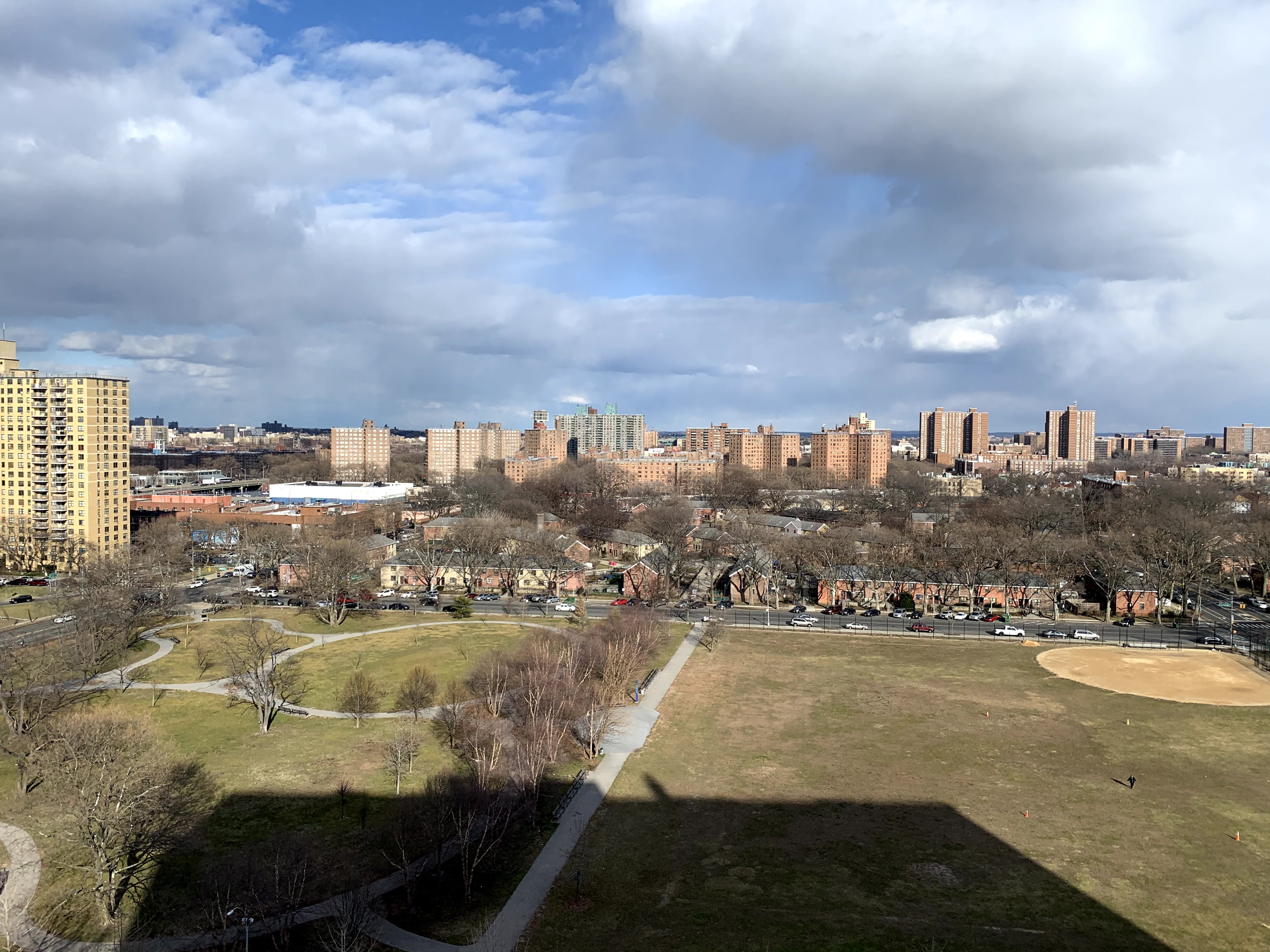
- The James Monroe and Clason Point Gardens Houses in 2020.
- Nickname: Monroe
- Interactive map of James Monroe Houses
- Coordinates: 40.8229°N 73.8652°W
- Country: United States
- State: New York
- City: New York City
- Borough: Bronx
- ZIP codes: 10473
- Area codes: 718, 347, 929, and 917

The James Monroe Houses or Monroe Houses are a housing project in Soundview, Bronx, New York City. The project consists of twelve buildings, 8, 14, and 15-stories tall with 1,102 apartment units. The 18.49-acre Bronx development is bordered by Soundview, Story, Taylor and Lafayette Avenues. It is owned and managed by New York City Housing Authority (NYCHA). It was completed on November 2, 1961 and named after the fifth President of the United States, James Monroe. The complex was designed by the architectural firm of Brown & Guenther.

== History ==
Planning for the development began during the 1950s. Records of the Citizens Housing and Planning Council from 1955 to 1957 identify the proposed project as the James Monroe Houses (Clason Point II), while later NYCHA records list Clason Point Area 2A as an alternate name for the development.

The federally funded development was constructed on previously vacant land in Soundview. It was designed by the architectural firm Brown & Guenther, with landscape design by Gilmore D. Clarke and Michael Rapuano. The project contained 1,102 apartments in twelve buildings ranging from eight to fifteen stories. NYCHA records list the development as completed on November 2, 1961.

In 2016, the James Monroe Houses were among several NYCHA developments identified by city officials as being named for historical figures who were slaveholders. Council members Robert Cornegy and Ritchie Torres called for NYCHA to consider a process for renaming such developments in consultation with residents and elected officials.

== Notable residents ==
- Wesley Snipes (born 1962), actor and martial artist
- Ed Pinckney (born 1963), former NBA player and assistant coach of the Minnesota Timberwolves
- Bernard McGuirk (1957–2022), radio personality and longtime producer and co-host at WABC
- Buddy Esquire (1958–2014), graphic designer known for creating early hip-hop flyers
- Paul LaRosa, journalist, author and television producer for 48 Hours
