= Tom Merriman =

Tom Merriman may refer to:

- Tom Merriman (composer)
- Tom Merriman (journalist)
