= Bob Franken =

American journalist

Robert E. Franken (1941-2026) was an American journalist and frequent guest on MSNBC. Franken was CNN's primary correspondent in President Clinton's impeachment. He specialized in political reporting and often used puns in his commentaries. In early 2007 Franken's contract was not renewed by CNN and he moved to rival MSNBC.

After leaving the University of Wisconsin after his freshman year, Franken began his career as news director at Marshfield, Wisconsin radio station WDLB. Then from 1970 to 1979, Franken was a news reporter at WJW-TV, then a CBS-TV affiliate in Cleveland. Franken reported on the great blizzards of 1977 and 1978 there, the financial default of the city, and the desegregation of the Cleveland Public Schools ruling by the late U.S. District Court Judge Frank J. Battisti. For his coverage of the Cleveland mayoral recall election of 1978, Franken won an Emmy Award. Franken became a reporter and bureau manager for Pittsburgh television station WPXI in 1981 and then became assignment editor and producer with the CBS News bureau in Washington, D.C. in 1983.

He covered combat in both Iraq wars, the White House during George W. Bush's presidency, the Clinton scandals, and the Supreme Court and Congress for ten years. He also reported extensively on the Guantanamo Bay prison camp.

He was a cousin of former Minnesota Senator Al Franken.

His daughter posted on Facebook that he passed away on October 21, 2026 after "a battle with aphasia and dementia."
