= Erin Moriarty (journalist) =

American journalist (born 1952)

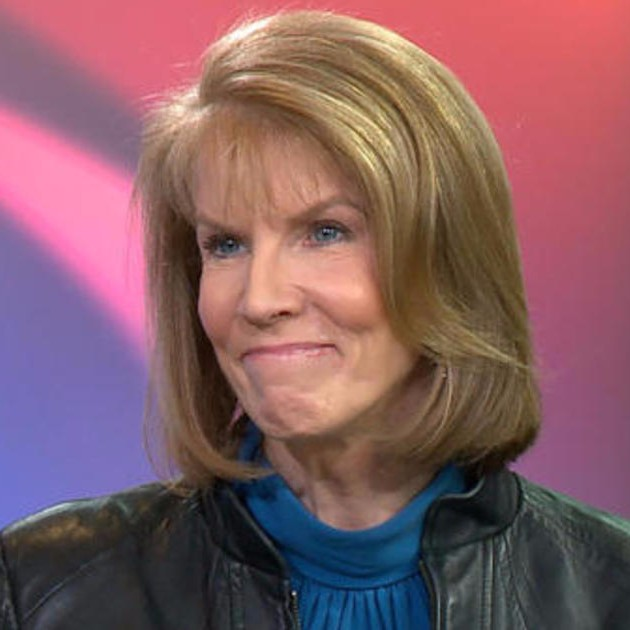
- Moriarty in 2017
- Born: April 6, 1952 (age 74); Cincinnati, Ohio, U.S.
- Education: Ohio State University (BA, JD)
- Occupations: News anchor, reporter, correspondent
- Notable credit(s): Emmy Award; Overseas Press Club; International Association of Women in Radio and Television Award
- Spouse: James Musuraca (m. 1983; died 2026)
- Children: 1

Erin F. Moriarty (born April 6, 1952) is an American television news reporter and correspondent. She works as a correspondent for 48 Hours Mystery. She has won national Emmy Awards several times.

== Early life ==
Moriarty attended Upper Arlington High School in Columbus, Ohio and is a Phi Beta Kappa graduate of Ohio State University, where she was also a sister of Kappa Kappa Gamma and was selected to Mortar Board National College Senior Honor Society. She received a J.D. degree from Ohio State University Moritz College of Law and is licensed to practice law in Ohio, Washington, D.C. and Maryland.

== Career ==
In 1979–1980, Moriarty worked as a reporter for a Columbus-based NBC affiliate WCMH-TV. She also cohosted the local PM Magazine program with Steve Shannon at WCMH-TV. In 1980-1982 for the Baltimore-based CBS (at the time, ABC) affiliate WJZ-TV and in 1982–1983 for CBS affiliate WJKW-TV in Cleveland.

From 1983 to 1986, Moriarty served as a consumer reporter for WMAQ-TV in Chicago. In 1986, she joined CBS News where she has served as a consumer correspondent for CBS This Morning and the CBS Evening News with Dan Rather. In 1990, she joined the CBS News program 48 Hours as a correspondent.

Moriarty has collaborated with colleague Nancy Giles on two weekly public-affairs radio series under the Giles and Moriarty banner, one for WPHT in Philadelphia in 2003-04 and another for Greenstone Media in 2007. Both shows were produced at the facilities of the CBS Radio Network.

In 2008, Moriarty co-authored "Death of a Dream" with Paul LaRosa, a CBS News producer. The book examines the 2005 murder of dancer Catherine Woods in New York, and the subsequent trial and conviction of Paul Cortez.

She has also been seen narrating recent episodes of 48 Hours Mystery.

== Awards ==
- 9-time national Emmy Award winner
- Recipient of the 2001 Overseas Press Club Award
- 2-time winner of the Association of Women in Radio and Television Gracie Allen Award
- Top 100 Award from Irish Magazine honoree
- Recipient of the Outstanding Consumer Media Service Award presented by the Consumer Federation of America
- Recipient of the Crime Hottie Award presented by True Crime Uncensored.

== Personal life ==
Moriarty lived in New York City with her husband, James Musuraca, who was also an attorney, and their son. Her husband died in January 2026.
