= WJW (TV) =

Television station in Cleveland

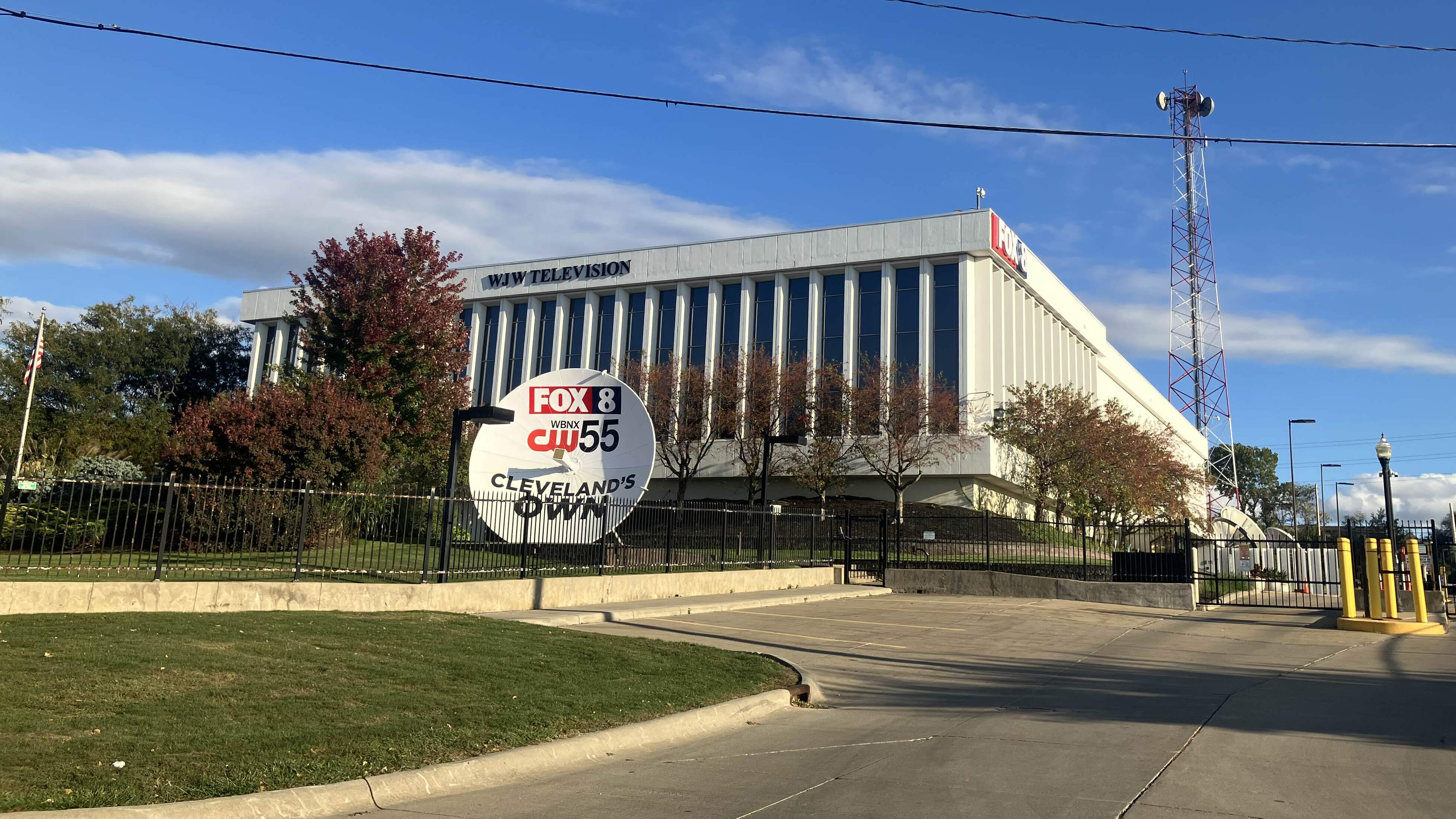
- WJW's studios on Dick Goddard Way, northeast of downtown Cleveland
- Cleveland, Ohio; United States
- Channels: Digital: 8 (VHF); Virtual: 8
- Branding: Fox 8

Programming
- Affiliations: 8.1: Fox; for others, see § Technical information and subchannels

Ownership
- Owner: Nexstar Media Group; (Tribune Broadcasting Company II, LLC)
- Sister stations: WBNX-TV; Tegna: WKYC

History
- First air date: December 17, 1949 (Note: The station began broadcasting on November 28, 1949, to air Captain Video and His Video Rangers on a nightly basis, but for testing purposes.)
- Former call signs: WXEL (1949–1956); WJW-TV (1956–1977; 1985–1998); WJKW-TV (1977–1985)
- Former channel numbers: Analog: 9 (VHF, 1949–1953), 8 (VHF, 1953–2009); Digital: 31 (UHF, 1999–2009)
- Former affiliations: DuMont and ABC (1949–1955); CBS (1955–1994)
- Call sign meaning: John F. Weimer, founder of WJW radio

Technical information
- Licensing authority: FCC
- Facility ID: 73150
- ERP: 11 kW
- HAAT: 342 m (1,122 ft)
- Transmitter coordinates: 41°21′48″N 81°42′57″W

Links
- Public license information: Public file; LMS
- Website: fox8.com

WJW (channel 8) is a television station in Cleveland, Ohio, United States, affiliated with the Fox network. It is owned by Nexstar Media Group alongside CW station WBNX-TV (channel 55); Nexstar's Tegna subsidiary owns NBC affiliate WKYC (channel 3). WJW and WBNX-TV share studios on Dick Goddard Way (previously South Marginal Road) northeast of downtown Cleveland; WJW's transmitter is located in suburban Parma, Ohio.

WJW signed on as WXEL, Cleveland's third television station, and was the first station built by Herbert Mayer, founder of the Empire Coil Company. WXEL began broadcasting over channel 9 on December 17, 1949, two years to the day of WEWS-TV's sign-on. Initially a DuMont affiliate with select ABC and CBS programs, WXEL placed an emphasis on locally produced programming, originally from their studios and transmitter site in Parma and later from a renovated former movie theatre in Playhouse Square. Mayer's attempt to build UHF stations in Portland, Oregon, and Kansas City succeeded in the former and failed in the latter, prompting the sale of Empire Coil—including WXEL—to Storer Broadcasting in January 1954, weeks after WXEL moved to channel 8. Storer purchased WJW radio later in 1954, then secured the CBS affiliation for WXEL in March 1955. After WXEL's downtown studios were renovated into a colonial-style building for radio and television, WXEL was renamed WJW-TV.

The station was an early career stepping stone for announcer Ernie Anderson and comedian Tim Conway, who co-hosted the late-morning movie in late 1961 until Conway was discovered by Rose Marie. From 1963 to 1966, Anderson portrayed horror host Ghoulardi, which had widespread popularity and has held a lasting cultural influence. After Anderson's departure, Bob "Hoolihan" Wells, "Big Chuck" Schodowski and "Lil' John" Rinaldi continued to host a weekly movie and comedy skit program on channel 8 for a combined 41 years. Doug Adair and Joel Daly co-anchored weeknight newscasts from 1963 to 1967, the first in the industry to market the newscasters, sportscaster and weather presenter as a cohesive on-air team. Dick Goddard became the station's chief meteorologist in 1965; he enjoyed an uninterrupted 51-year tenure recognized as a Guinness World Record upon his retirement. Goddard created the annual Woollybear Festival in Vermilion, Ohio, which the station continues to sponsor, and his on-air advocacy for animal welfare and pet adoption led to improved legislation against animal cruelty in Ohio. Under the direction of Virgil Dominic, channel 8's newscasts became the market leader throughout the 1980s, particularly with the lead anchor team of Tim Taylor, Robin Swoboda, Goddard, and sportscaster Casey Coleman.

WJW-TV became WJKW in 1977 after WJW radio was sold but reclaimed the WJW call sign in 1985. Following Storer's privatization by Kohlberg Kravis Roberts in 1985, WJW has had a succession of owners. After a failed sale to Lorimar-Telepictures, businessman George N. Gillett Jr. bought the Storer chain but lost the stations in a bankruptcy brought on by soured junk bond investments, with WJW mentioned specifically in sale rumors. New World Communications, headed by Ronald Perelman, acquired WJW and the Gillett group amidst a flurry of purchases across the country. New World then announced a group-wide affiliation pact with Fox on May 23, 1994, after the network invested $500 million into the company; WJW was the first of these stations to switch to Fox. While initially struggling to adjust to the new Fox affiliation, WJW's ratings recovered substantially, particularly after the network bought WJW and the other New World stations in late 1996. Since Fox sold the station in 2008, WJW has been owned by Local TV LLC, Tribune Broadcasting and Nexstar. Nexstar purchased WBNX in early 2025, then acquired WKYC parent Tegna the following year.

== Signing on as WXEL channel 9 ==
A practicing lawyer in New York City, Herbert Mayer became intrigued by manufacturing and left the legal profession in 1944 to establish the Empire Coil Company in New Rochelle, New York, making coils for the war effort. As World War II ended, the company's factory was converted to manufacture transformers and RF coils for radio sets. Inspired by a keynote address from RCA chairman David Sarnoff extolling the potential of television, Mayer sought to expand into broadcasting. Empire Coil applied with the Federal Communications Commission (FCC) for a television station on channel 9 in Cleveland on September 27, 1947. Empire's channel 9 application was one of two additional channels proposed for Cleveland, joining Scripps-Howard's WEWS-TV (channel 5) and NBC-owned WNBK (channel 4); five applicants sought the other channel, including the DuMont Television Network and radio stations WHK, WJW and WGAR. The FCC granted the construction permit for Empire on October 30, 1947; land for the station's studios and transmitter site were secured on a knoll on Pleasant Valley Road in Parma, 617 feet (188 m) above sea level, thought to be among the highest elevations in Cuyahoga County.

The FCC implemented a "freeze" on issuing any additional television licenses in September 1948 that consequently delayed WXEL's launch by several months. While it was hoped WXEL could transmit test patterns by May 1949, the channel number and thus frequency was now in doubt: Cleveland was originally allocated channels on 2, 4, 5, 7 and 9, but earlier in 1948, FCC and Canadian regulators had proposed moving channel 7 to Akron in exchange for channel 11, and moving channel 9 to Canton, Ohio. By April 1949, this was altered to have channel 9 moved to Canada. (Note: Complicating matters, two applicants were vying for the channel 11 allocation in Akron; following the end of the "freeze", this allocation was moved to the UHF band on channel 49.) WXEL thus was unable to complete installation of equipment. The FCC revised the allotment table by July 1949, adding two additional UHF channels to Cleveland; WXEL remained on channel 9.

Herbert Mayer, founder of Empire Coil and WXEL

WXEL initially had not decided on a primary affiliation and considered having links to multiple networks, similar to how WEWS carried shows from DuMont, CBS and ABC. Russell F. Spiers, one of Herbert Mayer's former professors at Colgate University, was hired as WXEL's program director and had living quarters at the station's Parma facilities. By October, WXEL set a tentative launch date for December 17 and signed up as a primary DuMont affiliate along with ABC and CBS shows WEWS did not carry and shows from the Paramount Television Network. Regular programming actually began during the station's testing phase on November 28, 1949, when engineers screened DuMont's Captain Video and His Video Rangers on a nightly basis at 7 p.m. The first night of programming on December 17, 1949, was mostly impromptu with DuMont star Morey Amsterdam serving as emcee; during his remarks, Amsterdam repeatedly transposed the call sign by accident as "WEXL".

Howard Hoffman, formerly with WHK and a onetime singer for the Texaco Star Theater, joined WXEL prior to sign-on as an announcer and weather forecaster. John FitzGerald joined five months after sign-on as an announcer and nightly sportscaster; FitzGerald remained with the station until the booth announcer position was eliminated in 1982, while Hoffman stayed until his 1986 retirement. Alice Weston joined WXEL in November 1950 from WEWS, hosting a daily home economics and cooking show that WSPD-TV in Toledo simulcast. Soupy Sales, then known as Soupy Hines, hosted a daily show on WXEL from 1951 to 1953; it was at WXEL that Sales first used the pie in the face gag that became a staple of his comedy routine.

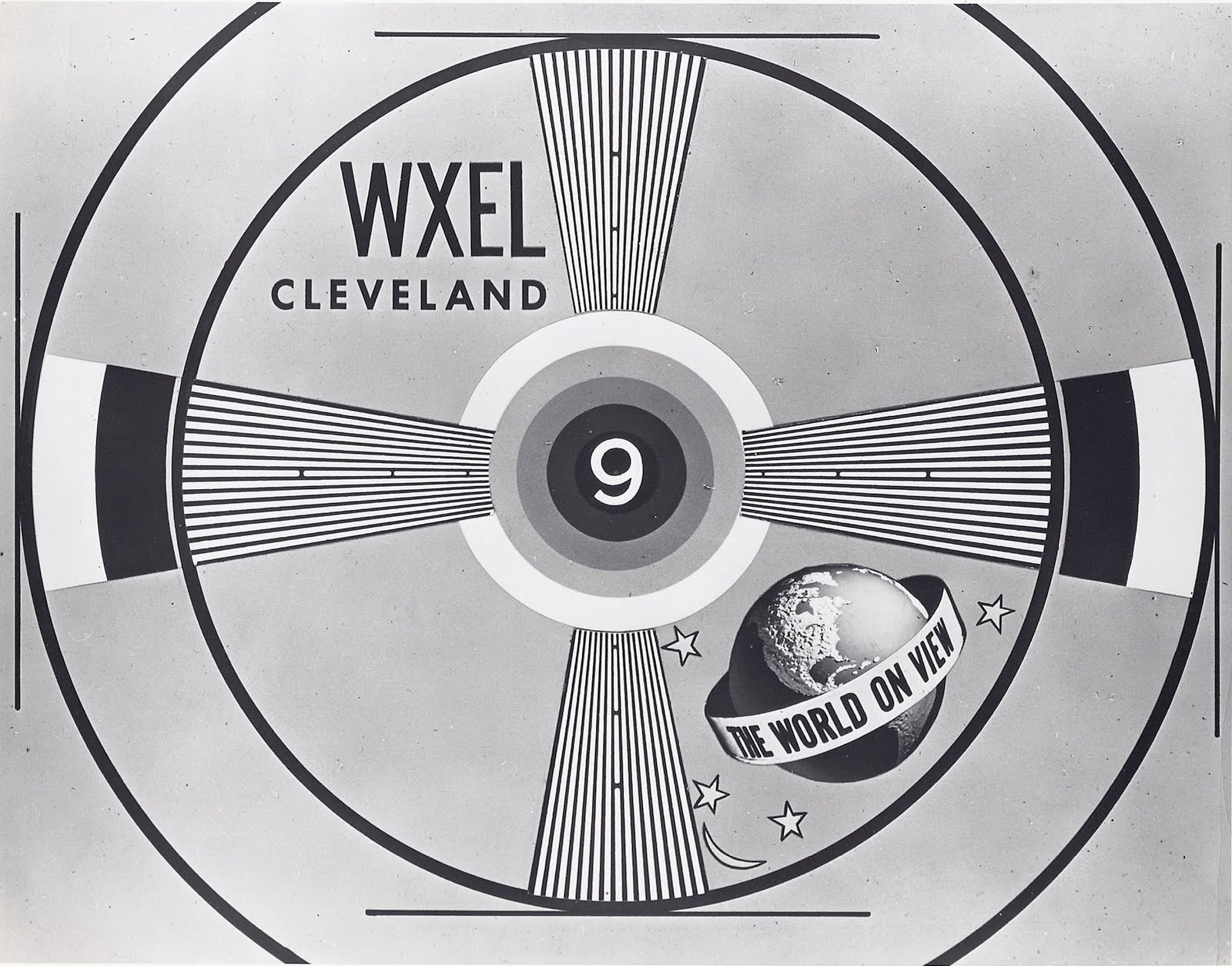
WXEL test pattern slide

The station quickly established itself in sports, signing up to carry both Cleveland Indians baseball called by Jimmy Dudley and Jack Graney, and Cleveland Browns football called by Bob Neal. WXEL's Browns coverage was carried over the DuMont network as part of their NFL coverage. Horse racing was telecast live from Ascot Park and Cranwood Park, along with International Boxing Association matches from Cleveland Arena. Indians baseball remained on WXEL until 1955, when the team moved to WEWS. Warren Guthrie, head of the speech department at Western Reserve University, became WXEL's first newscaster with the nightly Your Sohio Reporter, which debuted on May 7, 1951, and aired nightly at 11 p.m. Guthrie's newscast was regionally syndicated to a network of stations across Ohio. For a short time in 1952, Paul Newman did live commercial reads for National City, which sponsored a nightly news analysis program that directly followed Your Sohio Reporter.

A phased expansion of WXEL's facilities was launched under Empire in 1951: the Pleasant Valley Road studio/transmitter building was first quadrupled in size, and the company signed a long-term lease of the former Esquire Theatre on Euclid Avenue. The Esquire, a movie theater in the city's Playhouse Square district, had closed earlier in the year due to competition from television. While the renovated Esquire was regarded as "Studio D", this facility became WXEL's main studio, supplanting the Parma plant. Mayer additionally created a mascot for WXEL, Little Ajax the Elephant, and wrote a children's book based on the character.

== Changing to channel 8, Storer, CBS and WJW-TV ==
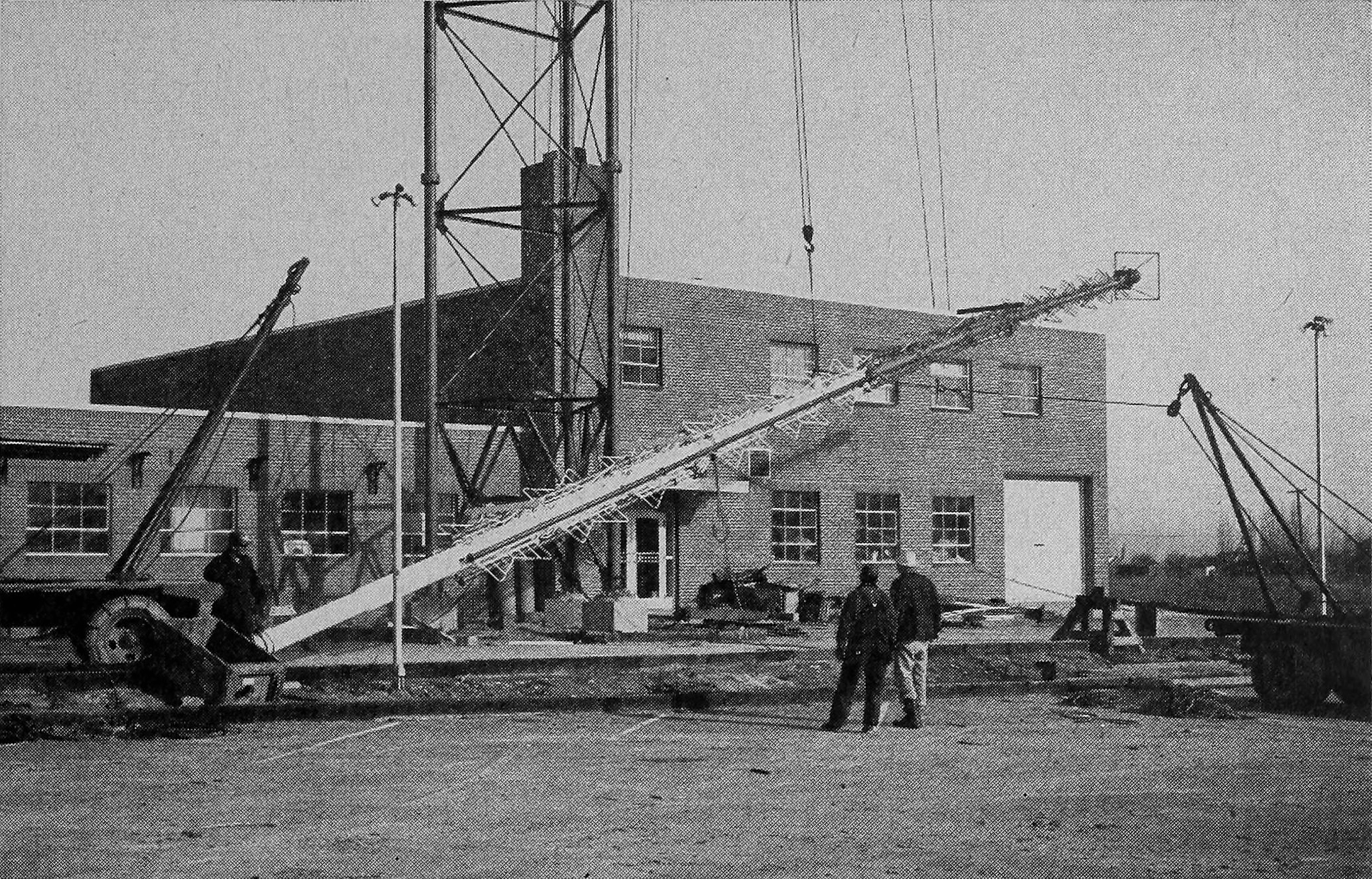
Workers raising a 73-foot (22 m) antenna for use on WXEL's new 775-foot (236 m) tower, erected in 1953 when the station moved to channel 8.

In the span of 2 years, 4 months and 5 days, every aspect of the station—the channel number, ownership, network affiliation and the call sign—changed. The first change occurred at midnight on December 10, 1953, when WXEL moved from channel 9 to 8. The switchover was dictated by the FCC in their 1952 Sixth Report and Order, which included several allocation revisions; this also affected WNBK, which needed to move to channel 3. WXEL's move was necessary for WSTV-TV in Steubenville, Ohio, to sign on on channel 9 and enabled WXEL to construct a taller tower with an increase in power.

Empire began to expand after the FCC's "freeze" was lifted. KPTV (channel 27) in Portland, Oregon, debuted in 1952 as the first commercial UHF station authorized by the agency. An additional station, KCTY (channel 25) in Kansas City, Missouri, signed on the following year, and Empire sought UHF permits in Indianapolis and Denver. KCTY's existence was short as two VHF competitors took to the air several months later, leaving KCTY as a sole DuMont affiliate. This, plus a reluctance by the Kansas City market to purchase UHF converters, resulted in a nearly $750,000 loss (equivalent to $9.03 million in 2025) for Empire. On December 31, 1953, Empire sold KCTY to DuMont for $1: the low sale price reflected Mayer's wishes to dispose of the station but reluctance to take it dark. Days later, Empire Coil was sold to Storer Broadcasting for $8.5 million (equivalent to $102 million in 2025), including WXEL, KPTV and the New Rochelle factory; the sale was attributed to KCTY's financial failure and a decline in Empire's coil manufacturing business.

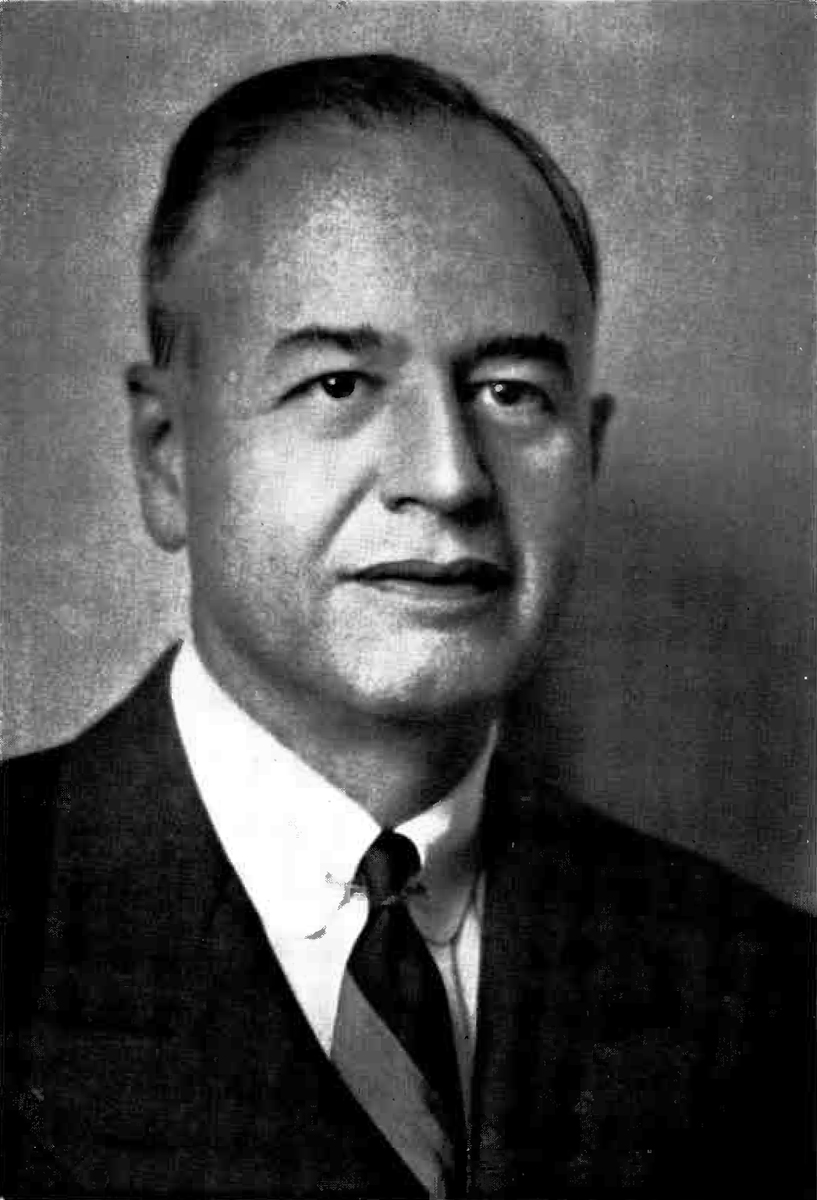
George B. Storer

Approval was contingent on Storer selling off KGBS and KGBS-TV in San Antonio, along with the FCC revising ownership limits so a company could own seven television stations, five on VHF; the latter took place in late September. Prior to consummation, Storer purchased WJW for $330,000 on October 8, 1954. This paired WJW with a television station. After the FCC removed Cleveland's fourth VHF allocation, WJW had filed for a UHF license on channel 19 but withdrew after determining it was not economically viable. Company president George B. Storer regarded Cleveland as "such a swell market" when explaining the two purchases, but family ties to the city also existed: a street in the city was named after his great-grandfather, and an ancestor was the first child born in the Connecticut Western Reserve. Storer previously served as a vice-president for Republic Steel and the company was originally founded to operate gas stations in Cleveland and Toledo before venturing into broadcasting.

Storer's entry into Cleveland immediately set off speculation over a new network affiliation for WXEL, which was now primarily an ABC affiliate with select DuMont programs. An affiliation swap was announced between WXEL and WEWS in early December 1954, with WXEL becoming a primary CBS station; in what was regarded as an industry surprise, WGAR renewed their CBS Radio contract, and WJW remained with ABC Radio. WXEL joined CBS on March 2, 1955. The affiliation switch, coupled with the collapse of DuMont, prompted the Browns to have their games televised on a 22-station regional network fed by WEWS beginning with the 1955 season. While CBS assumed broadcast rights to the NFL in 1956, the Browns kept their separate network arrangement until 1958.

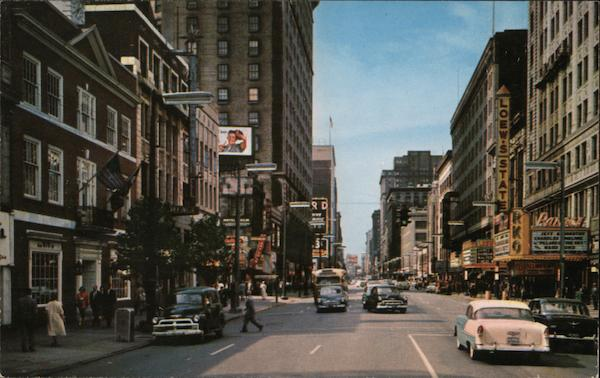
Playhouse Square, c. early 1960s. WJW-TV's Colonial Revival studios are to the far left; the Palace and State theatres are to the right.

Storer renovated WXEL's Euclid Avenue studios to house WJW radio as well as the television station. A colonial design was chosen as it contrasted significantly from the buildings that surrounded it. The interior evoked 1770-era Georgian architecture, accommodating up to 40 different studios for both radio and television. A cupola added to the top drew comparison to Independence Hall, and a greenhouse was built facing the general manager's office. The grand opening for the facility coincided with WXEL's renaming to WJW-TV on April 15, 1956; the call sign change and building's dedication was telecast live, including a flyover by the Ohio Air National Guard and Cleveland mayor Anthony Celebrezze proclaiming "WJW Week" for the city. Mayer intended to reuse the WXEL call sign for a planned UHF station in Boston. (Note: While this did not happen, the PBS station in West Palm Beach, Florida, renamed itself WXEL-TV in 1985; that station's program manager previously worked at the Cleveland WXEL in the early 1950s.) The colonial architecture and façade would soon be implemented at other Storer stations, including WGBS in Miami and WJBK-TV's studio building in Detroit.

== The Playhouse Square years ==
WJW-TV became a centerpiece of local programming throughout their time at Playhouse Square. Jim Doney joined the station in 1952 as an announcer and news reader; by December 1962, he became the host of Adventure Road, a daily showcase of filmed travelogues and in-studio interviews. Adventure Road became a staple at channel 8 for over 12 years and survived a 1973 schedule realignment where WJW began to carry CBS's daytime lineup on a more consistent basis. After the show ended in 1975, Doney joined KGMB in Honolulu. Character actor Ray Stawiarski portrayed lederhosen-wearing children's show host "Franz the Toymaker" beginning in 1964 and running through the rest of the decade. WJW radio talent additionally appeared on channel 8: Casey Kasem (known as "Casey on the Mike" at the radio station) hosted Cleveland Bandstand from 1959 to 1960, while morning host Ed Fisher portrayed Bozo the Clown for a local version of The Bozo Show from 1960 to 1968. Cleveland Indians baseball games also returned to channel 8 beginning with the 1960 season. WJW-TV was also one of two taping sites in 1967 for the syndicated game show Matches 'n Mates, hosted by Art James, at a time when such shows were filmed in either New York City or Los Angeles.

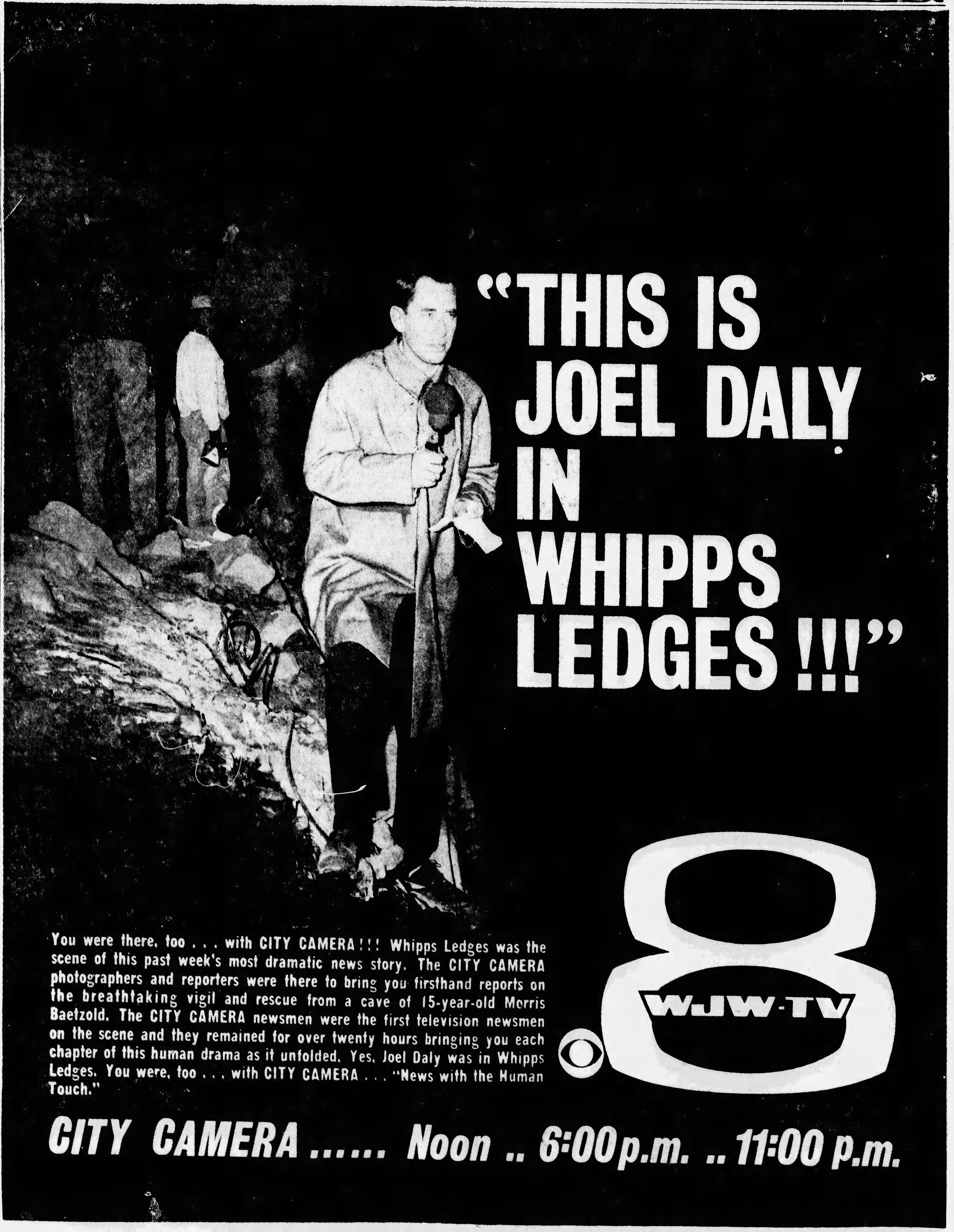
Joel Daly was a reporter and anchor for WJW-TV from 1963 to 1967; this advertisement shows him on the scene of a rescue at Whipps Ledges in Hinckley Township.

Doug Adair joined WJW in September 1957 as an announcer and studio host before switching to the news department the following year. The station launched City Camera News as a five-minute news roundup directly following Guthrie, who eschewed coverage of local news due to being syndicated and did not cover the 1954 Sam Sheppard trial. City Camera's title came from the usage of Polaroid photographs taken at the scene of news events, which were then attached to cork board and broadcast on-air. By 1963, Adair was part of the station's 11 p.m. news alongside Guthrie, sportscaster FitzGerald and weatherman Hoffman, which began to be promoted on-air as a team. Guthrie was replaced by WEWS news director Joel Daly in September 1963, expanding City Camera to a half-hour broadcast. Daly was teamed in-studio with Adair for the 11 p.m. news, increasingly competitive in the ratings against Bill Jorgensen at KYW-TV and eventually became the market leader, retrospectively described as "the most formidable news team in the city". The 11 p.m. news was also the first newscast of any kind to directly combine the weather report and sportscast into the same program, and was the first to use the "happy talk" format.

Veteran announcer Ken Coleman, who had increased visibility due to CBS's policy of local announcers calling NFL games for the network, joined WJW in late 1964 as lead sportscaster but left in 1966 to become the radio voice of the Boston Red Sox. ABC hired away Daly in 1967 to anchor for WBKB-TV, their owned-and-operated station in Chicago, with Martin Ross taking over for Daly. Adair left WJW for WKYC in the fall of 1970, signing an unprecedented four-year contract. Adair's replacement was veteran newsman Murray Stewart; Ross died from cancer in April 1973, while Stewart was moved to the noon news the following year due to declining health. Under the anchor team of Jim Hale and Jeff Maynor, WJW's ratings declined significantly against a resurgent WEWS, which also adopted a "happy talk" format consulted by Frank Magid.

A new three-story building was constructed for WJW on South Marginal Drive, near the Lake Erie shoreline, between 1974 to 1975. When inaugurated on November 2, 1975, the new studios were an upgrade in size from 29,000 to 75,600 square feet (2,690 to 7,020 m^{2}); management hoped to produce additional local programming, and one studio was purpose-built for newscasts.

== Ernie Anderson and Ghoulardi ==
A former announcer at WHK and KYW-TV, Ernie Anderson joined WJW-TV on July 17, 1961, as host of Ernie's Place, a late-morning movie interlaced with comedy skits. Tom Conway—a former KYW copywriter, personality, and collaborator with Anderson on commercials—was named as co-host. Conway was hired at WJW on recommendation from Anderson, who falsely claimed he had television director experience; Charles Schodowski, another former KYW staffer now at WJW, was asked by Anderson to do Conway's job. The program ended after Rose Marie, who visited the station as part of a CBS promotional junket among the affiliates, sent tapes of the duo's material to Steve Allen, who hired Conway for his talk show. When cast in McHale's Navy, Tom Conway assumed the stage name Tim. Still under contract at WJW, Anderson focused on voiceover duties, becoming a pitchman for Millbrook Bread and Ohio Bell.

If you've been fortunate enough to miss Ghoulardi, it is only fair to say that this is a characterization Anderson has been doing for Channel 8 for about three years. As Ghoulardi, he dons a frightwig, goatee and a garment that appears to have been discarded by a city street cleaner. He looks much like a forlorn old goat who has been run out of the herd by a rival.

— James Flanigan, The Plain Dealer

When WJW acquired the local rights to the Shock Theater library, Anderson was tabbed as host of Ghoulardi under the belief an offbeat gimmick would make people overlook the poor quality of the movies. Debuting on January 18, 1963, Anderson's portrayal of Ghoulardi—wearing a white fright wig, fake Van Dyke beard and lab coat with a beatnik dialect and anarchist demeanor—attracted largely negative critical reviews but quickly became a ratings success and cult favorite, particularly among young children despite the late-night timeslot. At its peak, the show commanded 70 percent of the late-night audience, and the Cleveland Police Department reported a 35 percent decrease in juvenile crime. Anderson started to use Schodowski in comedy skits, including a controversial spoof of Peyton Place called Parma Place that played to stereotypes in the suburb's Polish American community. A traveling intramural sports team, the "Ghoulardi All-Stars", was organized that frequently played against area professional athletes, first responders and talent from rival stations, all for charity. In addition to the Ghoulardi persona, Anderson hosted weather reports during WJW's early-evening newscasts. Anderson starred in a half-hour comedy special in October 1965 that drew praise from Plain Dealer critic James Flanigan, who also said it was "in spite" of Ghoulardi.

After nearly four years portraying Ghoulardi, Anderson resigned from the station in mid-November 1966. Anderson had earlier taken a leave of absence from regular tapings to guest in Rango, also starring Conway, and grew tired of the character amid overtures from Conway and Jack Riley to move to Hollywood. Anderson later gave former fanatic-turned-gofer Ron Sweed permission to portray the character as spiritual successor The Ghoul. Rock bands Pere Ubu, Devo and The Cramps, along with singer Chrissie Hynde, comedian Drew Carey and filmmaker Jim Jarmusch, have all cited Ghoulardi as a direct inspiration.

== Dick Goddard ==
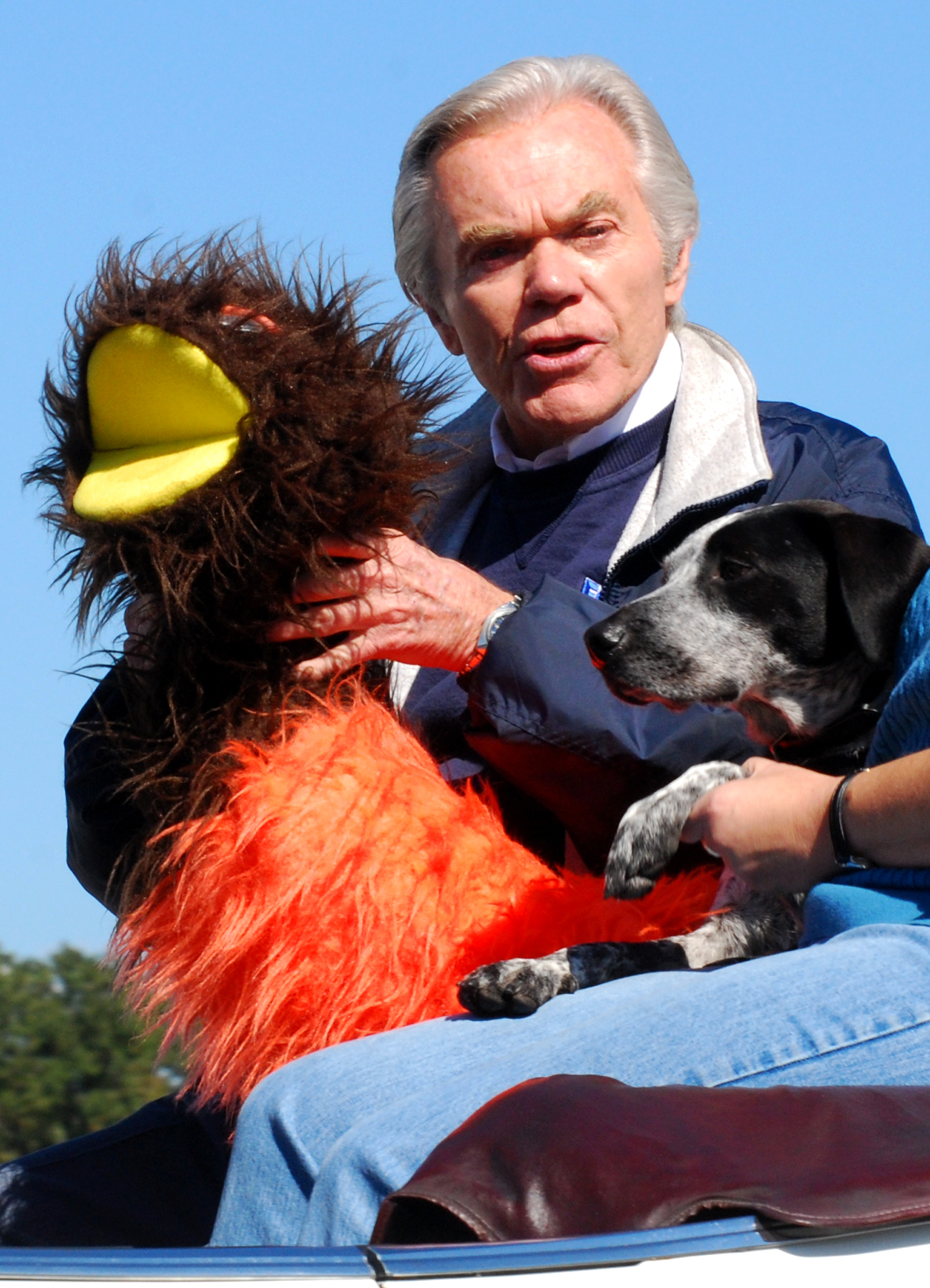
Dick Goddard at the 2008 Woollybear Festival

Dick Goddard began his on-air meteorological career in May 1961 at KYW-TV. A complicated FCC order in June 1965 had KYW-TV become WKYC due to a voided 1956 asset swap between NBC and Westinghouse Broadcasting (Group W) for stations in Cleveland and Philadelphia; this resulted in Goddard, under contract to Group W, relocating to Philadelphia and joining the renamed KYW-TV there. Unhappy in Philadelphia, Goddard left Group W after several weeks and was courted by WKYC, WEWS and WJW. Goddard chose WJW as it carried Browns games thanks to CBS's NFL contract; Goddard was the statistician for Browns radio broadcasts from 1966 to 2011. Ernie Anderson famously claimed he helped lure Goddard to WJW on an "athletic scholarship" for the "Ghoulardi All-Stars", which Goddard also played for. While signing a contract on September 3, 1965, Goddard did not debut until March 28, 1966, due to a non-compete clause with Group W. Goddard also did weather reports for WJW radio.

I wasn't Dick Goddard's competition, I was just in the same market at the same time. Cleveland was Dick Goddard's town, and still is.

— Al Roker, former Cleveland television meteorologist, to Mark Dawidziak

Goddard remained the station's chief meteorologist until retiring on November 22, 2016. His retirement came several months after Goddard's Law, which increased the severity of penalties for animal abuse and cruelty, passed the Ohio General Assembly and was signed into law by Ohio governor John Kasich; Goddard publicly advocated for animal welfare throughout his career and frequently spotlighted pets at animal shelters that needed adoption during his weather forecasts. WJW's weather center was renamed for Goddard upon his retirement, as was the street facing the station's current studios. His 51-year tenure at the station (including the interregnum between his contract signing and on-air debut) has been recognized as a Guinness World Record.

In 1973, Goddard started the Woollybear Festival, a day-long festival and parade in Birmingham, Ohio, devoted to the woolly bear caterpillar and traditional weather folklore. The festival grew in size and eventually overwhelmed the town by the early 1980s, when it moved to Vermilion, which hosts up to 100,000 in attendance every year. WJW continues to be the title sponsor for the Woollybear Festival into the present day.

== Hoolihan, Big Chuck and Lil' John ==
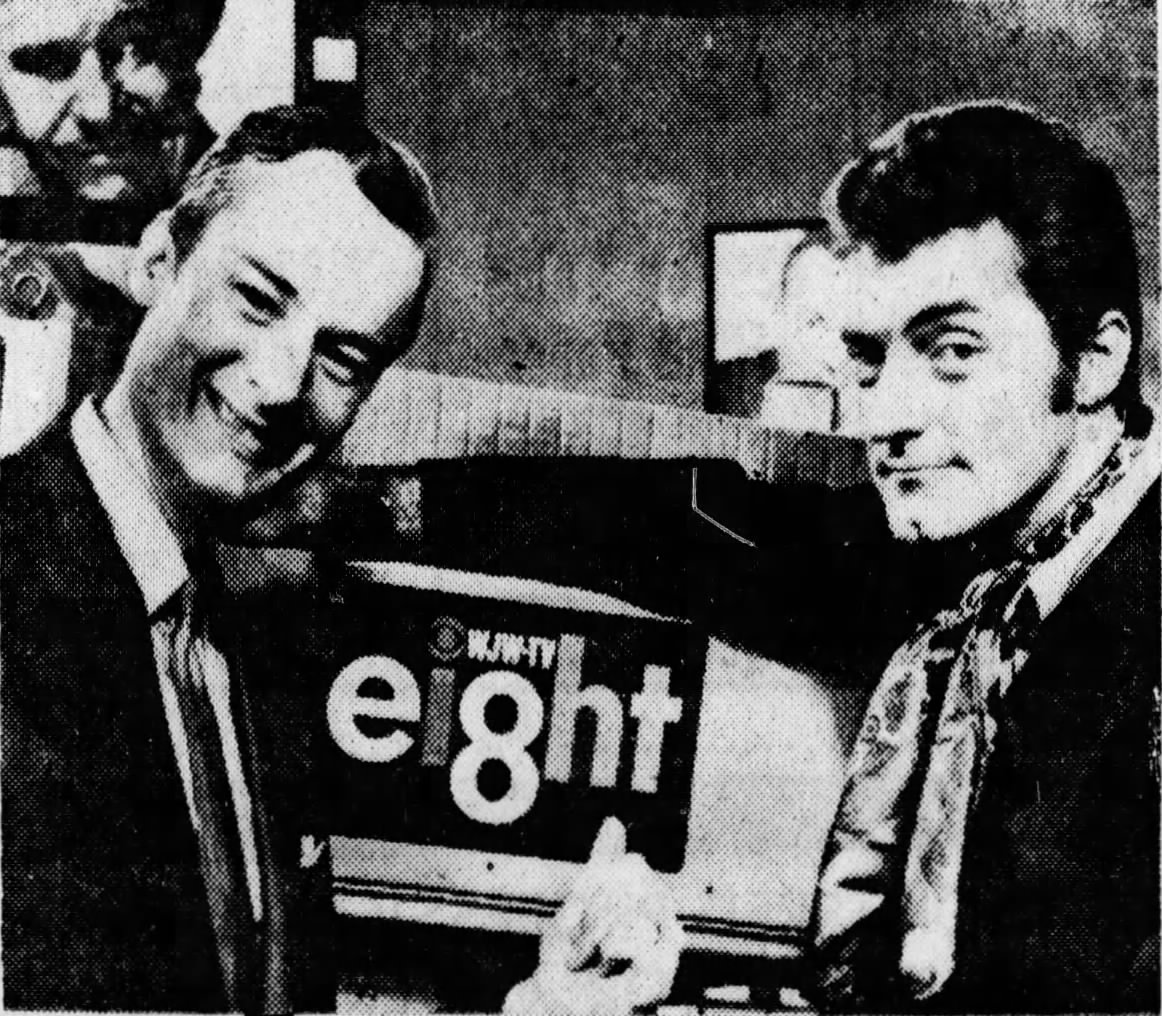
Bob "Hoolihan" Wells and "Big Chuck" Schodowski

After Ernie Anderson's resignation from the station, channel 8 conducted an open audition for the Friday night horror host role. Bob Wells, known as "Hoolihan the Weatherman", tried out for the role with Charles Schodowski's involvement; management paired them as a team to be Ghoulardi's successors, Hoolihan and Big Chuck, in December 1966. Schodowski, who was convinced the pairing was a mistake, gradually overcame significant stage fright while working opposite the more polished Wells. By 1975, Wells referred to Hoolihan and Big Chuck as "... basically Chuck's show".

Originally retaining the prior show's format of lighting off fireworks, comedy skits and mock music videos to novelty songs, the duo began focusing on comedy slapstick. Skits were almost always punctuated with a laugh track supplied by Jay Lawrence, which became so identified with the show that viewers treated it as a prompt for them to laugh. The show had multiple time slot changes: originally on Friday late nights, it was moved to Saturday afternoons, then back to Friday, then to late afternoons when CBS launched The Merv Griffin Show in late night. After WJW moved Merv Griffin to late afternoons—being one of several CBS affiliates to do so—Wells and Schodowski were moved back to Friday nights. Wells became a born-again Christian in 1976 and joined WSUM—an area Christian radio station—as general manager but downplayed his involvement as a horror host, telling the Plain Dealer, "[t]he TV program is intended to be entertainment ... I don't believe having fun is anti-Christian."

Wells left the show in August 1979 to become program director and talk show host at WCLF, an upstart Christian TV station in Clearwater, Florida. Schodowski selected "Lil' John" Rinaldi, involved with the show since 1972 in skits and known for his short stature, as Wells's successor. Relaunched on September 2, 1979, as Big Chuck and Lil' John, the program aired on channel 8 for another 28 years until Schodowski's 2007 retirement, best remembered for the duo's working-class sensibilities and relatable, low-budget humor likened to burlesque. Since 2011, the station has aired half-hour Big Chuck and Lil' John skit compilations shows on the weekends.

== Ratings success and stability ==
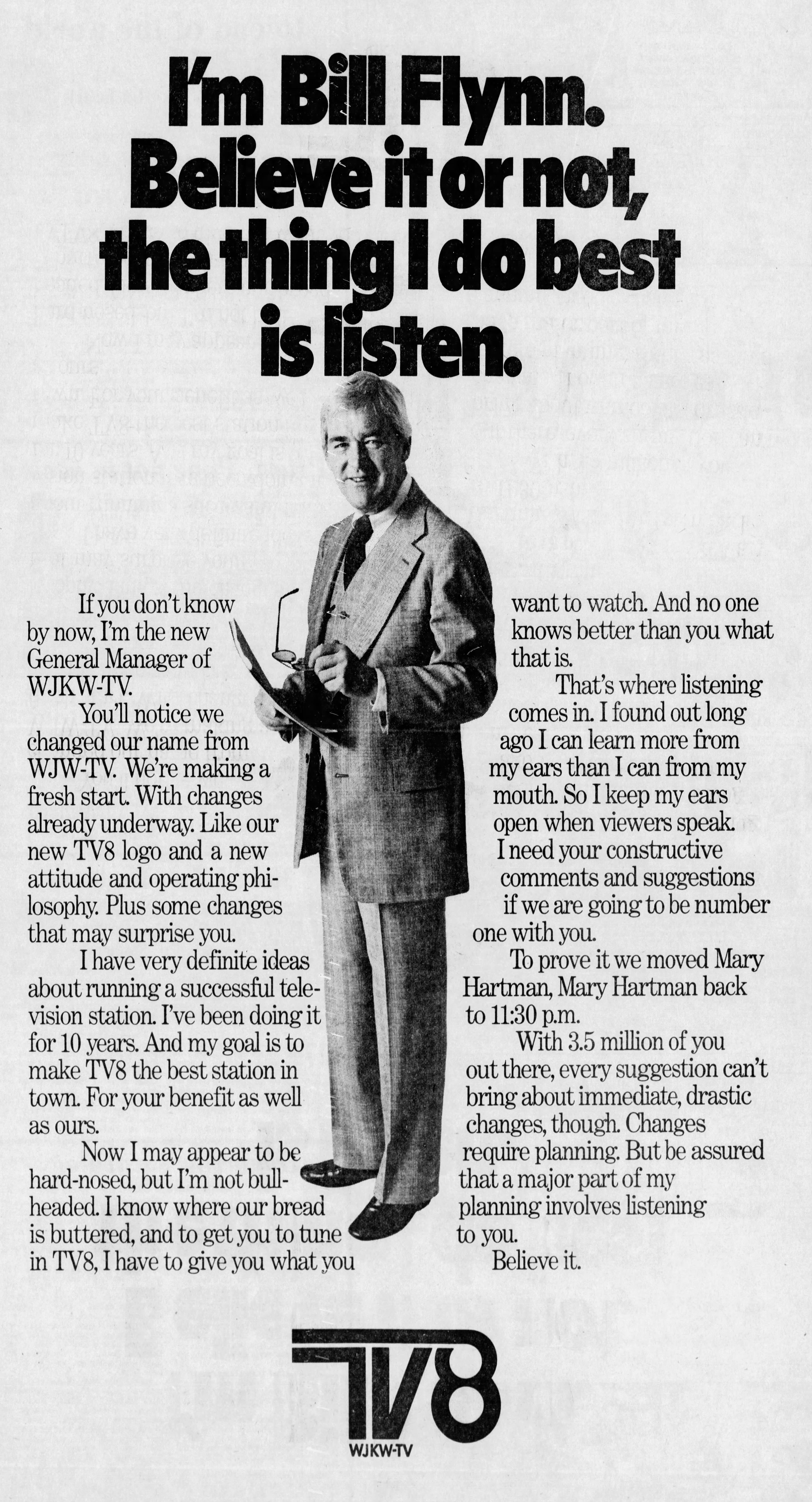
Full-page newspaper ad in April 1977 featuring WJKW general manager William Flynn

William Flynn took over as general manager for channel 8 in January 1977, having previously led WSBK-TV, Storer's independent in Boston. His arrival came as WJW-TV's call sign changed to WJKW-TV on April 22, 1977; this followed the sale of WJW radio to an Art Modell-headed syndicate, which retained usage of the WJW calls. One of Flynn's first changes was moving the soap opera spoof Mary Hartman, Mary Hartman from late nights to 7:30 p.m.; the move was extensively criticized and reversed in one month, and the station took out a full-page newspaper advertisement featuring Flynn. The controversy led to Hoolihan and Big Chuck spoofing Mary Hartman with a series of "Mary Hartski, Mary Hartski" skits, which Flynn encouraged. WJKW lost the Cleveland Indians and Cavaliers to WUAB in 1980; Flynn objected to sharing the Indians broadcast rights with a proposed cable outlet, while the Cavs games had declining ratings. Flynn was later regarded as a "swashbuckler" and described by Schodowski as "... really brash, devil-may-care, a good drinker, and very much like Ernie Anderson. He had that much an impact."

Flynn's first major personnel move was hiring former WKYC anchor Virgil Dominic as news director in March 1977. Dominic came from WXIA-TV in Atlanta, where he had also been news director. Addressing the station's last-place ratings against WEWS and WKYC, Dominic removed Hale and Maynor from anchor duty and declined to renew their contracts. Judd Hambrick, brother of onetime WEWS anchor John Hambrick, was hired as the new lead anchor, a move that led WJKW to distinguish between the brothers. WEWS reporter Tim Taylor was hired as WJKW's consumer reporter; by 1979, Taylor became co-anchor alongside Hambrick. The station became affiliated with Call For Action in early 1978 and established an investigation unit with "Fact Finder" Tom Meyer and "I-Team" reporter Carl Monday. Dick Goddard hosted a local version of Bowling for Dollars from 1977 to 1978, which was replaced by the local version of PM Magazine in 1979, with Jim Finnerty as co-host. Neil Zurcher, a channel 8 feature reporter since 1967, reported on close-to-home travel destinations in the wake of the 1979 energy crisis; his "One Tank Trip" segments proved popular and ran continuously until 2004.

Hambrick left WJKW in November 1981, initially to start a production company for a syndicated newsmagazine but subsequently became WKYC's lead anchor. His replacement was Tana Carli, a former Miss Ohio who joined the station as a reporter in June 1980. The male-female anchor pairing of Taylor and Carli was the first of its kind in Cleveland and signaled an eventual industry standard. Carli left WJKW in December 1983 to be with husband Joseph Diminio, who took over for Flynn as general manager and, after their high-profile marriage, was promoted to lead Storer's television division in Miami. Noon anchor Denise D'Ascenzo succeeded Carli as 1984 began; D'Ascenzo's visibility increased when she crossed the picket line during a WJKW technician strike in May 1983 that most on-air staff, including Carli, honored. Casey Coleman, the son of Ken Coleman, joined WJKW in 1982 and became weeknight sportscaster at year's end; from 1982 to 1985, Coleman split the duties with John Telich, who replaced Jim Mueller in the role one year earlier.

The station had the WJW-TV call sign restored on September 16, 1985, after WJW radio was sold again and became WRMR. Storer made the change out of sentimentality; even after having the WJKW calls for eight years, the station was still frequently referred to by viewers as "WJW". One month later, WJW-TV expanded its 6 p.m. news to an hour, moving the CBS Evening News to 7 p.m. and coinciding with talent revamps for PM Magazine. Assisted with The Phil Donahue Show as a lead-in, WJW's 6 p.m. news overtook WEWS for the top rating in early 1988, matching that station's top-rated 11 p.m. news. A further revamp of PM paired Jan Jones with musician Michael Stanley: despite increased ratings, PM was moved to weekends in the fall of 1988, then back to weeknights in January 1990 and renamed Cleveland Tonight that fall. PM was credited with helping transition Stanley to a career as a media personality. WJW also began simulcasting their 6 p.m. news on WHK in June 1990.

It was a family atmosphere. Tim Taylor was a great mentor to me. Casey [Coleman] and I hit it off immediately. We loved Robin [Swoboda] from the get-go, she was so much fun. [Dick] Goddard would get us food in between shows and we'd tease him about his idiosyncrasies. But it was all in good fun.

— John Telich, WJW sports reporter

D'Ascenzo left the station in March 1986 for a job at WFSB in Hartford, Connecticut. Robin Swoboda was hired from WTVJ in Miami as her replacement; Swoboda anchored WTVJ's noon news—under the name Robin Cole—directly opposite Carli at WPLG. WJW management recommended Swoboda use her real last name, feeling it would play well with Cleveland's ethnic community. The on-air team of Taylor, Swoboda, Goddard and Coleman met with significant ratings success: by June 1988, WJW was ranked number one at noon, 6 and 11 p.m., and the 11 p.m. news was the top-rated program in all of Cleveland television. Local media later described the four as "one of Cleveland's most memorable news teams" and "the Mount Rushmore of Cleveland TV news". Swoboda was offered a lucrative contract in 1988 to anchor in San Diego and co-hosted the pilot of a syndicated show alongside Ahmad Rashad, but she opted to remain in Cleveland. Marrying former Browns punter Bryan Wagner, Swoboda left WJW in June 1991 to co-host the NBC show Cover to Cover with Gayle King. Morning anchor Denise Dufala took over for Swoboda and was highly regarded for a friendly, yet serious, on-air demeanor and strong community ties, while ratings for both 6 and 11 p.m. saw year-to-year increases.

WJW logo c. 1989, with the "Cleveland's Own" slogan

WJW adopted the slogan "Cleveland's Own" in 1989, owing to the station's ratings dominance and homegrown talent, along with increased civic pride among local media; the moniker was derided in some circles for the station's out-of-town ownership. Aside from a brief de-emphasizing in early 1996, the station has continued to use the slogan into the present day.

== Ownership instability ==
=== KKR buyout and attempted sale to Lorimar ===
Storer Communications was taken private in a $1.6 billion leveraged buyout (equivalent to $4.79 billion in 2025) by Kohlberg Kravis Roberts (KKR), a merchant banker. Completed in December 1985, the buyout was engineered to thwart a hostile takeover by Comcast and an attempted liquidation of the company by dissatisfied shareholders. KKR purchased Wometco Enterprises the previous year after no succession plan was found following the death of chairman Mitchell Wolfson, and began the process of dismantling the conglomerate. Wometco already owned several television stations in markets where Storer owned cable systems, including WTVJ in Miami, and owned a cable system in Atlanta where Storer owned WAGA-TV; the FCC's approval was conditional on KKR divesting in these overlapping markets.

KKR originally planned to only sell WTVJ but soon entertained offers for some of the Storer stations. On May 21, 1986, Lorimar-Telepictures, producer of Dallas, Knots Landing and Falcon Crest for CBS, agreed to purchase the Storer stations, production company, advertising sales division, Washington news bureau and WTVJ for $1.85 billion (equivalent to $5.43 billion in 2025), with WTVJ commanding $405 million. Lorimar was expected to dismiss Storer's corporate staff, prompting Virgil Dominic—by then WJW station manager and Storer's corporate news director—to be transferred back to WJW as news director. This deal collapsed by late October 1986 when Lorimar asked to have WTVJ excluded. Initially attributed to issues financing the deal and reduced cash flow estimates for WTVJ, it was later revealed that CBS president Laurence Tisch objected to Lorimar purchasing a significant portion of the affiliate base and threatened to disaffiliate all the CBS affiliates in the deal, including WJW. WTVJ was put up for sale separately by KKR and sold to NBC on January 16, 1987.

=== George Gillett ownership, debt trouble, and sale rumors ===
We went from being owned by this family company to being owned by a conglomerate when George Gillette's [sic] company bought the Storer stations. [Gillett] came in for the dog and pony show and was very candid with us; he promised to support us, and when one of the employees asked a question he couldn't answer, he would do a tap dance. He was very dynamic.

— Kevin Salyer

In 1987, George N. Gillett Jr. acquired majority control of the Storer stations; the $1.3 billion deal (equivalent to $3.68 billion in 2025) was financed through junk bonds and represented a valuation of nearly 15 times cash flow for the group. KKR maintained 45-percent minority ownership. To satisfy federal regulations, Gillett's existing station group was spun off to Busse Broadcasting, a company formed by Gillett employees. Gillett was a major backer of local news production, to the point he called himself a "news junkie", but declined to commit to a larger budget for the station. Shortly after the takeover, WJW debuted an hour-long morning newscast in February 1988 that included Dufala, sportscaster Dan Coughlin and meteorologist André Bernier, the latter arriving from KARE in Minneapolis–Saint Paul. The newscast was seen as complementary to CBS This Morning.

Gillett's purchase of the Storer stations, renamed SCI Television, (Note: The subsidiary that held WJW's license was renamed Gillett Communications of Cleveland, Inc.) was troubled from the start. The junk bonds were raised prior to Black Monday: by November 1987, Gillett recorded a 10:1 debt-to-profit ratio and faced a $153 million loan payment by October 1989. Rumors started to emerge of Gillett selling WJW, along with his stations in Rochester, New York, and Nashville. These rumors intensified by June 1988 when Gillett, who formerly had a role with the Miami Dolphins, expressed interest in buying the Seattle Seahawks. Potential buyers included CBS, Group W, a consortium of station employees, Meredith Broadcasting, and former WUAB executive William Schwartz. While ownership denied WJW was itself up for sale, they did accept buy bids for review. WJW reportedly had an asking price of $190 or $200 million, which market analysts saw as a discount given Cleveland's market size and the station's ratings performance but also reflected the high price paid for the group. At the same time, Dominic was promoted to president and general manager, replacing C. David Whitaker, who transferred to Gillett's Tampa station, WTVT.

By June 1989, WJW was officially taken off the market, reportedly due to WJW's ratings and a separate deal to sell his Baltimore station, WMAR-TV, falling through. Gillett's Nashville station WSMV-TV was sold earlier in the year. Gillett boasted that the sale of WSMV was enough to shore up the company's financials, but the firm missed the October 1989 loan payment, prompting three creditors to ask the United States Bankruptcy Court in Delaware that SCI Television be placed in involuntary Chapter 7 bankruptcy while SCI offered a debt for equity exchange. This exchange offer was agreed to within hours of a deadline placed by the Delaware court. Bondholders acquired a 39-percent stake in SCI, while Gillett saw his ownership reduced to 41 percent and KKR's reduced to 15 percent; KKR also cancelled a $190 million debit note held on SCI. Gillett failed to meet a debt payment by August 1990, prompting S&P Global Ratings to lower the rating for Gillett Holdings from a C to a D.

WJW continued to be a standout for SCI, which was noteworthy given decreased investment in equipment and maintenance. By September 1991, the station cancelled Cleveland Tonight and laid off all personnel involved, effectively disbanding WJW's local production department; the move was blamed on both Gillett's financial woes and the departure of Swoboda, who took on additional duties with the show before leaving. Swoboda's exit also rendered a $75,000 promotional campaign the station shot on film earlier in the year worthless.

=== Bankruptcy and takeover by Ronald Perelman ===
WJW was again placed for sale in September 1990 after a second sale attempt for WMAR, but no offer materialized. WNET president William F. Baker expressed interest in WJW, having offered to buy WKYC from NBC the year before, and the president of Viacom paid a visit to WJW's studios. Gillett's financial pressures continued to mount after the WMAR sale was renegotiated to a lower price and a Denver bankruptcy judge denied any further extensions on a Chapter 11 filing. The early 1990s recession also negatively impacted television station cash flow and advertising revenue, on top of Gillett's failure to divest assets prior to a decline in station valuation. Facing lawsuits from multiple creditors including Apollo Partners, Allstate and Fidelity Investments, Gillett Holdings filed for Chapter 11 on July 26, 1991. After reaching another agreement with bondholders, Gillett Holdings was restructured in January 1992, with Gillett as a minority owner but maintaining day-to-day operational control.

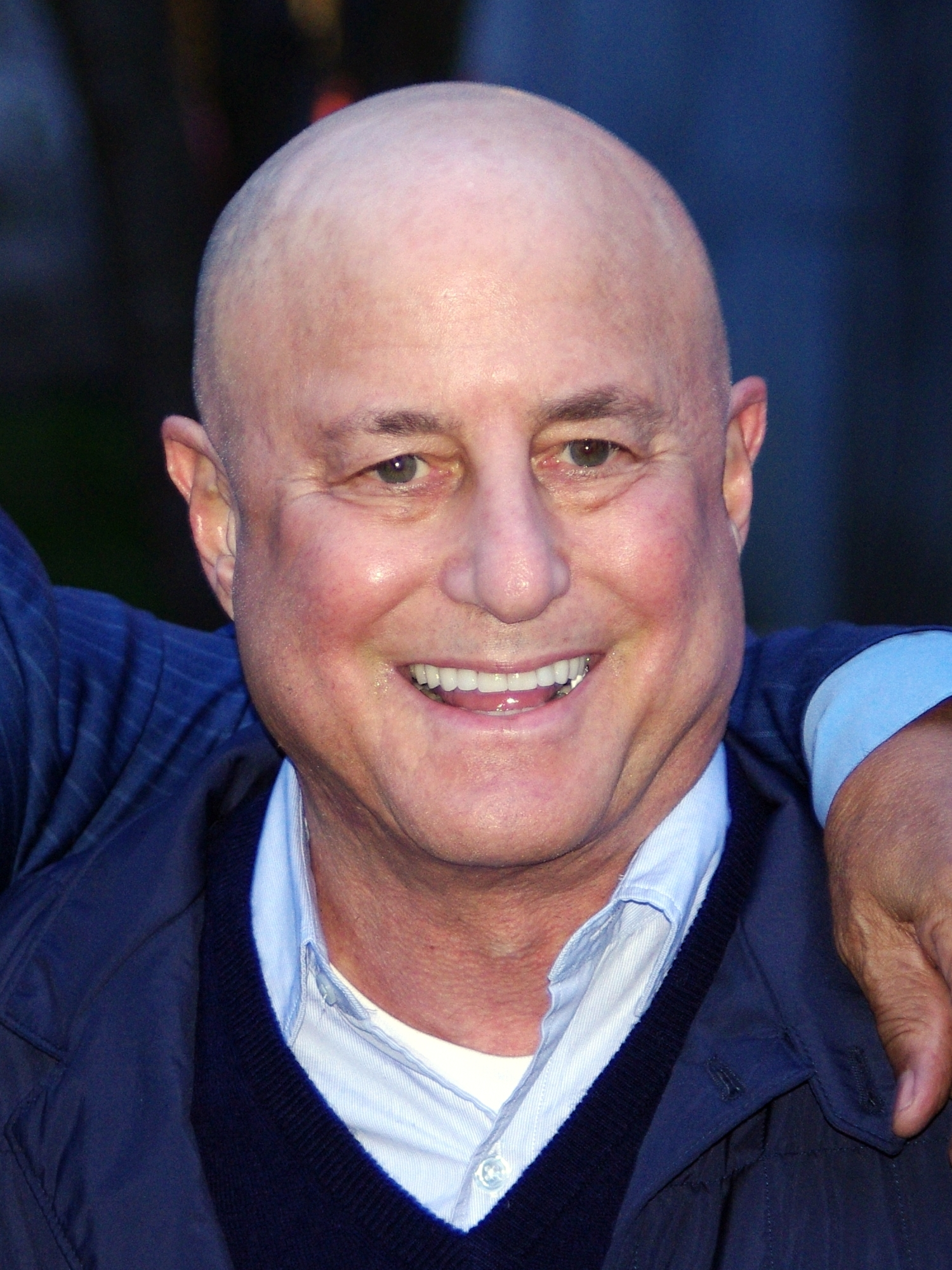
Ronald Perelman

Investor Ronald Perelman, regarded as a corporate raider and the owner of Revlon and Marvel Entertainment, purchased majority control of SCI Television, including WJW-TV, on February 17, 1993, pushing Gillett out entirely. The transaction came through a bankruptcy court-approved Chapter 11 reorganization: Perelman's holding company MacAndrews & Forbes made a $100 million investment in SCI, which was still burdened by $1.3 billion in debt, in exchange for 53 percent of its equity. WTVT was also included. After the deal closed, SCI was folded into Perelman's New World Entertainment and renamed New World Communications. This was one of several deals Perelman made in rapid succession, as he then purchased a stake in Genesis Entertainment via Four Star Television and directly purchased infomercial producer Guthy-Renker.

Perelman's takeover of SCI set off speculation regarding the station group's future with CBS, including using them to test future syndicated programming or to form a new network. The previous June, CBS announced a change in compensation for affiliates, owing to a $200 million financial shortfall for the network: affiliates, including WJW, were now being asked to repay as much as 25 percent of the money provided by CBS and also had to pay CBS in order to air specific programs. This came as WJW was already facing "several hundred thousand dollars" in decreased revenue. Dominic continued to reiterate support for CBS, saying, "[t]hey are the only network whose only business is the business of broadcasting" and "I think the country would suffer greatly if the network-affiliate system ever goes away". When CBS debuted Late Show with David Letterman in August 1993, WJW delayed the show until midnight in favor of Murphy Brown reruns, which netted more revenue from local advertising.

[B]uilding something from the ground up is more fun. The challenge is to take the people we had at 5 and blending them here at 8, with people like [Dick] Goddard, Carl Monday, Tom Meyer, Neil Zurcher—I have all these wonderful weapons at my disposal.

— Andy Fishman, former WEWS producer, on joining WJW

With newfound resources under New World, WJW made a flurry of talent hires, including producer Andy Fishman, entertainment reporter David Moss, and anchor/reporter Lou Maglio, all of whom came to WJW from WEWS. WEWS lead anchor Wilma Smith—who had been with the station for 17 years and was regarded as a "focal point"—inked a five-year deal with WJW on December 20, 1993, that included co-anchoring the 11 p.m. news and a revamped 5 p.m. news in the mold of WEWS's Live on Five, which Smith co-anchored and which continually bested WJW in the ratings. Negotiations between Smith and Dominic began in secret after WEWS failed to meet a right of first refusal deadline. Smith debuted at the station on April 3, 1994, after a non-compete clause with WEWS was honored, and said of Dominic, "... coming here with Virgil is like a dream come true. He knows what we go through, the insecurities—so understanding, someone I've always admired."

== New World and the switch to Fox ==
I guarantee you one thing. We are not going to be 'Fox 8.' There is no way in the world we are going to become 'Fox 8'. We are 'Cleveland's Own' and 'Newscenter 8,' and we intend to stay that way.

— Virgil Dominic, WJW president and general manager

On May 23, 1994, Fox parent News Corporation announced the purchase of a 20 percent stake in New World Communications, an investment of $500 million (equivalent to $1.09 billion in 2025). The deal included a groupwide multi-year affiliation agreement that had the majority of stations owned by—or in the process of being acquired by—New World, switch network affiliations to Fox after existing contracts expired per-station. News Corp. chairman Rupert Murdoch called the agreement "the largest network affiliation realignment in television history" and said it would "forever change the competitive landscape of network television". WJW's inclusion in the deal meant that their CBS affiliation would end after 39 years. This came after Fox outbid CBS for broadcast rights to the National Football Conference months earlier and sought to upgrade its affiliate base. Dominic was notified of the deal days in advance and sworn to secrecy; he later told the Plain Dealer, "My mouth fell to my knees. There was five or six seconds of absolute silence after [New World stations president Bob Selwyn] told me. It really was a shock."

WJW logo used from 1994 to 1995 during the affiliation switch, eschewing their Fox affiliation.

WJW was the first of these stations to switch to Fox on September 3, 1994, with outgoing Fox affiliate WOIO joining CBS; Fox Kids went from WOIO to WBNX-TV. With the switch, WJW-TV hired multiple personnel and added a local morning show, giving it the largest news staff and news output of any Ohio television station. The station, however, avoided marketing and branding with Fox, which Dominic publicly resisted implementing. WOIO had no news department but assumed operational control of WUAB to establish one; Dufala, who already had been replaced by Smith as WJW's 11 p.m. co-anchor, signed a contract with WOIO, while WJW re-signed Swoboda to co-anchor the 6 p.m. news. WJW's switch came with three months' notice and altered more than 20 hours of programming per day, or 87 percent of the schedule. Newscast ratings declined in all time slots, but it was especially pronounced for the late-evening news, a timeslot channel 8 consistently won since 1981. After moving from 11 p.m. to 10 p.m., WJW's late news still topped WUAB's newscast, but ratings fell by half overall. WJW's morning show also failed to retain the audience of its lead-in 6 a.m. news.

Dominic retired in May 1995: while highly regarded for his "avuncular" stewardship of WJW, the station struggled to maintain its prior news presentation more befitting of a CBS affiliation, a problem encountered by the rest of the New World stations. Selwyn later said WJW "had the farthest to fall" because it had been so closely tied to CBS. Fox Entertainment president John Matoian said the network was looking at broadening their programming beyond their original target 18–34 demographic, prompted largely by the reluctance of newer affiliates like WJW to identify with Fox. Dominic was replaced by Bob Rowe; under Rowe, previously the general manager of KNXV-TV in Phoenix, the station rebranded in November 1995 to "Fox is Ei8ht" / "Ei8ht is News", a slogan derided among viewers for its continuous on-air repetition. The morning newscasts were retooled into a three-hour program which saw its audience double year-over-year during the first month, while WJW saw ratings increases in several dayparts.

== Fox ownership ==
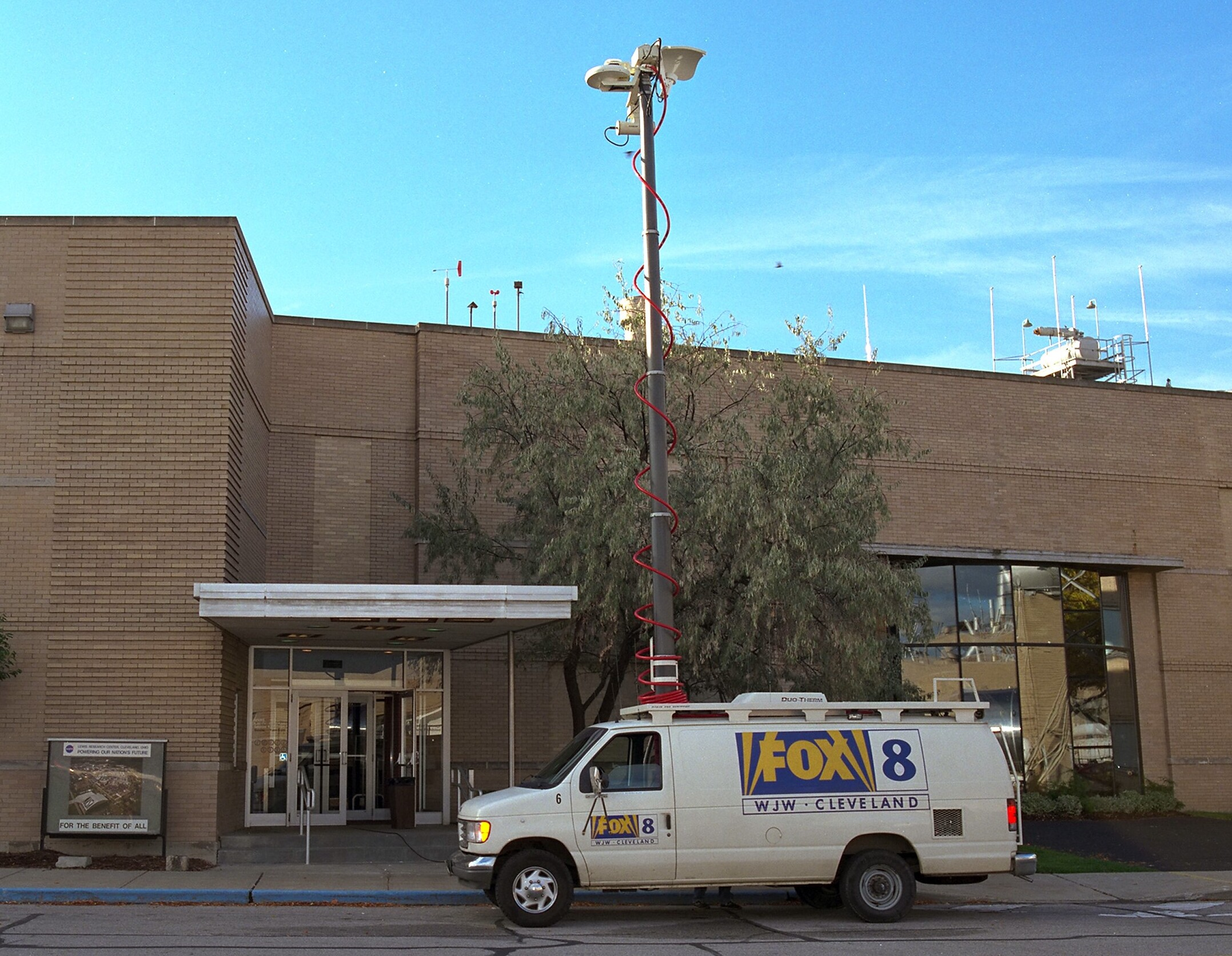
A WJW electronic news gathering truck with "Fox 8" livery outside the entrance to the NASA Glenn Research Center, 1998.

News Corp. agreed to purchase New World Communications in a $2.5 billion deal (equivalent to $5.34 billion in 2025) announced on July 17, 1996, with WJW joining Fox's owned-station division; talks between the two companies stalled earlier in the year but restarted when Perelman pursued a deal for King World. Beginning in August 1996, WJW began rebranding from "Ei8ht is News" to "Fox 8" in preparation for the changeover, the same branding Dominic publicly resisted implementing two years earlier. The nature of the rebranding led some station employees to joke internally, "Fox Ei8ht Us".

The turnover extended over-the-air. Prior to the start of the November 1996 sweeps, Rowe demoted Casey Coleman from weeknight sportscasting duties in favor of Mark Schroeder; Coleman, who had also been the radio voice of the Browns from 1994 until their 1996 move to Baltimore, was criticized for his close friendship with Bill Belichick and had been perceived as "negative". News director Kathy Williams, who was reportedly upset over Coleman's demotion, left for like duties at WKYC several weeks later, with Rowe tabbing Greg Easterly, a former producer/director at KNXV, as her replacement. When the deal closed, Rowe was dismissed and replaced by Mike Renda, a former sales manager at WJW. Renda and Easterly made a partial reversal of Coleman's demotion, restoring him to the 6 p.m. news in early March 1997, but declined to renew his contract at the end of June. Coleman's replacement was Tony Rizzo, son of former Cleveland television personality Jack Reynolds and the sportscaster for John Lanigan's show at WMJI, whose on-air persona was seen as a stark contrast to Coleman's.

We have to reshape TV-8 because it's a Fox station now. You have a different platform to promote from for shows like Melrose Place and Party of Five.

— Mike Renda, WJW general manager

Robin Swoboda left WJW a second time in early January 1998, which she largely attributed to the station's handling of Coleman, saying, "[t]hat's one of the reasons I don't love this business anymore. Casey was Cleveland sports. It's not fair." Wilma Smith was consequently moved from the 5 p.m. news—which tied in the ratings against reruns on WUAB and had a poor lead-in with The Rosie O'Donnell Show—to 6 p.m. opposite Tim Taylor, matching their 10 p.m. pairing. While seen as "slumbering" against stiff competition from WKYC and WEWS, WJW consistently led at 10 p.m. and beat WUAB by a 2–1 margin during the February 1998 sweeps. Ratings improved at 6 a.m. and noon by 1999, and in 2000, WJW was ranked first sign-on to sign-off in multiple key demographics, with the 8 a.m. hour competitive against the network morning shows. Renda credited the stability under Fox ownership for much of the success, saying, "[f]or years we were operating with rubber bands and glue. Fox has given us capital—and we're working for a real broadcaster now." The station erected a new tower in 1999 for high-definition television; to alleviate residential concerns, WJW agreed to remove both the existing analog tower and the original 1949 self-supporting tower once the digital tower was activated. WJW began digital broadcasts in November 1999 on UHF channel 31.

WJW ranked as the highest-rated Fox affiliate in the country in February 2001, with the station leading in the 25–54 demographic in every newscast, aided by Fox's primetime lineup and the acquisition of Judge Judy as a lead-in for 5 p.m. The success in mornings came alongside increased viewership for morning news industry-wide, while the success at 6 and 10 p.m. was attributed to the stability of WJW's anchor team of Smith, Taylor and Goddard; as Taylor told The Plain Dealer, "people in Cleveland abhor change". By 2004, WJW faced heightened competition from WKYC, particularly at 5 a.m. and 6 p.m., and Dr. Phil on WKYC at 5 p.m. topped all competing newscasts. As 2005 began, Smith and Taylor reduced their schedule to anchor solely at 6 p.m. by their request, and Bill Martin and Stacey Bell took over anchoring at 10 p.m., reflecting WJW's dominance in the late-evening news while also raising the profiles of Martin and Bell. The change foreshadowed Taylor's retirement at the end of 2005, ending a 40-year career in broadcasting and 27 years at channel 8. Lou Maglio replaced Taylor as 6 p.m. co-anchor, a role he continues to hold.

In early 2007, the station launched That's Life, a local late-morning talk show hosted by Swoboda, who returned to WJW for her third stint; the show was inspired in part by WEWS's The Morning Exchange, which Swoboda briefly co-hosted in 1998. That's Life was also the first locally-produced program in the market to be broadcast in high-definition. By 2010, That's Life was renamed The Robin Swoboda Show.

== Local TV, Tribune and Nexstar ownership ==
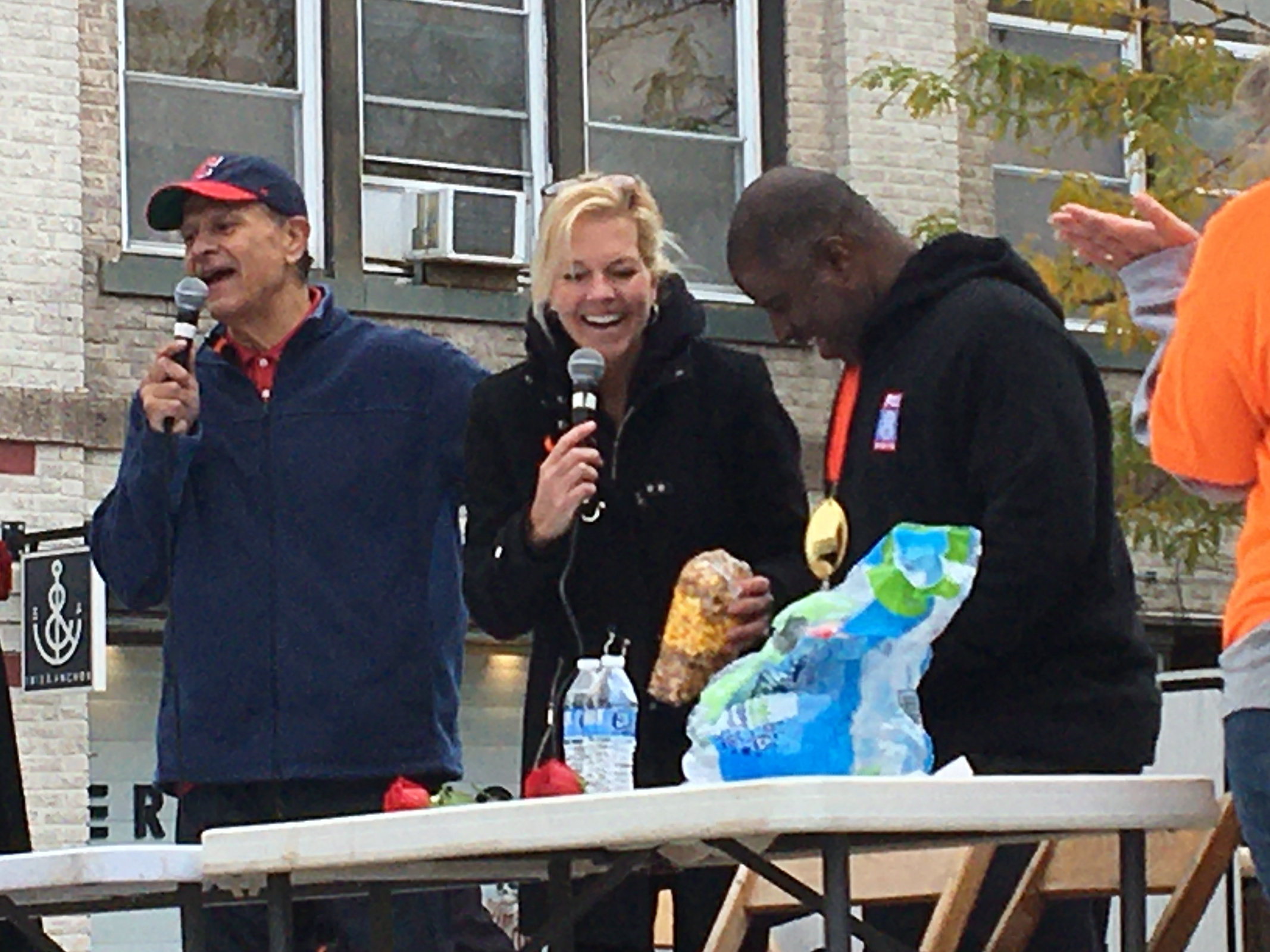
Weeknight anchors Lou Maglio and Tracy McCool, and meteorologist Dontae Jones

On December 22, 2007, Fox sold WJW and seven other stations to Local TV for $1.1 billion; the stations were divested so News Corp. could raise additional capital for its $5 billion purchase of Dow Jones & Company. The sale coincided with WJW debuting a news set, logo and graphics more closely tied to Fox News, and the station's website moved to Fox's "myfox" internet platform. Mike Renda was transferred to WTXF-TV, Fox's owned-and-operated station in Philadelphia, and Greg Easterly succeeded him as general manager. The sale was finalized on July 14, 2008; up to 25 staffers left the station prior to the sale's close, with some taking early retirement to access a benefits package provided by Fox, and the station's Columbus bureau was closed. Lead investigative reporter Tom Merriman left WJW to resume a career in legal work when one colleague in the station's "I-Team" unit was reassigned to consumer reporting and another was promoted to anchor duties.

During Local TV ownership, WJW's analog signal was shut down on June 12, 2009, as part of the transition from analog to digital television; the station's digital signal relocated from its pre-transition UHF channel 31 to VHF channel 8. Swoboda left the station in January 2011 after disagreeing over the inclusion of sponsored segments; The Robin Swoboda Show was replaced with New Day Cleveland, an infotainment program hosted by David Moss and Kristi Capel, and has remained on the lineup to the present day. The following year, Capel was promoted to morning co-anchor alongside Wayne Dawson, who joined channel 8 in 1979 and became lead morning anchor in 1999. Wilma Smith retired on May 22, 2013, ending a 36-year career in television, almost all of it working in the Cleveland market.

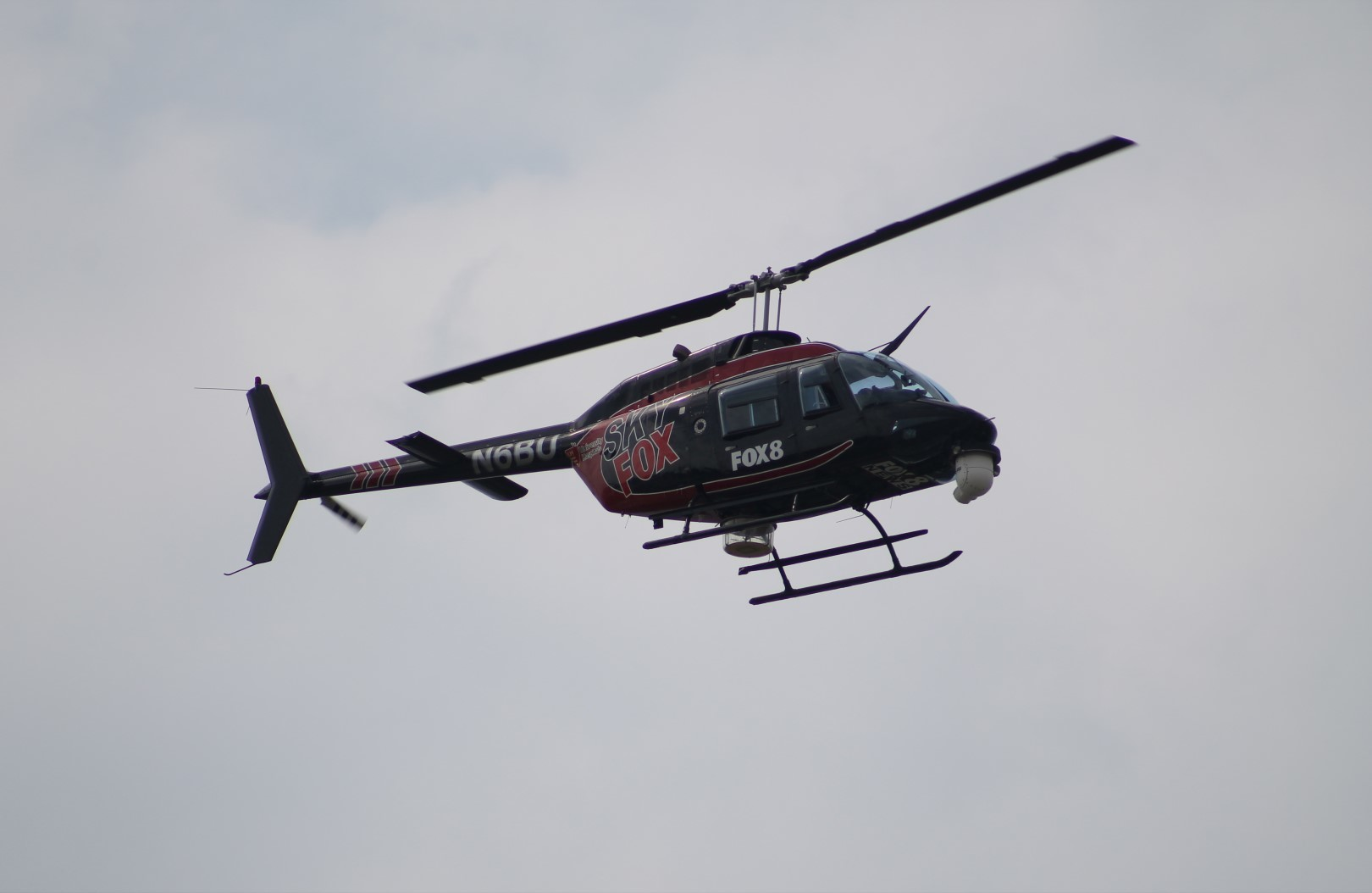
WJW's helicopter, "SkyFox"

Tribune Broadcasting acquired Local TV on July 1, 2013, for $2.75 billion. News expansion furthered under Local TV and Tribune, including weekend morning news in 2011 and a 4 p.m. newscast in 2013. In April 2014, Easterly was promoted to the general manager role at WGN-TV, Tribune's flagship station, while Andy Fishman was elevated that November to the role of news director, which he still holds. After being rescued from years of captivity by Ariel Castro in 2013, Amanda Berry joined WJW in 2017 to host regular missing person segments.

Sinclair Broadcast Group announced a $3.9 billion purchase of Tribune Broadcasting on May 8, 2017. The deal raised concerns over the future of WJW's newscasts due to Sinclair's track record of undermining editorial independence at the station level. Sinclair agreed to sell WJW back to Fox Television Stations as part of a seven-station, $910 million deal, contingent on the Sinclair-Tribune deal closing, but this was nullified when Tribune terminated the merger on August 9, 2018, following a rejection of the deal by FCC chairman Ajit Pai. Following the Sinclair-Tribune merger collapse, Tribune agreed to be purchased by Nexstar Media Group on December 3, 2018, for $6.4 billion. After the sale closed on September 16, 2019, Fox declined to reacquire WJW despite "high-stakes negotiations" between the two groups.

Nexstar subsequently purchased WBNX on October 28, 2024, for $22 million. The deal closed in February 2025, and WBNX became the Cleveland affiliate for The CW on September 1, 2025. (Note: WBNX was previously the Cleveland affiliate for The CW from 2006 until 2018.) WBNX also launched a live 11 p.m. newscast produced by WJW in addition to airing same-day repeats of New Day Cleveland in the early afternoon.

On August 19, 2025, Nexstar announced its purchase of Tegna Inc., owner of WKYC, for $6.2 billion. The deal was completed on March 19, 2026, after the FCC's Media Bureau waived restrictions prohibiting ownership of more than two full-power licenses in markets such as Cleveland. A temporary restraining order issued one week later by the U.S. District Court for the Eastern District of California, later escalated to a preliminary injunction, has prevented WKYC from being integrated into WJW and WBNX. Ohio Attorney General Dave Yost reached a deal with Nexstar on April 30, 2026, under which, if the injunction were to be lifted, Nexstar would maintain the existing local program output and editorially independent news departments between WJW and WKYC through 2030.

== Notable former on-air staff ==
- Mel Allen, Indians play-by-play, 1968
- Nina Blackwood, host of Electric Avenue, 1990
- Joe Castiglione, sportscaster, 1979–1981
- Vince Cellini, sportscaster, 1982–1989
- Rocky Colavito, Indians color analyst, 1972 and 1977
- Bob Franken, reporter, 1969–1978
- Alan Freed, announcer, 1950
- Frank Glieber, sportscaster, 1966–1968
- Mudcat Grant, Indians color analyst, 1973–1976
- Tony Harris, PM Magazine reporter/co-host, 1982–1987
- Allie LaForce, sportscaster, 2011–2012
- Warren Lahr, Browns color analyst, 1962–1967
- Dave Martin, sportscaster, 1969–1972
- Fred McLeod, sportscaster, 1976–1980
- Erin Moriarty, reporter, 1982–1983
- Robin Meade, anchor, 1993
- Kelly O'Donnell, anchor, 1986–1994
- Martin Savidge, anchor/reporter, 1984–1995
- Herb Score, Indians color analyst, 1964–1967

== Technical information and subchannels ==
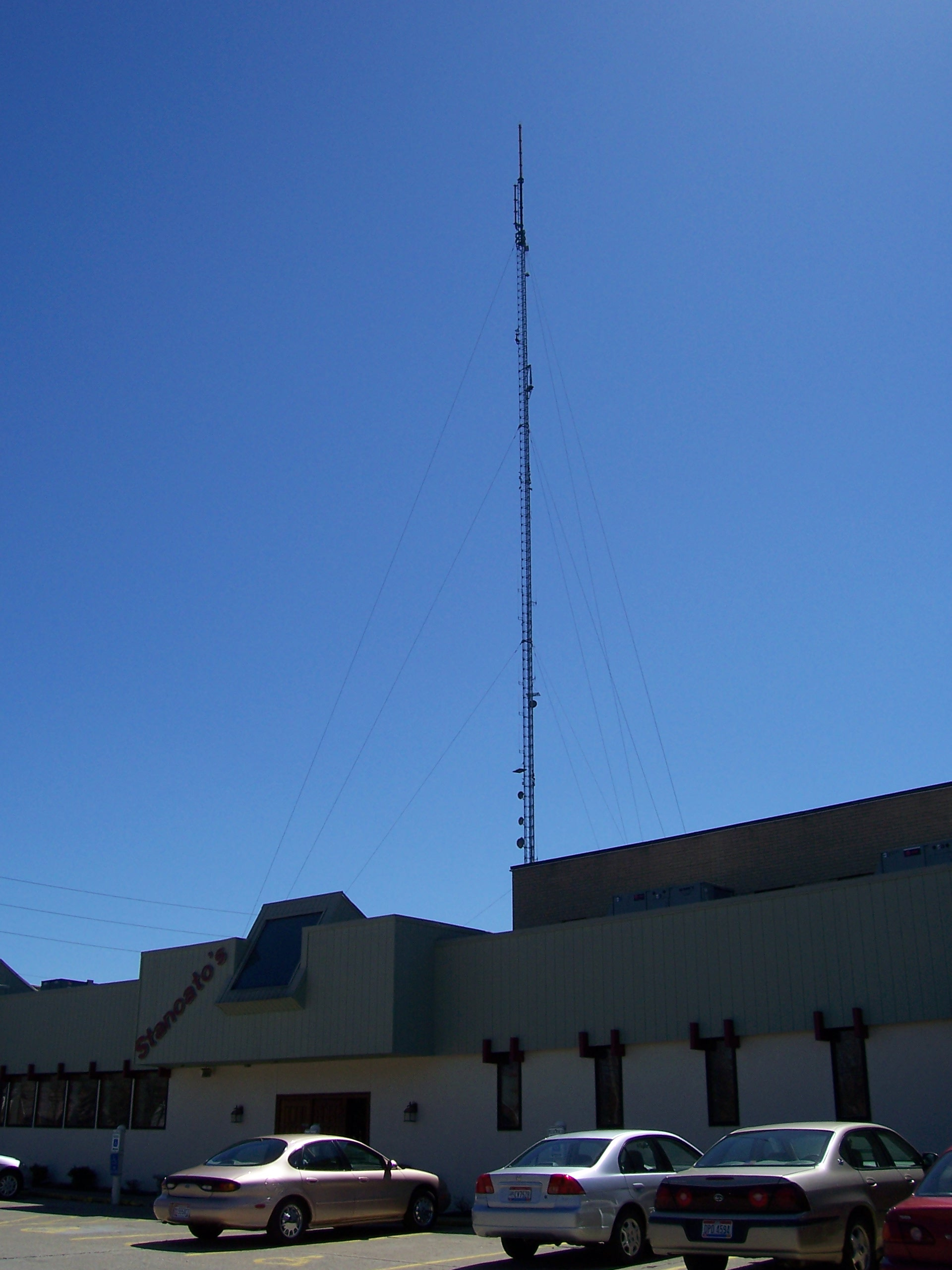
WJW's transmitter tower as seen from a nearby shopping plaza in Parma, Ohio.

WJW is broadcast from a transmitter located at the intersection of State Road (Ohio SR 94) and Pleasant Valley Road in Parma, Ohio. The station's signal is multiplexed:

Subchannels of WJW
| Subchannel | Res. | Short name | Programming |
|---|---|---|---|
| 8.1 | 720p | FOX | Fox |
| 8.2 | 480i | Antenna | Antenna TV |
| 8.3 | 480i | Comet | Comet |
| 8.4 | 480i | Charge | Charge! |
| 55.1 | 1080i | WBNX-HD | The CW (WBNX-TV) |

Broadcast on behalf of another station

=== ATSC 3.0 testing ===
WJW's initial digital transmitter on UHF channel 31 prior to the 2009 digital transition has remained in a functional, though dormant, state. Tribune Broadcasting donated the transmitter to the National Association of Broadcasters, which it used to conduct a six-month test of the ATSC 3.0 standard beginning in May 2015 as WI9X3Y. The transmitter remained active for the duration of the 2016 World Series—in which the Cleveland Indians played—and broadcast in 4K UHD with Dolby AC-4 audio.

== See also ==
- List of three-letter broadcast call signs in the United States
