= Buddy Esquire =

American graphic designer (1958–2014)

- Born: Lemoin Thompson; July 17, 1958; The Bronx, New York City, U.S.
- Died: January 31, 2014 (aged 55)
- Occupation: Graphic designer
- Movement: Hip-hop

Lemoin Thompson (July 17, 1958 – January 31, 2014), known by the name Buddy Esquire, was the most well-known show flyer artist in the Bronx in the early days of hip-hop, from 1978 to 1982. He was self-taught and learned drawing and typography principles from books at his local library. Graffiti, Japanese anime, superhero comics, and Art Deco architecture were among his influences. Grandmaster Flash, Afrika Bambaataa, Kool Herc, the Funky 4 Plus 1, and the Cold Crush Brothers were among the hip-hop legends whose early performances were advertised on his flyers. In the late 1970s and early 1980s, Buddy Esquire's visual styles helped to set the tone for hip-hop. His flyers are some of the only primary materials relating to the earliest developments of what is now the world's most popular music genre, aside from their striking graphic elements. Many of his work used jukeboxes and historic theater marquees as inspiration. His work featured sharp chiaroscuro shapes, as well as a playful tension between lettering, photographs, and decorations.

== Early life ==
Esquire was born in the Bronx, New York, and lived in the James Monroe Houses in Soundview, Bronx. In 1972, he began creating graffiti, tagging under the names, "ESQ" and "Phantom 1." Graffiti was an early practice in artistic development. He said, "I kept practicing and eventually I got better at handling letter form." His graffiti career ended in the early 1980s.

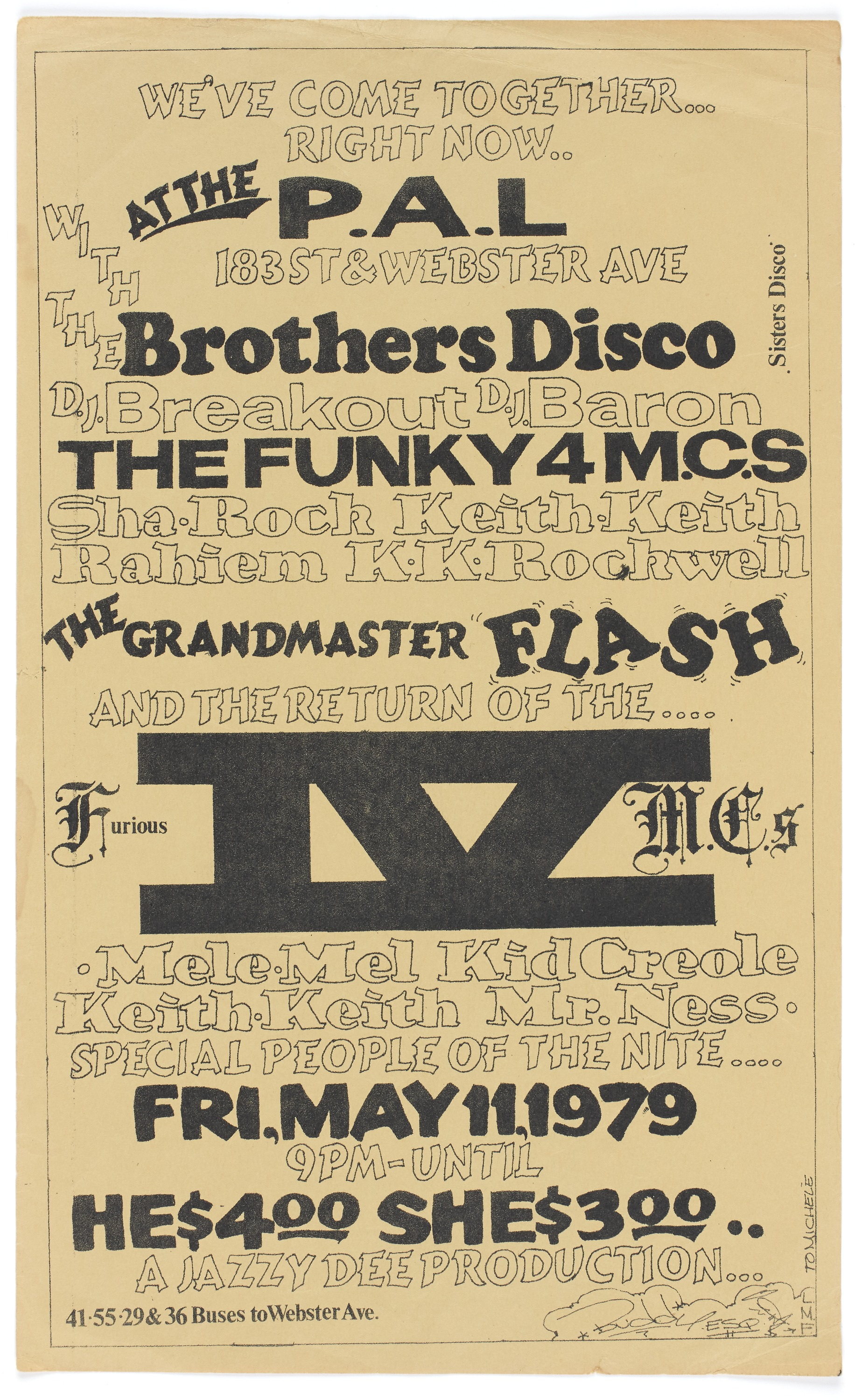
Flier for a 1979 rap battle in the Bronx designed by Buddy Esquire

== Design career ==
Buddy was an artist who taught himself. In 1977, Buddy began painting on people's garments, such as names on jeans. In the same year he start creating flyers, he created the first flyer for a neighborhood block party. He taught himself how to draft posters by following books from the public library.

He named his style, "Neo-deco." Esquire used Art Deco-inspired borders and deco dry-transfer typefaces from Letraset. Though graffiti was often associated with hip-hop at this time, Esquire wanted to create an identity for the shows that was not only legible, but professional and stylish. This visual style was in contrast to the settings of most live hip-hop events in the Bronx from the late 1970s and early 1980s: local high schools and community centers. "That's what I tried for, you know: give it a level of class even though it was just a ghetto jam," he said. He mentions his frequent use of the Broadway font family and its Art Deco antecedents. He was able to make exact and varied hand-drawn alphabets in 1978 and 1979, but he chose to start utilizing transferable lettering in 1980.

== Death and legacy ==
Buddy Esquire died in 2014 at the age of 55 by a kitchen accident. He succumbed to smoke inhalation. Though he made great contributions to design, he never made a living wage from his work. He worked for UPS most of his life. His funeral was attended by big names in early hip-hop: Afrika Bambaataa, Charlie Ahearn, and Theodore Livingston. Buddy Esquire's work is archived for Cornell University.

A book of his handbills was published by Sinecure Books in 2015, titled Buddy Esquire: King of the Hip Hop Flyer.
