= Tom Merriman (journalist) =

American lawyer and former journalist

Tom Merriman is an American lawyer and former investigative journalist in Cleveland, Ohio.

== Education ==
Merriman earned his Bachelor of Arts in economics from the University of Notre Dame in 1984. He earned his Juris Doctor from Harvard Law School in 1988.

== Investigative journalism career ==
Merriman was an investigative journalist in Cleveland for 14 years. He worked for WEWS-TV (News 5) from 1995 to 2001, then moved to WJW-TV (Fox 8) until 2008.

In 2001, following the September 11 attacks, he produced a series of reports investigating Cleveland Imam Fawaz Damrah, discovering the imam had ties to several of the bombers in the 1993 World Trade Center bombing and raised funds for terrorist organizations.

In 2002, he reported a story involving the United States military and prostitution in South Korea. Wearing a hidden camera, he walked into bars and brothels near Camp Casey, documenting U.S. military police protecting American soldiers who were paying for sex with trafficked women. The report led to Congressional hearings and an investigation by the Department of Defense Office of Inspector General.

Beginning in 2004, Merriman reported on fraud, waste and mismanagement in the Cleveland Municipal School District's transportation department under the leadership of CEO Barbara Byrd-Bennett, including inflated ridership figures, school buses being used to run personal errands, and an excessively large number of spare school bus drivers. The series, "School Bus Bloat," won a duPont-Columbia Silver Baton Award and the I.R.E. Medal from Investigative Reporters & Editors.

In 2006, he was profiled in a PBS documentary, "The Best of Broadcast Journalism."

In other stories, Merriman reported on EMS ambulances being tied up on "ridiculous calls" while patients in need had to wait, and donned a disguise to document treatment of the homeless by police and private security forces.

Merriman has won 38 Emmy Awards for his work in local news.

== Legal career ==
Merriman was managing attorney of the Ohio Attorney General's Cleveland office from 1991 to 1994.

After leaving WJW-TV, he went into private practice.

In 2011, he represented a family in Chagrin Falls who were forced to move from their home after it started to slide down the hill it was built on, tying it to construction on a condominium project below their property.

In 2018, he represented families who lost frozen eggs or embryos after a storage tank malfunctioned at University Hospitals Fertility Center.

In 2019, he represented a man who was badly burned after the vape device in his pocket exploded.

Also in 2019, he represented a man who was injured when a tow truck lifted the car he was in high into the air and flipped it into oncoming traffic on the highway.

In 2022, Merriman represented customers of Cleveland Public Power in a class-action lawsuit that claimed they had been routinely over-charged on their electric bills.

In 2009, Merriman made the news after displaying a "Fox 8 News" sign in his car to use media parking for a court appearance – despite the fact he was no longer a reporter. He took the incident in stride, noting he was "guilty as charged."

== Return to television ==
In 2019, Merriman returned to WJW-TV as a contributor, making occasional appearances to discuss legal issues. He has taken part in a regular feature on "New Day Cleveland" called "Case or Not a Case?" In the segment, Merriman presents a series of hypothetical scenarios, asking whether there is a potential personal injury case.
