= Paul LaRosa =

American television producer

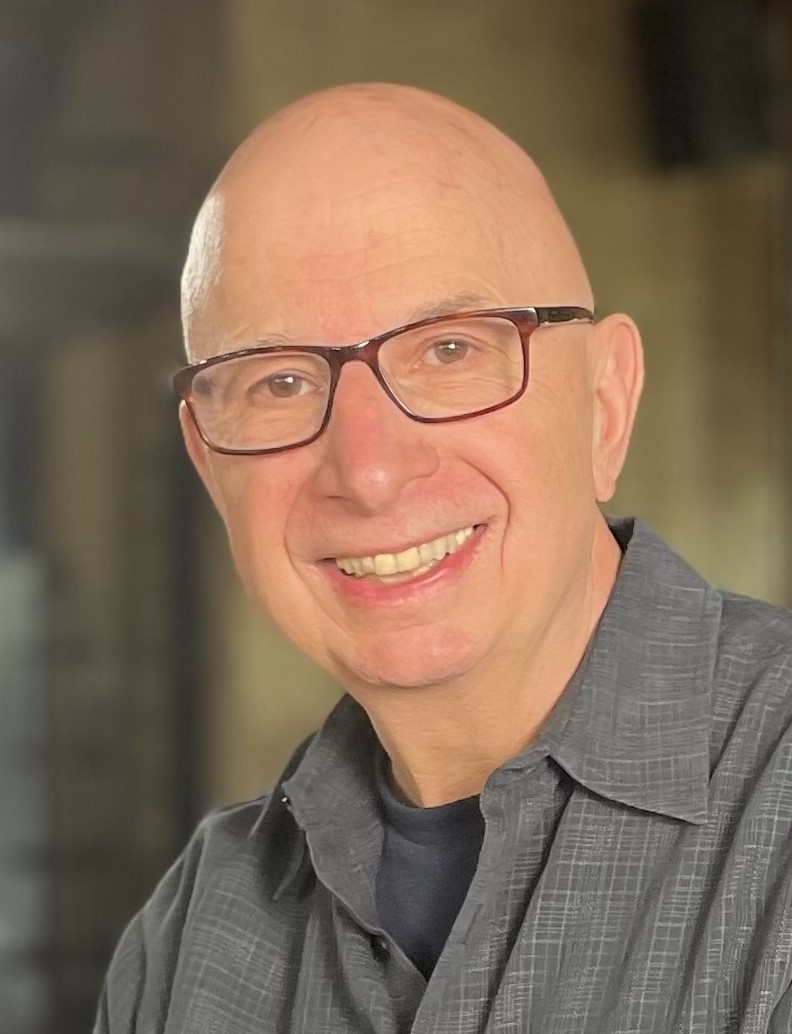

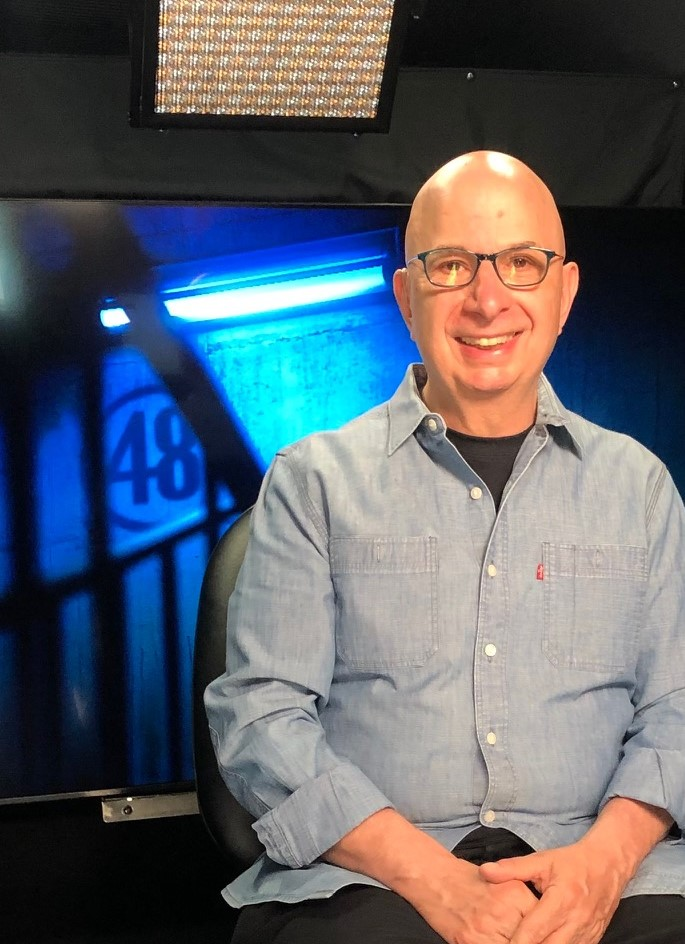
Paul LaRosa in 2021

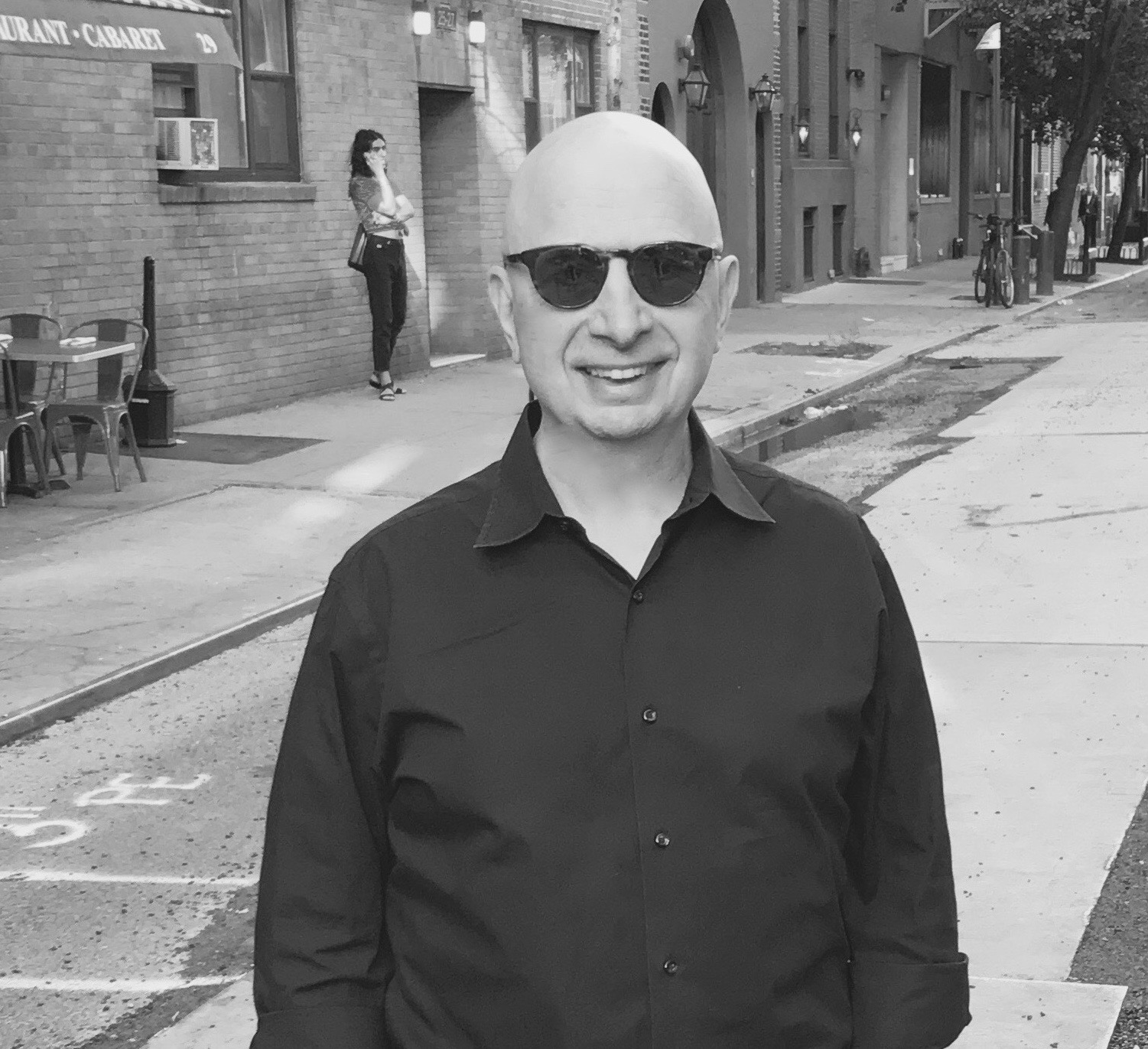
The author Paul La Rosa on Cornelia Street in New York City's Greenwich Village neighborhood in 2017

Paul La Rosa (born 1953) is an American journalist, author, and television news producer, best known for his award-winning work at CBS News’ 48 Hours and his reporting with The New York Daily News. Over a career spanning four decades, he has covered crime stories, produced documentaries, and written both nonfiction and fiction, often with a focus on true crime.

He has received Peabody Award, Christopher Award, Gracie Awards and Emmy Awards.

== Biography ==
La Rosa was born in East Harlem and raised in the James Monroe Houses, a public housing project located in the Soundview section of The Bronx. His first job was delivering the New York Daily News. He currently resides in Park Slope, Brooklyn.

Prior to Fordham he studied at Cardinal Hayes High School in the Bronx.

== Career ==
=== Print journalism ===
Following his graduation from Fordham University, LaRosa was employed at the Daily News from 1975 until 1990, starting out as a copy boy.

During the 1970s and 1980s, he covered a wide range of beats including crime, labor, and city government. His most prominent assignment was covering the 1980 murder of John Lennon outside The Dakota.

In 1983, he was awarded the Meyer Berger Award for Distinguished Reporting from the Columbia University Graduate School of Journalism, sharing the honor with The New York Times columnist Anna Quindlen. The following year, he received a Revson Fellowship for the Future of the City of New York, allowing him to spend a year at Columbia University studying urban affairs.

LaRosa remained at the Daily News until 1991.

=== Broadcast journalism ===
In 1992, La Rosa joined CBS News as a producer for 48 Hours, where he specialized in long-form investigative storytelling.

He was a producer for the 2002 documentary 9/11, which captured the experiences of New York City firefighters during the September 11 attacks. The program earned him multiple honors, including Peabody Award, Christopher Award, and an Edward R. Murrow Award.

He was nominated for Emmy Awards multiple times and has won four of them over his career. He also has received three Gracie Awards from the Alliance for Women in Media. In 2018, he won a New York Press Club Award in the Special Event category for A Nation Divided, a report featuring middle school students from immigrant families reflecting on the presidential inauguration of Donald Trump.

=== Writing ===
La Rosa is the author of several true-crime books, often based on cases he covered for television. His works include Tacoma Confidential: A True Story of Murder, Suicide, and a Police Chief’s Secret Life (2006), Nightmare in Napa (2007), Death of a Dream (2008, with Erin Moriarty), and Seven Days of Rage: The Deadly Crime Spree of the Craigslist Killer (2009, with Maria Cramer). His memoir, Leaving Story Avenue: My Journey from the Projects to the Front Page (2012).

== Personal life ==
La Rosa is married to Susan Glauberman La Rosa, former vice president of marketing and communications for the Henry Street Settlement. They have two grown children. A native New Yorker, he has lived in every borough except Staten Island.

== Books ==
- Leaving Story Avenue: My Journey From the Projects to the Front Page (2012, Park Slope Publishing)

=== True crime ===
- Seven Days of Rage: The Deadly Crime Spree of the Craigslist Killer – with Maria Cramer (2010, Pocket Star)
- Death of a Dream – with Erin Moriarty (2008, Pocket Star)
- Nightmare in Napa: The Wine Country Murders (2007, Pocket Star)
- Tacoma Confidential: A True Story of Murder, Suicide, and a Police Chief’s Secret Life (2006, Signet

Novels

– Get Back, Imagine Saving John Lennon by Donovan Day (pseudonym)

== Television ==
- 48 Hours Mystery – Producer – various episodes (1993 – current, CBS)
- Survivor – Producer – "Surviving Survivor" special – (2010, CBS)
- "All Access Grammy Special" – Producer (2009, CBS)
- "39 Days"—Producer (2018, CBS News)
