= List of United States Christmas television episodes =

This article is a list of Christmas episodes of regular United States television series.

== Celebrity-hosted variety shows ==
- Jack Benny
  - The Jack Benny Program
    - "Jack Does Christmas Shopping" (Season 5, Episode 6) (1954)
    - "Christmas Shopping Show" (Season 8, Episode 7) (1957)
    - "Christmas Gift Exchange" (Season 9, Episode 8) (1958)
    - "Christmas Show" (Season 11, Episode 9) (1960)
    - "Christmas Party" (Season 12, Episode 10) (1961)
- Perry Como
  - "Christmas in the Holy Land" (1980)
  - The Perry Como Show
    - "Christmas Special" (1955–1958)
  - The Perry Como Chesterfield Supper Club
    - "Christmas Special" (1948, 1949)
  - The Perry Como Chesterfield Show
    - "Christmas Special" (1950–1954)
  - Perry Como's Kraft Music Hall
    - "Christmas Special" (1959–1962, 1965, 1966)
    - "Perry Como's Christmas In Rome" (1964)
- Jackie Gleason
  - The Jackie Gleason Show
    - "Christmas Party" (Season 1, Episode 13) (1952)
    - "Santa and the Bookies" (Season 2, Episode 10) (1953)
    - "Christmas Party" (1953)
    - "Santa and the Bookies" (1954)
    - "The Poor Soul in Christmas-Land" (1956)
    - "Run, Santa, Run" (1966)
    - "The Poor Soul in Christmas-Land" (1966)
  - Cavalcade of Stars
    - Christmas Party (Season 3, Episode 17) (1951)
- Danny Kaye
  - The Danny Kaye Show
    - "Christmas Show" (1964)
    - "Christmas Show" (1965)
    - "Christmas Show" (1966)
- David Letterman
  - Late Night with David Letterman
    - Christmas with the Lettermans (Season 3 Episode 129) (December 19. 1984)
    - "Dave Letterman's Old-Fashioned Christmas" (Season 6 Episode 144) (December 25, 1987)
- Dean Martin
  - The Dean Martin Show
    - "Christmas with the Martins and Sinatras" (1967)
    - "Christmas Show" (December 19, 1968)
    - "Christmas Show" (1972)
    - "Dean Martin's California Christmas" (1975)
    - "Dean Martin's Christmas in California" (1977, 1979)
    - "Dean Martin Christmas Special" (1980)
    - "Dean Martin's Christmas at Sea World" (1981)
- The Osmonds
  - Donny & Marie
    - "Christmas Show" (1976–1978)
- Frank Sinatra
  - The Frank Sinatra Show (1950)
    - "Christmas Show" (1950)
  - The Frank Sinatra Show (1957)
    - "Happy Holidays with Bing and Frank" (1957)
- Red Skelton
  - The Red Skelton Show
    - "The Cop and the Anthem" (1955)
    - "Freddie and the Yuletide Doll" (1961, restaged 1962)
    - "The Plight Before Christmas" (1964, restaged 1965)
    - "Christmas Show" (1966)
    - "A Christmas Urchin" (1967)
    - "Christmas Show" (1970)
    - "Freddie the Freeloader's Christmas Dinner" (1981)
- Ed Sullivan
  - The Ed Sullivan Show
    - Topo Gigio:
- "Topo's Christmas List" (December 14, 1969)
- "Topo Writes Letter To Santa" (December 17, 1967)
- "Topo Dresses As Santa Claus" (December 23, 1963)
- The Muppets:
    - "Christmas Reindeers" (December 22, 1968)
    - "Santa Claus Routine with Arthur Godfrey" (December 24, 1967)
- Andy Williams
  - The Andy Williams Show
    - Williams hosted a Christmas-themed episode annually.
- Cher
  - "Christmas Special" (December 21, 1975)
- Dolly
  - "A Down Home Country Christmas" (December 20, 1987)

== Comedy ==
=== Animated ===
- American Dad!
  - "The Best Christmas Story Never Told" (Season 2, Episode 9) (December 17, 2006)
  - "The Most Adequate Christmas Ever" (Season 3, Episode 8) (December 16, 2007)
  - "Rapture's Delight" (Season 5, Episode 9) (December 13, 2009)
  - "For Whom the Sleigh Bell Tolls" (Season 6, Episode 8) (December 12, 2010)
  - "Season's Beatings" (Season 7, Episode 7) (December 11, 2011)
  - "Minstrel Krampus" (Season 9, Episode 8) (December 15, 2013)
  - "Dreaming of a White Porsche Christmas" (Season 12, Episode 6) (December 1, 2014/TBS)
  - "Gifted Me Liberty" (Season 13, Episode 20) (June 13, 2016/TBS)
  - "Ninety North, Zero West" (Season 14, Episode 7) (December 19, 2016/TBS)
  - "Santa, Schmanta" (Season 15, Episode 1) (December 25, 2017/TBS)
  - "Yule. Tide. Repeat." (Season 17, Episode 22) (December 21, 2020/TBS)
  - "The Grounch" (Season 19, Episode 22) (December 19, 2022/TBS)
  - "Into the Jingleverse" (Season 20, Episode 22) (December 18, 2023/TBS)
  - "Nasty Christmas" (Season 21, Episode 9) (December 23, 2024/TBS)
- Baby Blues
  - "A Baby Blues Christmas Special" (Season 1, Episode 12) (2002)
- Batman: Caped Crusader
  - "The Spectral Hand" (2026)
- Beavis and Butt-head
  - "A Very Special Christmas With Beavis and Butt-head" (Season 3, Episode 29) (December 17, 1993)
  - "Huh-Huh-Humbug/It's a Miserable Life" (Season 6, Episode 7 & 8) (December 19, 1995)
- Big Mouth / Human Resources
  - "A Very Big Mouth Christmas" (Season 5, Episode 8) (2021)
  - "Yipee Ki-Hate, Motherf**ker" (Season 2, Episode 10) (2023)
- Bless the Harts
  - "Miracle on Culpepper Slims Boulevard" (Season 1, Episode 8) (December 15, 2019)
- Bob's Burgers
  - "Bob Rest Ye Merry Gentle-Mannequins" (Season 3, Episode 9) (December 16, 2012)
  - "Christmas in the Car" (Season 4, Episode 8) (December 15, 2013)
  - "Father of the Bob" (Season 5, Episode 6) (December 7, 2014)
  - "Nice-Capades" (Season 6, Episode 5) (November 15, 2015)
  - "The Last Gingerbread House on the Left" (Season 7, Episode 7) (November 27, 2016)
  - "The Bleakening, Parts 1 & 2" (Season 8, Episodes 6 & 7) (December 10, 2017)
  - "Better Off Sled" (Season 9, Episode 10) (December 9, 2018)
  - "Have Yourself a Maily Linda Christmas" (Season 10, Episode 10) (December 15, 2019)
  - "Yachty or Nice" (Season 11, Episode 10) (December 13, 2020)
  - "Gene's Christmas Break" (Season 12, Episode 10) (December 19, 2021)
  - "The Plight Before Christmas" (Season 13, Episode 10) (December 11, 2022)
  - "The Nightmare 2 Days Before Christmas" (Season 14, Episode 10) (December 17, 2023)
  - "Dog Christmas Day After Afternoon" (Season 15, Episode 9) (December 15, 2024)
  - "It's a Stunter-ful Life" (Season 16, Episode 9) (December 14, 2025)
  - "On the Fort Day of Christmas" (Season 17, Episode 1) (December 7, 2026)
- BoJack Horseman
  - "Sabrina's Christmas Wish" (December 19, 2014)
- Chicago Party Aunt
  - "Emergency Contact" (Season 1, Episode 8) (2021)
- The Cleveland Show
  - "A Cleveland Brown Christmas" (Season 1, Episode 9) (December 13, 2009)
  - "Murray Christmas" (Season 2, Episode 8) (December 5, 2010)
  - "Die Semi-Hard" (Season 3, Episode 7) (December 11, 2011)
  - " 'Tis the Cleveland to Be Sorry" (Season 4, Episode 6) (December 16, 2012)
- Clone High
  - "Snowflake Day: A Very Special Holiday Episode" (Season 1, Episode 11) (2003)
- Daria
  - "Depth Takes a Holiday" (Season 3, Episode 4) (1999)
  - "Antisocial Climbers" (Season 4, Episode 2) (2000)
- Dr. Katz, Professional Therapist
  - "Office Management" (Season 2, Episode 4) (December 17, 1995)
- F Is for Family
  - "O Holy Moly Night" (Season 1, Episode 6) (December 18, 2015)
  - "A Very Merry F***ing Christmas" (Season 5, Episode 7) (2021)
  - "Bye Bye, Frankie" (Season 5, Episode 8) (2021)
- Family Guy
  - "A Very Special Family Guy Freakin' Christmas" (Season 3, Episode 16) (December 21, 2001)
  - "Road to the North Pole" (Season 9, Episode 7) (December 12, 2010)
  - "Jesus, Mary and Joseph!" (Season 11, Episode 8) (December 23, 2012)
  - "Christmas Guy" (Season 12, Episode 8) (December 15, 2013)
  - "The 2000-Year-Old Virgin" (Season 13, Episode 6) (December 7, 2014)
  - "How the Griffin Stole Christmas" (Season 15, Episode 9) (December 11, 2016)
  - "Don't Be a Dickens at Christmas" (Season 16, Episode 9) (December 10, 2017)
  - "Christmas is Coming" (Season 18, Episode 9) (December 15, 2019)
  - "The First No L" (Season 19, Episode 9) (December 13, 2020)
  - "Christmas Crime" (Season 20, Episode 10) (December 19, 2021)
  - "The Return of the King (of Queens)" (Season 22, Episode 9) (December 17, 2023)
  - "Gift of the White Guy" (Season 23, Episode 2) (November 25, 2024/Hulu)
  - "Disney's Hulu's Family Guy's Hallmark Channel's Lifetime's Unoriginal Holiday Movie" (November 28, 2025/Hulu)
  - "The Peter Clause" (2026/Hulu)
- Futurama
  - "Xmas Story" (Season 2, Episode 8) (December 19, 1999)
  - "A Tale of Two Santas" (Season 4, Episode 2) (December 23, 2001)
  - "The Futurama Holiday Spectacular" (Season 7, Episode 13) (November 21, 2010/Comedy Central)
  - "I Know What You Did Next Xmas" (Season 8, Episode 6) (August 28, 2023/Hulu)
- Glenn Martin, DDS
  - "Deck the Malls" (Season 1, Episode 14) (November 29, 2009)
  - "A Very Martin Christmas" (Season 2, Episode 9) (December 3, 2010)
- The Great North
  - "Dip the Halls Adventure" (Season 2, Episode 10) (December 19, 2021)
  - "Xmas With the Skanks Adventure" (Season 3, Episode 10) (December 11, 2022)
- HouseBroken
  - "Who's Found Themselves in One of Those Magical Christmas Life Swap Switcheroos?" (Season 2, Episode 1) (December 4, 2022)
  - "Who's Having a Merry Trashmas?" (Season 2, Episode 2) (December 4, 2022)
- Kid Notorious
  - "White Christmas" (Season 1, Episode 9) (December 17, 2003)
- King of the Hill
  - "The Unbearable Blindness of Laying" (Season 2, Episode 11) (December 21, 1997)
  - "Pretty, Pretty Dresses" (Season 3, Episode 9) (December 15, 1998)
  - "Hillennium" (Season 4, Episode 10) (December 19, 1999)
  - "Twas the Nut Before Christmas" (Season 5, Episode 8) (December 17, 2000)
  - "The Father, the Son, and J.C." (Season 6, Episode 4) (December 16, 2001)
  - "Livin' on Reds, Vitamin C and Propane" (Season 8, Episode 7) (December 14, 2003)
  - "Ms. Wakefield" (Season 9, Episode 2) (December 19, 2004)
- Koala Man
  - "Hot Christmas" (Season 1, Episode 9) (2023)
- Paradise PD
  - "Christmas in Paradise" (Season 1, Episode 10) (August 31, 2018)
- The PJs
  - "How the Super Stoled Christmas" (Season 1, Episode 14) (December 17, 1999)
- Santa Inc.: (8 episode Stop-Motion 2021 series)
- The Simpsons
    - The Tracey Ullman Show short: "Simpson Xmas" (December 18, 1988)
    - "Simpsons Roasting on an Open Fire" (Season 1, Episode 1) (December 17, 1989)
    - "Marge Be Not Proud" (Season 7, Episode 11) (December 17, 1995)
    - "Miracle on Evergreen Terrace" (Season 9, Episode 10) (December 21, 1997)
    - "Grift of the Magi" (Season 11, Episode 9) (December 19, 1999)
    - "Skinner's Sense of Snow" (Season 12, Episode 8) (December 17, 2000)
    - "She of Little Faith" (Season 13, Episode 6) (December 16, 2001)
    - "Dude, Where's My Ranch?" (Season 14, Episode 18) (April 27, 2003)
    - "'Tis the Fifteenth Season" (Season 15, Episode 7) (December 14, 2003)
    - "Simpsons Christmas Stories" (Season 17, Episode 9) (December 18, 2005)
    - "Kill Gil, Volumes I & II" (Season 18, Episode 9) (December 17, 2006)
    - "Treehouse of Horror XIX" (Segment: Untitled Robot Parody) (Season 20, Episode 4) (November 2, 2008)
    - "The Fight Before Christmas" (Season 22, Episode 8) (December 5, 2010)
    - "Holidays of Future Passed" (Season 23, Episode 9) (December 11, 2011)
    - "White Christmas Blue" (Season 25, Episode 8) (December 15, 2013)
    - "I Won't Be Home for Christmas" (Season 26, Episode 9) (December 7, 2014)
    - "The Nightmare After Krustmas" (Season 28, Episode 10) (December 11, 2016)
    - "Gone Boy" (Season 29, Episode 9) (December 10, 2017)
    - "Tis the 30th Season" (Season 30, Episode 10) (December 9, 2018)
    - "Bobby, It's Cold Outside" (Season 31, Episode 10) (December 15, 2019)
    - "The Way of the Dog" (Season 31, Episode 22) (May 17, 2020)
    - "A Springfield Summer Christmas for Christmas" (Season 32, Episode 10) (December 13, 2020)
    - "Manger Things" (Season 32, Episode 16) (March 21, 2021)
    - "The Simpsons Meet the Bocellis in "Feliz Navidad"" (2022 Disney+ short) (December 15, 2022)
    - "O C'mon All Ye Faithful" (Season 36, Episode 10–11) (December 17, 2024/Disney+)
- Solar Opposites
  - A Very Solar Holiday Opposites Special (Season 3, Episode 17) (November 22, 2021)
- South Park
  - "Mr. Hankey, the Christmas Poo" (Season 1, Episode 9) (December 17, 1997)
  - "Merry Christmas, Charlie Manson!" (Season 2, Episode 16) (December 9, 1998)
  - "Mr. Hankey's Christmas Classics" (Season 3, Episode 15) (December 1, 1999)
  - "A Very Crappy Christmas" (Season 4, Episode 17) (December 20, 2000)
  - "Red Sleigh Down" (Season 6, Episode 17) (December 11, 2002)
  - "It's Christmas in Canada" (Season 7, Episode 15) (December 17, 2003)
  - "Woodland Critter Christmas" (Season 8, Episode 14) (December 15, 2004)
  - "HappyHolograms" (Season 18, Episode 10) (December 10, 2014)
  - "Bike Parade" (Season 22, Episode 10) (December 12, 2018)
  - "Christmas Snow" (Season 23, Episode 10) (December 11, 2019)
  - "The Crap Out" (Season 28, Episode 5) (December 10, 2025)
- SuperMansion
  - "War on Christmas" (December 8, 2016)
- Tuca and Bertie
  - "SweetBeak" (Season 1, Episode 10) (2019)

==== Adult Swim ====
- Aqua Teen Hunger Force
  - "Mail Order Bride" (Season 1, Episode 17) (December 22, 2002)
  - "Cybernetic Ghost of Christmas Past from the Future" (Season 1, Episode 18) (December 29, 2002)
  - "T-shirt of the Dead" (Season 3, Episode 11) (October 10, 2004)
  - "A PE Christmas" (Season 7, Episode 1) (December 13, 2009)
- Black Dynamite
  - " 'A Crisis at Christmas' or 'The Dark Side of the Dark Side of the Moon!' " (Season 1, Episode 4) (August 5, 2012)
- Black Jesus
  - "A Very Special Christmas In Compton" (Season 2, Episode 11) (November 27, 2015)
- The Boondocks
  - "A Huey Freeman Christmas" (Season 1, Episode 7) (December 18, 2005)
- Metalocalypse
  - "Dethmas" (Season 3, Episode 4) (December 7, 2009)
- Mike Tyson Mysteries
  - "The Christmas Episode" (Season 4, Episode 11) (December 10, 2019)
- Moral Orel
  - "The Best Christmas Ever" (Season 1, Episode 10) (December 13, 2005)
- NTSF:SD:SUV::
  - "Christmas Activity" (Season 2, Episode 14) (December 7, 2012)
  - "Wreck the Malls" (Season 3, Episode 12) (December 13, 2013)
- President Curtis
  - "Synths" (Season 1, Episode 9) (2026)
- Rick and Morty
  - "Anatomy Park" (Season 1, Episode 3) (December 16, 2013)
  - "Rattlestar Ricklactica" (Season 4, Episode 5) (December 15, 2019)
  - "Ricktional Mortpoon's Rickmas Mortcation" (Season 6, Episode 10) (December 11, 2022)
- Robot Chicken
  - "Christmas Special" (Season 1, Episode 22) (December 22, 2005)
  - "Robot Chicken's Half-Assed Christmas Special" (Season 3, Episode 14) (December 9, 2007)
  - "Dear Consumer" (Season 4, Episode 20) (December 6, 2009)
  - "Robot Chicken's DP Christmas Special" (Season 5, Episode 1) (December 12, 2010)
  - "Robot Chicken's ATM Christmas Special" (Season 6, Episode 13) (December 17, 2012)
  - "Born Again Virgin Christmas Special" (Season 6, Episode 21) (December 17, 2013)
  - "Lots of Holidays (But Don't Worry Christmas Is Still in There Too So Pull the Stick Out of Your Ass Fox News) Special" (Season 7, Episode 20) (December 7, 2014)
  - "Robot Chicken Christmas Special: The X-Mas United" (Season 8, Episode 7) (December 13, 2015)
  - "Freshly Baked: The Robot Chicken Santa Claus Pot Cookie Freakout Special: Special Edition" (Season 9, Episode 1) (December 10, 2017)
  - "Robot Chicken's Santa's Dead (Spoiler Alert) Holiday Murder Thing Special" (Season 10, Episode 11) (December 9, 2019)
- Sealab 2021
  - "Feast of Alvis" (Season 2, Episode 8) (December 29, 2002)
- Smiling Friends
  - "Charlie Dies and Doesn't Come Back" (Season 1, Episode 8) (January 30, 2022)
  - "Pim Finally Turns Green" (Season 2, Episode 8) (June 24, 2024)
  - "The Glep Ep" (Season 3, Episode 8) (November 30, 2025)
- Space Ghost Coast to Coast
  - "A Space Ghost Christmas" (December 25, 1994)
  - "Waiting for Edward" (Season 5, Episode 11) (December 25, 1998)
- Squidbillies
  - "Rebel with a Claus" (Season 2, Episode 14) (December 24, 2006)
  - "The War on The War on Christmas" (Season 11, Episode 9) (December 10, 2017)
- Stroker & Hoop
  - "I Saw Stroker Killing Santa Claus (a.k.a. A Cold, Dead, White Christmas)" (Season 1, Episode 10) (December 4, 2005)
- Superjail!
  - "Mr. Grumpy-Pants" (Season 1, Episode 7) (November 9, 2008)
- Tom Goes to the Mayor
  - "Rats Off to Ya!" (Season 1, Episode 5) (December 19, 2004)
- The Venture Bros.
  - "A Very Venture Christmas" (Season 1, Episode 14) (December 19, 2004)
- Three Busy Debras
  - " Very Debra Christmas" (Season 1, Episode 1) (March 29, 2020)
- Tim and Eric Awesome Show, Great Job!
  - "Man Milk" (Season 5, Episode 10) (May 2, 2010)
  - "Chrimbus Special" (December 5, 2010)
- YOLO: Crystal Fantasy
  - "A Very Extremely Very Yolo Christmas: Reloaded" (Season 1, Episode 3) (August 16, 2020)
  - "The Wollongong Santa Pub Crawl!!! RAWR!!!!" (Season 3, Episode 7) (April 20, 2025)

==== Disney Channel, Disney XD ====
- A.N.T. Farm
  - "SANTa's Little Helpers" (Season 1, Episode 20) (December 9, 2011)
  - "SilANT Night" (Season 3, Episode 15) (December 6, 2013)
- Adventures in Wonderland
  - "Christmas In Wonderland" (Season 3, Episode 4) (1992)
- Austin & Ally
  - "Big Dreams & Big Apples" (Season 2 episode 6) (December 7, 2012)
  - "Mix-Ups and Mistletoe" (Season 3, Episode 5) (December 1, 2013)
  - "Santas and Surprises" (Season 4, Episode 18) (December 6, 2015)
- Best Friends Whenever
  - "The Girls of Christmas Past" (Season 1, Episode 13) (December 6, 2015)
  - "The Christmas Curse" (Season 2, Episode 11) (December 4, 2016)
- Bizaardvark
  - "Augh, Humbug!" (Season 1, Episode 17) (December 11, 2016)
  - "A Killer Robot Christmas" (Season 2, Episode 14) (December 8, 2017)
  - "Holiday Video Sketchtacular" (Season 3, Episode 8) (December 7, 2018)
- Bunk'd
  - "Secret Santa" (Season 1, Episode 9) (December 4, 2015)
  - "How the Griff Stole Christmas" (Season 2, Episode 11) (December 2, 2016)
  - "Summer Winter Wonderland" (Season 4, Episode 15) (December 7, 2019)
  - "Hauntin' Around the Christmas Tree" (Season 6, Episode 10) (December 2, 2022)
  - "Friends in Snow Places" (Season 7, Episode 12) (December 1, 2023)
- Coop & Cami Ask the World
  - " Would You Wrather Get a Moose Angry?" (Season 1, Episode 8) (December 8, 2018)
  - "Would You Wrather Lose Your Presents?" (Season 2, Episode 9) (December 7, 2019)
- Crash & Bernstein
  - "Merry Crashenfest" (Season 2, Episode 8) (December 3, 2013)
- Disney Fam Jam
  - "Jolly Holidance" (Season 1, Episode 19) (December 4, 2020)
- Disney's Magic Bake-Off
  - "Holiday" (December 3, 2021)
- Dog with a Blog
  - "Bark! The Herald Angels Sing" (Season 1, Episode 6) (December 2, 2012)
  - "Twas the Fight Before Christmas" (Season 2, Episode 7) (December 6, 2013)
  - "Stan Steals Christmas" (Season 3, Episode 6) (December 5, 2014)
- Electric Bloom
  - "How We Defeated a Jingle Bell Bully" (Season 1, Episode 15) (2025)
- The Famous Jett Jackson
  - "What Money Can't Buy" (December 10, 1999) (Season 2, Episode 14)
- Gabby Duran & the Unsittables
  - "It's Christmas, Gabby Duran!" (December 6, 2019) (Season 1, Episode 8)
- Good Luck Charlie
  - "Good Luck Charlie, It's Christmas!" (December 2, 2011)
  - "A Duncan Christmas" (Season 3, Episode 21) (December 2, 2012)
  - "Good Luck Jessie" NYC Christmas" (Season 4, Episode 17) (2013)
- Hannah Montana
  - "Killing Me Softly With His Height" (Season 3, Episode 5) (December 14, 2008)
  - "It's the End of the Jake as We Know It" (Season 4, Episode 5) (2010)
- I Didn't Do It
  - "Merry Miss Sis" (Season 1, Episode 20) (December 7, 2014)
- Jessie
  - "Christmas Story" (Season 1, Episode 8) (December 9, 2011)
  - "Nanny in Miami" (Season 2, Episode 6) (December 7, 2012)
  - "Good Luck Jessie: NYC Christmas" (Season 3, Episode 7) (2013)
  - "Jessie's Aloha-Holidays with Parker and Joey" (Season 3, Episode 26) (2014)
- Just Roll with It
  - "Merry Christmas, Mr. Gooch" (Season 1, Episode 18) (December 6, 2019)
  - "It's The Most Wonderful Crime of the Year" (Season 2, Episode 12) (December 11, 2020)
- K.C. Undercover
  - " 'Twas the Fight Before Christmas" (Season 1, Episode 27) (December 6, 2015)
  - "Holly Holly Not So Jolly" (Season 2, Episode 22) (December 4, 2016)
- Kickin' It
  - "Oh, Christmas Nuts!" (Season 2, Episode 24) (December 3, 2012)
- Kirby Buckets
  - "It's A Kirbyful Life!" (Season 2, Episode 8) (2015)
- Lab Rats
  - " 'Twas the Mission Before Christmas" (Season 2, Episode 23) (December 3, 2013)
  - "Merry Glitchmas" (Season 3, Episode 18) (December 1, 2014)
- Liv and Maddie
  - "Fa-la-la-A-Rooney" (Season 1, Episode 10) (December 1, 2013)
  - "Joy to-A-Rooney" (Season 3, Episode 9) (December 6, 2015)
  - "Cali Christmas-A-Rooney" (Season 4, Episode 6) (December 2, 2016)
- Lizzie McGuire
  - "Aaron Carter's Coming to Town" (2001) (Season 1, Episode 7)
  - "Xtreme Xmas" (December 6, 2003) (Season 2, Episode 20)
- Pair of Kings
  - "Pair of Santas" (Season 2, Episode 16) (December 5, 2011)
- Phil of the Future
  - "Christmas Break" (December 2, 2005) (Season 2, Episode 14)
- The Santa Clauses
  - (2022)
- Shake It Up
  - "Jingle It Up" (Season 2, Episode 11) (December 11, 2011)
  - "Merry Merry It Up" (Season 3, Episode 5) (December 2, 2012)
- So Random!
  - "Justin Bieber" (Season 1, Episode 18) (December 4, 2011)
- So Weird
  - "Fountain" (Season 2, Episode 13) (December 10, 1999)
- Sonny with a Chance
  - "A So Random Holiday Special" (Season 2, Episode 22) (2010)
- Stuck in the Middle
  - "Stuck at Christmas - The Movie" (December 8, 2017)
- Sydney to the Max
  - "How the Syd Stole Christmas" (Season 2, Episode 1) (December 13, 2019)
- The Suite Life of Zack & Cody / The Suite Life on Deck
  - "Christmas at the Tipton" (Season 1, Episode 21) (December 10, 2005)
  - "A London Carol" (Season 3, Episode 15) (December 3, 2010)
- That's So Raven / Raven's Home
  - "Escape Claus" (Season 2, Episode 4) (December 5, 2003)
  - "Bah Humbugged" (Season 3, Episode 16) (December 6, 2019)
  - "Mad About Yuletide" (Season 4, Episode 7) (December 18, 2020)
  - "A Country Cousin Christmas" (Season 5, Episode 25) (December 2, 2022)
- Vampirina: Teenage Vampire
  - "First Holiday" (Season 1, Episode 10) (2025)
- The Villains of Valley View
  - "How the Villains Stole Christmas" (Season 1, Episode 19) (December 2, 2022)
  - "A Very Villain Christmas" (Season 2, Episode 18) (December 1, 2023)
- Wizards Beyond Waverly Place
  - "It's Beginning to Look a Lot Like Wizmas" (Season 2, Episode 7) (2025)
- Zeke and Luther
  - "Bro Ho Ho" (Season 2, Episode 26) (December 6, 2010)

==== Nickelodeon ====
- 100 Deeds for Eddie McDowd
  - "A Very Canine Christmas" (Season 1, Episode 20) (December 5, 2000)
- The Adventures of Pete & Pete
  - "O' Christmas Pete" (Season 3, Episode 11) (December 14, 1995)
- All That
  - "Run-DMC" (Season 2, Episode 10) (December 23, 1995)
  - "1134" (Season 1, Episode 34) (December 17, 2020)
- Big Time Rush
  - "Big Time Christmas" (December 4, 2010) (Season 2, Episodes 8-9)
- Bucket & Skinner's Epic Adventures
  - "Epic Christmas" (Season 1, Episode 16) (December 22, 2012)
- Cousin Skeeter
  - "Miracle on 32nd Skeet" (Season 1, Episode 15) (December 17, 1998)
- Drake & Josh
  - "Merry Christmas, Drake & Josh" (December 5, 2008)
- The Fairly OddParents
  - "A Fairly Odd Christmas" (2012)
- Game Shakers
  - "A Reggae Potato Christmas" (Season 1, Episode 11) (2015)
- Henry Danger / Danger Force
  - "Christmas Danger" (Season 2, Episode 9) (2016)
  - "Holiday Punch" (Season 5, Episode 13) (2019)
- Danger Force
  - "Down Goes Santa, Part 1 & 2" (Season 1, Episodes 12–13) (December 12 & 18, 2020)
  - "Krampapalooza" (Season 2, Episode 5) (2021)
- Hey Dude
  - "Ride, She Said" (Season 4, Episode 2) (1990)
- How to Rock
  - "How To Rock Christmas" (Season 1, Episode 26) (December 8, 2012)
- iCarly
  - "iChristmas" (Season 2, Episode 7) (December 13, 2008)
- Instant Mom
  - "The Gift of the Maggies" (Season 1, Episode 9) (December 8, 2013)
- Kenan & Kel
  - "Merry Christmas, Kenan" (Season 1, Episode 11) (December 14, 1996)
- The Naked Brothers Band
  - "Christmas Special" (Season 3, Episode 5) (December 13, 2008)
- Nicky, Ricky, Dicky & Dawn
  - "Santa's Little Harpers" (Season 1, Episode 10) (2014)
- The Really Loud House
  - "A Loud House Christmas" (2021)
- Romeo!
  - "A Little So'em So'em for Christmas" (Season 1, Episode 10) (December 10, 2003)
- School of Rock
  - "Jingle Bell Rock" (Season 3, Episode 8) (December 3, 2017)
- Side Hustle
  - "Friendiversary" (Season 1, Episode 5) (December 5, 2020)
  - "A Mouth Noise Christmas" (Season 2, Episode 8) (2021)
- That Girl Lay Lay
  - "Fa-La-La-La-La-La-La-Lay Lay" (Season 1, Episode 12) (December 2, 2021)
  - "All I Want for Christmas is Lay Lay" (Season 2, Episode 23) (December 20, 2023)
- The Thundermans/The Thundermans: Undercover
  - "Winter Thunderland" (Season 2, Episode 11) (2014)
  - "The Most Thunderful Time of the Year" (Season 1, Episode 26) (December 17, 2025)
- The Troop
  - "The Good, The Bad and the Ickie Doll" (Season 1, Episode 11) (December 12, 2009)
- True Jackson, VP
  - "Telling Amanda" (Season 1, Episode 5) (December 13, 2008)
  - "True Parade" (Season 2, Episode 4) (December 12, 2009)
- Tyler Perry's Young Dylan
  - "Waiting for Santa" (Season 2, Episode 19) (December 2, 2021)
  - "A Delivery Van Christmas" (Season 4, Episode 16) (December 20, 2023)
  - "The Wrap Battle" (Season 5, Episode 1) (December 18, 2024)
- Victorious
  - "A Christmas Tori" (Season 2, Episode 12) (December 3, 2011)

=== Romantic Comedies ===
- With Love
  - "Nochebuena" (Season 1, Episode 1) (December 17, 2021)
  - "Christmas Eve" (Season 2, Episode 1) (June 2, 2023)
- The Holiday Shift
  - (Roku TV series)
- Twelve Dates 'Til Christmas
  - (Hallmark Channel series)
- Nobody Wants This
  - "Last Christmas" (Season 3, Episode 9) (2026)

=== Situation Comedies ===
- 2 Broke Girls
  - "And the Very Christmas Thanksgiving" (Season 1, Episode 10) (November 21, 2011)
  - "And the High Holidays" (Season 2, Episode 12) (December 17, 2012)
  - "And a Loan for Christmas" (Season 4, Episode 7) (December 15, 2014)
- 227
  - "Mary's Christmas" (Season 1, Episode 13) (December 14, 1985)
  - "The Night They Arrested Santa Claus" (Season 4, Episode 9) (December 10, 1988)
  - "Guess Who's Not Coming to Christmas" (Season 5, Episode 12) (December 16, 1989)
- 3rd Rock from the Sun
  - "Jolly Old St. Dick" (Season 2, Episode 12) (December 15, 1996)
- 30 Rock
  - Ludachristmas (December 13, 2007) (Season 2, Episode 9)
  - Christmas Special (December 11, 2008) (Season 3, Episode 6)
  - Secret Santa (December 10, 2009) (Season 4, Episode 8)
  - Christmas Attack Zone (December 9, 2010) (Season 5, Episode 10)
  - My Whole Life Is Thunder (December 6, 2012) (Season 7, Episode 8)
- The 5 Mrs. Buchanans
  - "What Child Is This" (Season 1, Episode 11) (December 10, 1994)
- 8 Simple Rules
  - "All I Want for Christmas" (Season 1, Episode 12) (December 10, 2002)
  - "A Very C.J. Christmas" (Season 3, Episode 12) (December 17, 2004)
- 9 to 5
  - "Blue Christmas" (Season 4, Episode 15) (December 13, 1986)
- Abbott Elementary
  - "Holiday Hookah" (December 7, 2022) (Season 2, Episode 10)
  - "Winter Show" (December 4, 2024) (Season 4, Episode 7)
  - "Winter Break" (December 4, 2024) (Season 4, Episode 8)
  - "Birthday" (December 10, 2025) (Season 5, Episode 8)
  - "Parents" (December 9, 2026) (Season 6, Episode 8)
- About a Boy
  - "About a Christmas Carol" (December 9, 2014) (Season 2, Episode 8)
- Acapulco
  - "The Most Wonderful Time of the Year" (2021) (Season 1, Episode 9)
- Accidentally on Purpose
  - "It Happened One Christmas" (Season 1, Episode 11) (December 14, 2009)
- According to Jim
  - "An According to Jiminy Christmas" (Season 1, Episode 10) (December 12, 2001)
  - "The Christmas Party" (Season 2, Episode 10) (December 10, 2002)
  - "Secret Santa" (Season 3, Episode 13) (December 9, 2003)
  - "Stalking Santa" (Season 4, Episode 10) (December 14, 2004)
  - "The Gift of the Maggie" (Season 5, Episode 12) (December 13, 2005)
  - "Two for the Money" (Season 8, Episode 5) (December 16, 2008)
- The Addams Family
  - "Christmas with the Addams Family" (Season 2, Episode 15) (December 24, 1965)
- Aggretsuko
  - "We Wish You a Metal Christmas" (Season 1, Episode 11) (2018)
- Alexa & Katie
  - "The Ghost of Cancer Past" (Season 2, Episode 8) (December 26, 2018)
  - "All I Want for Christmas is You" (Season 3, Episode 5) (December 30, 2019)
- ALF
  - "Oh, Tannerbaum" (Season 1, Episode 12) (December 15, 1986)
  - "ALF's Special Christmas" (Season 2, Episodes 12–13) (December 14, 1987)
- Alice
  - "A Semi-Merry Christmas" (Season 2, Episode 9) (December 18, 1977)
  - "Mel, the Magi" (Season 4, Episode 11) (December 23, 1979)
  - "Mel's Christmas Carol" (Season 6, Episode 9) (December 20, 1981)
  - 'Tis the Season to Be Jealous (Season 8, Episode 10) (December 25, 1983)
- Aliens in America
  - "Church" (December 10, 2007) (Season 1, Episode 10)
- All in the Family
  - "Christmas Day at the Bunkers" (Season 2, Episode 13) (December 18, 1971)
  - "Edith's Christmas Story" (Season 4, Episode 15) (December 22, 1973)
  - "The Draft Dodger" (Season 7, Episode 14) (December 25, 1976)
  - "Edith's Crisis of Faith: Part 1 & 2" (Season 8, Episodes 13 & 14) (December 25, 1977)
  - "The Bunkers Go West" (Season 9, Episode 11) (December 10, 1978)
  - "California, Here We Are" (Season 9, Episodes 12 & 13) (December 17, 1978)
  - Archie Bunker's Place
    - "Father Christmas" (Season 4, Episode 13) (December 19, 1982)
  - Gloria
    - "Miracle at Fox Ridge" (Season 1, Episode 11) (December 19, 1982)
- All of Us
  - "I Saw Tia Kissing Santa Claus" (Season 1, Episode 11) (December 16, 2003)
  - "Home for Christmas" (Season 2, Episode 10) (December 10, 2004)
  - "Who Took the Merry Out of Christmas?" (Season 3, Episode 11) (December 12, 2005)
  - "Everybody Loves Rain Man" (Season 4, Episode 10) (December 11, 2006)
- Almost Perfect
  - "Risky Christmas" (Season 1, Episode 12) (December 11, 1995)
  - "Gimme Shelter" (Season 2, Episode 7) (December 24, 1997)
- Amen
  - "Your Christmas Show of Shows" (Season 1, Episode 11) (December 20, 1986)
  - "The Twelve Songs of Christmas" (Season 2, Episode 11) (December 19, 1987)
  - "The Deacon's Donkey" (Season 3, Episode 10) (December 10, 1988)
  - "Thelma Frye, Dough Girl" (Season 4, Episode 12) (December 16, 1989)
  - "Miracle on 134th Street" (Season 5, Episodes 5 & 6) (December 22, 1990)
- American Housewife
  - "Krampus Katie" (December 13, 2016) (Season 1, Episode 9)
  - "Blue Christmas" (December 13, 2017) (Season 2, Episode 10)
  - "Saving Christmas" (December 12, 2018) (Season 3, Episode 10)
  - "The Bromance Before Christmas" (December 13, 2019) (Season 4, Episode 10)
- Arnie
  - "Let Them Eat Cookies" (Season 1, Episode 13) (December 12, 1970)
  - "The Gift of the Majors" (Season 2, Episode 13) (December 18, 1971)
- Arrested Development
  - In God We Trust (December 14, 2003) (Season 1, Episode 7)
  - Afternoon Delight (December 19, 2004) (Season 2, Episode 6)
- The Amos 'n Andy Show
  - "The Christmas Story" (Season 2, Episode 13) (December 25, 1952)
- The Andy Griffith Show
  - "A Christmas Story" (Season 1, Episode 11) (December 19, 1960)
- Anger Management
  - Charlie and the Christmas Hooker (Season 2, Episode 46) (December 19, 2013)
- Anything But Love
  - "Salmonella is Coming to Town" (Season 4, Episode 10) (December 18, 1991)
- Baby Boom
  - "I'll Be Home for Christmas" (Season 1, Episode 8) (December 21, 1988)
- Baby Daddy
  - "A Wheeler Family Christmas Outing" (Season 1, Episode 9) (August 22, 2012)
  - "Emma's First Christmas" (Season 2, Episode 16) (December 11, 2013)
  - "It's a Wonderful Emma" (Season 4, Episode 2) (December 10, 2014)
- Baby Talk
  - "Away in a Manger" (Season 2, Episode 11) (December 13, 1991)
- Bachelor Father
  - "Deck the Halls" (Season 5, Episode 13) (December 19, 1961)
- Back in the Game
  - "I'll Slide Home for Christmas" (December 11, 2013) (Season 1, Episode 10)
- Bad Judge
  - "Face Mask Mom" (December 11, 2014) (Season 1, Episode 9)
- Barney Miller
  - "Christmas Story" (Season 3, Episode 10) (December 23, 1976)
  - "Toys" (Season 5, Episode 12) (December 14, 1978)
  - "Homeless" (Season 8, Episode 7) (December 17, 1981)
  - Fish
    - "A Fish Christmas" (Season 2, Episode 9) (December 20, 1977)
- Becker
  - "Santa on Ice" (Season 2, Episode 12) (December 14, 1999)
  - "Dr. Angry Head" (Season 3, Episode 9) (December 11, 2000)
  - "The Ghost of Christmas Presents" (Season 4, Episode 10) (December 10, 2001)
  - "Chris-Mess" (Season 5, Episode 10) (December 15, 2002)
- Benson
  - "Mary and Her Lambs" (Season 4, Episode 10) (December 17, 1982)
  - "Home for Christmas" (Season 6, Episode 13) (December 21, 1984)
- The Bernie Mac Show
  - "A Christmas Story" (December 19, 2001) (Season 1, Episode 7)
  - "Road to Tradition" (December 14, 2003) (Season 3, Episode 3)
- Better with You
  - "Better with Christmas Crap" (Season 1, Episode 10) (December 8, 2010)
- The Betty Hutton Show
  - "The Christmas Story" (Season 1, Episode 12) (December 24, 1959)
- The Beverly Hillbillies
  - "Home for Christmas" (Season 1, Episode 13) (December 19, 1962)
  - "No Place Like Home" (Season 1, Episode 14) (December 26, 1962)
  - "The Clampetts Get Culture" (Season 2, Episode 13) (December 18, 1963)
  - "Christmas at the Clampetts" (Season 2, Episode 14) (December 25, 1963)
  - "The Christmas Present" (Season 5, Episode 15) (December 21, 1966)
  - "The Week Before Christmas" (Season 7, Episode 13) (December 18, 1968)
  - "Christmas in Hooterville" (Season 7, Episode 14) (December 25, 1968)
- Bewitched
  - "A Vision of Sugar Plums" (Season 1, Episode 15) (December 24, 1964; re-aired in 1965 with new introductory scene)
  - "Humbug Not to Be Spoken Here" (Season 4, Episode 16) (December 21, 1967)
  - "Santa Comes to Visit and Stays and Stays" (Season 6, Episode 14) (December 18, 1969)
  - "Sisters at Heart" (Season 7, Episode 13) (December 24, 1970)
- The Big Bang Theory
  - "The Bath Item Gift Hypothesis" (Season 2, Episode 11) (December 15, 2008)
  - "The Maternal Congruence" (Season 3, Episode 11) (December 14, 2009)
  - "The Santa Simulation" (Season 6, Episode 11) (December 13, 2012)
  - "The Cooper Extraction" (Season 7, Episode 11) (December 12, 2013)
  - "The Clean Room Infiltration" (Season 8, Episode 11) (December 11, 2014)
  - "The Holiday Summation" (Season 10, Episode 12) (January 5, 2017)
  - Georgie & Mandy's First Marriage
    - "Miami Beach and a Magical Family Christmas" (Season 2, Episode 10) (December 18, 2025)
- The Big Show Show
  - "The Big Christmas" (Season 1, Episode 10) (December 9, 2020)
- The Bill Cosby Show
  - "A Christmas Ballad" (December 21, 1969) (Season 1, Episode 13)
- The Bill Engvall Show
  - "The Night Before Christmas" (Season 2, Episode 11) (2008)
- Bing Crosby
  - The Bing Crosby Show
  - "The Christmas Show" (Season 1, Episode 14) (December 21, 1964)
- Black-ish
  - "Black Santa/White Christmas" (December 10, 2014) (Season 1, Episode 10)
  - "Stuff" (December 9, 2015) (Season 2, Episode 10)
  - "Just Christmas, Baby" (December 14, 2016) (Season 3, Episode 10)
  - "Sugar Daddy" (December 12, 2017) (Season 4, Episode 9)
  - "Christmas in Theater Eight" (December 11, 2018) (Season 5, Episode 8)
  - "Father Christmas" (December 10, 2019) (Season 6, Episode 10)
  - "Compton Around the Christmas Tree" (December 2, 2020) (Season 7, Episode 6)
  - Mixed-ish
    - "Do They Know It's Christmas?" (December 10, 2019) (Season 1, Episode 10)
- Bless This House
  - "Misery on 34th Street" (Season 1, Episode 13) (December 20, 1995)
- Bless This Mess
  - "Goose Glazing Time" (December 10, 2019) (Season 2, Episode 9)
- Blockbuster
  - "Sh*t Storm" (2022) (Season 1, Episode 10)
- Blossom
  - "It's a Marginal Life" (Season 2, Episode 13) (December 16, 1991)
- Bob
  - "A Christmas Story" (Season 1, Episode 12) (December 21, 1992)
  - "Have Yourself a Married Little Christmas" (Season 2, Episode 7) (December 27, 1993)
- The Bob Cummings Show
  - "A Date for Margaret/A Wife for Christmas" (Season 1, Episode 6) (February 6, 1955)
  - "The Christmas Spirit" (Season 2, Episode 13) (December 15, 1955)
  - "Grandpa's Christmas Visit" (Season 2, Episode 14) (December 22, 1955)
  - "Bob's Christmas Party" (Season 4, Episode 13) (December 24, 1957)
- The Bob Newhart Show
  - "His Busiest Season" (Season 1, Episode 14) (December 24, 1972)
  - "I'm Dreaming of a Slight Christmas" (Season 2, Episode 15) (December 22, 1973)
  - "Home Is Where the Hurt Is" (Season 3, Episode 15) (December 21, 1974)
  - "Bob Has to Have His Tonsils Out, So He Spends Christmas Eve in the Hospital" (Season 4, Episode 15) (December 20, 1975)
  - "Making Up Is the Thing to Do" (Season 5, Episode 13) (December 25, 1976)
  - " 'Twas the Pie Before Christmas" (Season 6, Episode 12) (December 24, 1977)
- Boston Common
  - "Arts and Craftiness" (Season 2, Episode 10) (December 8, 1996)
- Boy Meets World
  - Boy Meets World
    - "Santa's Little Helper" (Season 1, Episode 10) (December 10, 1993)
    - "Turnaround" (Season 2, Episode 12) (December 9, 1994)
    - "Easy Street" (Season 4, Episode 12) (December 13, 1996)
    - "A Very Topanga Christmas" (Season 5, Episode 11) (December 19, 1997)
    - "Santa's Little Helpers" (Season 6, Episode 11) (December 11, 1998)
  - Girl Meets World
    - "Girl Meets Home for the Holidays" (Season 1, Episode 16) (December 5, 2014)
    - "Girl Meets A Christmas Maya" (Season 3, Episode 18) (December 2, 2016)
- The Boys Are Back
  - "The Christmas Show" (Season 1, Episode 11) (December 14, 1994)
- The Brady Bunch
  - "The Voice of Christmas" (Season 1, Episode 12) (December 19, 1969)
  - A Very Brady Christmas
    - (1988 - reunion special)
- Bridget Loves Bernie
  - " 'Tis the Season" (Season 1, Episode 14) (December 16, 1972)
- Brooklyn Nine-Nine
  - "Christmas" (December 3, 2013) (Season 1, Episode 11)
  - "The Pontiac Bandit Returns" (December 7, 2014) (Season 2, Episode 10)
  - "Yippie Kayak" (December 13, 2015) (Season 3, Episode 10)
  - "Captain Latvi" (December 13, 2016) (Season 4, Episode 10)
- Brotherly Love
  - "A Roman Holiday" (Season 1, Episode 11) (December 18, 1995)
- Brothers
  - "The Christmas Story" (Season 1, Episode 13) (December 25, 1956)
- Brothers
  - "Happy Birthday Mel" (Season 1, Episode 14) (December 16, 1984)
- Brothers
  - "Christmas" (Season 1, Episode 11) (December 13, 2009)
- Buffalo Bill
  - "Have Yourself a Very Degrading Christmas" (Season 2, Episode 13) (1984)
- Café Americain
  - "Deck the Halls with Boughs of Holly" (Season 1, Episode 12) (December 18, 1993)
- Call Me Kat
  - "Call Me Chrismukkah" (Season 3, Episode 9) (December 8, 2022)
- Camp Wilder
  - "A Close Shave" (Season 1, Episode 12) (December 18, 1992)
- Can't Hurry Love
  - "A Very Kafka Christmas" (Season 1, Episode 12) (December 18, 1995)
- Car 54, Where Are You?
  - "Christmas at the 53rd" (Season 1, Episode 15) (December 24, 1961)
- Caroline in the City
  - "Caroline and the Christmas Break" (Season 1, Episode 10) (December 14, 1995)
  - "Caroline and the Red Sauce" (Season 2, Episode 10) (December 10, 1996)
  - "Caroline and the Used Car Salesman" (Season 3, Episode 11) (December 8, 1997)
  - "Caroline and the Decanter" (Season 3, Episode 12) (December 15, 1997)
  - "Caroline and the Fright Before Christmas" (Season 4, Episode 11) (December 21, 1998)
- Carol's Second Act
  - "Merry December 19" (Season 1, Episode 10) (December 12, 2019)
- The Cavanaughs
  - "Yes, Virginia, There Is a Pop" (Season 1, Episode 4) (December 22, 1986)
- Charlie & Co.
  - "Silent Knight" (Season 1, Episode 12) (December 11, 1985)
- Charles in Charge
  - "Home for the Holidays" (Season 1, Episode 11) (December 19, 1984)
  - "Yule Laff" (Season 3, Episode 5) (December 24, 1987)
- The Charmings
  - "Yes, Lilian, There Really Is a Santa Claus" (Season 2, Episode 10) (December 17, 1987)
- Cheers
  - "The Spy Who Came In for a Cold One" (Season 1, Episode 12) (December 16, 1982)
  - "A House is Not a Home" (Season 5, Episode 25) (April 30, 1987)
  - "Christmas Cheers" (Season 6, Episode 12) (December 17, 1987)
  - "Love Me, Love My Car" (Season 11, Episode 11) (December 17, 1992)
- Chico and the Man
  - "The Proposal" (Season 4, Episode 7) (1977)
- Cinema Insomnia
  - "Santa Claus Conquers the Martians" (Season 1, Episode 7) (2005)
- City Guys
  - "A Gift of Friendship" (Season 1, Episode 14) (December 12, 1998)
  - "Miracle on 134th Street and Lexington Avenue" (Season 2, Episode 20) (November 27, 1999)
  - "Pier Pressure" (Season 4, Episode 25) (December 16, 2000)
- Clueless
  - "A Very PC Holiday" (December 16, 1997) (Season 2, Episode 12)
  - "Our Lady of Rodeo Drive" (December 15, 1998) (Season 3, Episode 9)
- Coach
  - "Christmas Brains" (Season 3, Episode 12) (December 18, 1990)
  - "My True Love Gave to Me..." (Season 5, Episode 12) (December 16, 1992)
  - "Christmas of the Van Damned" (Season 6, Episode 12) (December 14, 1993)
  - "You Win Some, You Lose Some" (Season 9, Episode 8) (December 18, 1996)
- Comedy Central
  - Workaholics
    - "The Strike" (2011)
  - Reno 911!
    - "It's a Wonderful Heist" (2022)
- Coming of Age
  - "Christmas at the Dunes" (Season 2, Episode 10) (1989)
- Complete Savages
  - "Savage XXX-mas" (Season 1, Episode 13) (December 17, 2004)
- Community
  - "Comparative Religion" (December 10, 2009) (Season 1, Episode 12)
  - "Abed's Uncontrollable Christmas" (December 9, 2010) (Season 2, Episode 11)
  - "Regional Holiday Music" (December 8, 2011) (Season 3, Episode 10)
  - "Intro to Knots" (April 18, 2013) (Season 4, Episode 10)
- The Cosby Show
  - "Father's Day" (Season 1, Episode 12) (December 20, 1984)
  - "Getting to Know You" (Season 6, Episode 12) (December 14, 1989)
  - "Clair's Place" (Season 8, Episode 12) (December 19, 1991)
- Cristela
  - "It's Not About the Tamales" (Season 1, Episode 9) (December 12, 2014)
- The Crew
  - "The Worst Noel" (Season 1, Episode 13) (December 14, 1995)
- Crumbs
  - "The Gift of the Magpie" (Season 1 Episode 9) (2006, unaired)
- Curb Your Enthusiasm
  - "Mary, Joseph and Larry" (Season 3, Episode 9) (2002)
- Cybill
  - "A Hell of a Christmas" (Season 3, Episode 11) (December 9, 1996)
- Dads
  - "The Glitch That Stole Christmas" (Season 1, Episode 11) (December 3, 2013)
- DAG
  - "A Whitman Christmas Sampler" (Season 1, Episode 5) (December 12, 2000)
- Date with the Angels
  - "Santa's Helper" (Season 1, Episode 26) (December 13, 1957)
- Dave's World
  - "I Saw Mommy Kicking Santa Claus" (2-part episode) (Season 1, Episode 13–14) (December 13 & 20, 1993)
- Day by Day
  - "Merry Kristin" (Season 2, Episode 6) (December 18, 1988)
- D.C. Follies
  - "Reagan Accidentally Gives Fred a Nuke for Christmas" (Season 1, Episode 12) (1987)
- Dear John
  - "Dancing in the Dark" (Season 1, Episode 8) (December 15, 1988)
  - " 'Twas the Fight Before Christmas" (Season 4, Episode 11) (December 27, 1991)
- Dear Phoebe
  - "The Christmas Show" (Season 1, Episode 16) (December 24, 1954)
- December Bride
  - "The Christmas Show" (Season 1, Episode 12) (December 20, 1954)
  - "Car for Christmas" (Season 5, Episode 12) (December 18, 1958)
- Dennis the Menace
  - "Dennis and Christmas" (Season 1, Episode 11) (December 13, 1959)
  - "The Christmas Horse" (Season 2, Episode 12) (December 25, 1960)
  - "The Fifteen-Foot Christmas Tree" (Season 3, Episode 12) (December 25, 1961)
- Delta
  - "A Christmas Tale" (Season 1, Episode 11) (December 17, 1992)
- Designing Women
  - "I'll Be Home for Christmas" (Season 2, Episode 12) (December 21, 1987)
  - "Julia and Mary Jo Get Stuck Under a Bed" (Season 6, Episode 11) (December 2, 1991)
  - "Tales Out of School" (Season 6, Episode 13) (December 16, 1991)
- Dharma & Greg
  - "Haus Arrest" (Season 1, Episode 12) (December 17, 1997)
- The Dick Van Dyke Show
  - "The Alan Brady Show Presents" (Season 3, Episode 13) (December 18, 1963)
  - "Uhny Uftz" (Season 5, Episode 3) (1965)
- Difficult People
  - "Difficult Christmas" (2015) (Season 1, Episode 8)
- A Different World
  - "The Gift of the Magi" (Season 1, Episode 10) (December 17, 1987)
  - "For Whom the Jingle Bell Tolls" (Season 3, Episode 10) (December 21, 1989)8
  - "I'm Dreaming of a Dwayne Christmas" (Season 4, Episode 11) (December 13, 1990)
  - "Twelve Steps of Christmas" (Season 5, Episode 12) (December 19, 1991)
  - "White Christmas" (Season 6, Episode 13) (December 17, 1992)
- Diff'rent Strokes
  - "Retrospective" (Season 1, Episodes 8 & 9) (December 29, 1978)
  - "Santa's Helper" (Season 5, Episode 12) (December 18, 1982)
- Dinosaurs
  - "Happy Refrigerator Day" (December 12, 1991) (Season 2, Episode 12)
- DMV
  - "Splash Fountain" (December 1, 2025) (Season 1, Episode 8)
  - "The Next Window" (December 8, 2025) (Season 1, Episode 9)
- Donna Reed
  - The Donna Reed Show
    - "A Very Merry Christmas" (Season 1, Episode 14) (December 24, 1958)
- Doris Day
  - The Doris Day Show
    - "A Two-Family Christmas" (Season 2, Episode 11) (December 22, 1969)
    - "It's Christmas Time in the City" (Season 3, Episode 15) (December 21, 1970)
  - "Whodunnit, Doris?" (Season 4, Episode 14) (December 13, 1971)
- Double Trouble
  - "O Come All Ye Faithful" (Season 2, Episode 4) (December 22, 1984)
- Down to Earth
  - "Christmas Story" (Season 4, Episode 24) (1984)
- Dr. Ken
  - "The Master Scheduler" (Season 1, Episode 10) (December 11, 2015)
  - "A Park Family Christmas" (Season 2, Episode 11) (December 16, 2016)
- Dream On
  - "Silent Night, Holy Cow" (Parts 1 & 2) (December 18, 1993) (Season 4, Episodes 13–14)
- Drew Carey
  - The Drew Carey Show
    - "Isomers Have Distinct Characteristics" (Season 1, Episode 12) (December 20, 1995)
      - "Lisa Gets Married" (Season 2, Episode 11) (December 18, 1996)
    - "The Vacation" (Season 3, Episode 12) (December 17, 1997)
    - "Drew's Holiday Punch" (Season 4, Episode 13) (December 16, 1998)
    - "Fetal Attraction" (Season 6, Episode 11) (December 20, 2000)
- Drexell's Class
  - "Silent Night, Holy Smokes" (Season 1, Episode 12) (December 12, 1991)
- Ellen
  - "The Christmas Show" (Season 2, Episode 12) (December 14, 1994)
  - "Do You Fear What I Fear?" (Season 3, Episode 12) (December 20, 1995)
  - "Fleas Navidad" (Season 4, Episode 12) (December 18, 1996)
- The Ellen Show
  - "Ellen's First Christmess" (Season 1, Episode 11) (December 17, 2001)
- Empty Nest
  - "A Christmas Story" (Season 2, Episode 11) (December 16, 1989)
- Ethel and Albert
  - "The Christmas Angel" (Season 2, Episode 15) (1953)
- Eternally Yours
  - "Merry Cursemas" (Season 1, Episode 9) (2026)
- Eve
  - " 'Twas the Fight Before Christmas" (Season 1, Episode 11) (December 15, 2003)
  - "All About Christmas Eve" (Season 3, Episode 11) (December 15, 2005)
- The Eve Arden Show
  - "The Christmas Angel" (Season 1, Episode 14) (December 24, 1957)
- Evening Shade
  - "The Wood Who Stole Christmas" (Season 1, Episode 11) (December 17, 1990)
  - "I'll Be Home for Christmas" (Season 3, Episode 12) (December 21, 1992)
- Everybody Hates Chris
  - "Everybody Hates Christmas" (December 15, 2005) (Season 1, Episode 11)
  - "Everybody Hates Kris" (December 11, 2006) (Season 2, Episode 10)
  - "Everybody Hates Kwanzaa" (December 10, 2007) (Season 3, Episode 10)
- Everybody Loves Raymond
  - "The Ball" (Season 1, Episode 12) (December 20, 1996)
  - "All I Want for Christmas" (Season 2, Episode 12) (December 15, 1997)
  - "The Toaster" (Season 3, Episode 12) (December 14, 1998)
  - "The Christmas Picture" (Season 4, Episode 11) (December 13, 1999)
  - "Christmas Present" (Season 5, Episode 10) (December 11, 2000)
  - "Seasons Greetings" (Season 6, Episode 12) (December 17, 2001)
  - "The Thought That Counts" (Season 7, Episode 11) (December 9, 2002)
  - "Jazz Records" (Season 8, Episode 10) (December 15, 2003)
- The Exes
  - "How the Grinch Spent Xmas" (Season 3, Episode 12) (December 18, 2013)
- The Expanding Universe of Ashley Garcia]
  - "The True Meaning of Christmas Togetherness Funtime" (Season 1, Episode 15) (December 9, 2020)
- The Facts of Life
  - "The Christmas Show" (Season 5, Episode 12) (December 21, 1983)
  - "Christmas in the Big House" (Season 6, Episode 14) (December 19, 1984)
  - "Christmas Baby" (Season 7, Episode 13) (December 14, 1985)
  - "It's a Wonderful Christmas" (Season 9, Episode 10) (December 12, 1987)
- Fair Exchange
  - " 'Twas the Fortnight Before Christmas" (Season 1, Episode 14) (December 21, 1962)
- 1966
  - "Christmas Came a Little Early" (Season 3, Episode 7) (1968)
- 2002
  - "Holiday Fever" (Season 1, Episode 11) (December 5, 2002
- Family Matters
  - "Have Yourself a Very Winslow Christmas" (Season 2, Episode 13) (December 21, 1990)
  - "It's Beginning to Look a Lot Like Urkel" (Season 4, Episode 12) (December 11, 1992)
  - Christmas Is Where the Heart Is (Season 5, Episode 11) (December 10, 1993)
  - "Miracle on Elm Street" (Season 6, Episode 11) (December 16, 1994)
  - "Fa La La La Laaagghh!" (Season 7, Episode 11) (December 15, 1995)
  - "It Came Upon a Midnight Clear" (Season 8, Episode 13) (December 13, 1996)
  - "Deck the Malls" (Season 9, Episode 11) (December 19, 1997)
- Family Reunion
  - "A Family Reunion Christmas" (December 9, 2019)
- Family Ties
  - "A Christmas Story" (Season 1, Episode 11) (December 15, 1982)
  - "A Keaton Christmas Carol" (Season 2, Episode 9) (December 14, 1983)
  - "Miracle in Columbus" (Season 6, Episode 17) (December 20, 1987)
- Family Time
  - "Merry Kwanzaa" (Season 4, Episode 12) (December 20, 2016)
  - "Secret Stallworth" (Season 5, Episode 13) (December 18, 2017)
  - "Scrooge" (Season 6, Episode 13) (December 17, 2018)
  - "Christmas Beyond The Walls" (Season 8, Episode 12) (December 20, 2020)
- The Famous Teddy Z
  - "Season's Greetings from Al Floss" (Season 1, Episode 11) (December 11, 1989)
- The Fanelli Boys
  - "A Fanelli Christmas" (Season 1, Episode 11) (December 8, 1990)
- Father Knows Best
  - "The Christmas Story" (Season 1, Episode 12) (December 19, 1954)
  - "The Angel's Sweater" (Season 3, Episode 15) (December 19, 1956)
  - "Home for Christmas" (1977 - reunion special)
- First Time Out
  - "O Christmas Tree" (Season 1, Episode 12) (December 17, 1995)
- Flo
  - "The Miracle of Casa de Huevos" (Season 2, Episode 9) (December 22, 1980)
- The Flying Nun
  - "Wailing in a Winter Wonderland" (Season 1, Episode 17) (December 21, 1967)
- For Your Love
  - "The Married Little Christmas" (Season 5, Episode 9) (2002)
- The Four Seasons
  - "Trento" (Season 2, Episode 7) (2026)
  - "Maratona" (Season 2, Episode 8) (2026)
- Frasier
  - "Miracle on Third or Fourth Street" (Season 1, Episode 12) (December 16, 1993)
  - "Frasier Grinch" (Season 3, Episode 9) (December 19, 1995)
  - "Perspectives on Christmas" (Season 5, Episode 9) (December 16, 1997)
  - "Merry Christmas, Mrs. Moskowitz" (Season 6, Episode 10) (December 17, 1998)
  - "The Fight Before Christmas" (Season 7, Episode 11) (December 16, 1999)
  - "Mary Christmas" (Season 8, Episode 8) (December 12, 2000)
  - "We Two Kings" (Season 10, Episode 10) (December 10, 2002)
  - "High Holidays" (Season 11, Episode 11) (December 9, 2003)
- Frasier (2023)
  - "Reindeer Games" (Season 1, Episode 10) (December 7, 2023)
  - "Father Christmas" (Season 2, Episode 7) (November 14, 2024)
- Freddie
  - "I'll Be Homeless For Christmas" (Season 1, Episode 9) (December 14, 2005)
- Fresh Off the Boat
  - "The Real Santa" (December 8, 2015) (Season 2, Episode 10)
  - "Where are the Giggles?" (December 13, 2016) (Season 3, Episode 8)
  - "Do You Hear What I Hear?" (December 12, 2017) (Season 4, Episode 10)
  - "Cousin Eddie" (December 14, 2018) (Season 5, Episode 6)
  - "Jessica Town" (December 13, 2019) (Season 6, Episode 10)
- The Fresh Prince of Bel-Air
  - "Deck the Halls" (Season 1, Episode 15) (December 10, 1990)
  - "Will's Christmas Show" (Season 2, Episode 13) (December 16, 1991)
  - 'Twas the Night Before Christenin" (Season 4, Episode 13) (December 20, 1993)
  - "I, Oooh, Baby, Baby" (Season 6, Episode 11) (December 11, 1995)
- Friends / Joey
  - Friends
    - "The One with the Monkey" (Season 1, Episode 10) (December 15, 1994)
    - "The One with Phoebe's Dad" (Season 2, Episode 9) (December 14, 1995)
    - "The One Where Rachel Quits" (Season 3, Episode 10) (December 12, 1996)
    - "The One with the Girl from Poughkeepsie" (Season 4, Episode 10) (December 18, 1997)
    - "The One with the Inappropriate Sister" (Season 5, Episode 10) (December 17, 1998)
    - "The One with the Routine" (Season 6, Episode 10) (December 16, 1999)
    - "The One with All the Candy" (Season 7, Episode 9) (December 7, 2000)
    - "The One with the Holiday Armadillo" (Season 7, Episode 10) (December 14, 2000)
    - "The One with Monica's Boots" (Season 8, Episode 10) (December 6, 2001)
    - "The One With Ross' Step Forward" (Season 8, Episode 11) (December 13, 2001)
    - "The One with Christmas in Tulsa" (Season 9, Episode 10) (December 12, 2002)
  - Joey
    - "Joey and the Plot Twist" (Season 1, Episode 12) (December 9, 2004)
    - "Joey and the Tijuana Trip" (Season 2, Episode 12) (December 15, 2005)
    - "Joey and the Christmas Party" (Season 2, Episode 13) (December 15, 2005)
    - "Joey and the Snowball Fight" (Season 2, Episode 14) (March 7, 2005)
- Full House / Fuller House
  - Full House
    - "Our Very First Christmas Show" (Season 2, Episode 9) (December 16, 1988)
    - "Aftershocks" (Season 3, Episode 11) (December 8, 1989)
    - "A Very Tanner Christmas" (Season 6, Episode 12) (December 15, 1992)
    - "The Perfect Couple" (Season 7, Episode 13) (December 14, 1993)
    - "Arrest Ye Merry Gentlemen" (Season 8, Episode 11) (December 13, 1994)
  - Fuller House
    - "Nutcrackers" (Season 2, Episode 12) (December 9, 2016)
    - "Oh, My Santa!" (Season 4, Episode 1) (December 14, 2018)
- The Game
  - "There's No Place Like Home" (Season 1, Episode 10) (December 11, 2006)
  - "The Ghost of Derwin Past" (Season 2, Episode 10) (December 10, 2007)
- The Geena Davis Show
  - "How the Mom Stole Christmas" (Season 1, Episode 10) (December 19, 2000)
- George and Leo
  - "The Eggnog" (Season 1, Episode 13) (December 15, 1997)
- George Burns
  - The George Burns Show
    - "A Wife for Christmas" (Season 1, Episode 9) (December 23, 1958)
  - The George Burns and Gracie Allen Show
    - "Gracie's Christmas" (Season 1, Episode 6) (December 21, 1950)
    - "Christmas with Mamie Kelly" (Season 2, Episode 7) (December 20, 1951)
    - "Company for Christmas" (Season 6, Episode 12) (December 19, 1955)
    - "Christmas in Jail" (Season 7, Episode 16) (December 24, 1956)
    - "How to Wrap a Mink" (Season 8, Episode 13) (December 23, 1957)
  - George Burns Comedy Week
    - "Christmas Carol II - The Sequel" (Season 1, Episode 12) (December 11, 1985)
- George Lopez
  - "Meet the Cuban Parents" (Season 2, Episode 11) (December 11, 2002)
  - "Christmas Punch" (Season 3, Episode 12) (December 12, 2003)
  - "A Clear and Presentless Danger" (Season 4, Episode 10) (December 14, 2004)
  - "George Is Being Elfish and Christ-misses His Family" (Season 5, Episode 11) (December 14, 2005)
- Getting Together
  - "Blue Christmas" (Season 1, Episode 11) (December 18, 1971)
- Ghosts
  - "The Christmas Spirit" (2-part episode) (December 15, 2022) (Season 2, Episode 9)
  - "A Very Arondekar Christmas" (2-part episode) (December 19, 2024) (Season 4, Episode 8)
  - "It's a Wonderful Christmas Carol" (2-part episode) (December 18, 2025) (Season 5, Episode 9–10)
  - "Died Hard: A Ghosts Christmas Special" (2-part episode) (December 10, 2026) (Season 6, Episode 3-4)
- The Ghost and Mrs. Muir
  - "The Ghost and Christmas Past" (Season 2, Episode 14) (December 25, 1969)
- Gilligan's Island
  - "Birds Gotta Fly, Fish Gotta Talk" (Season 1, Episode 12) (December 19, 1964)
- Gimme a Break!
  - "A Kanisky Christmas" (Season 3, Episode 10) (December 22, 1983)
  - "The Spirit of Christmas" (Season 4, Episode 13) (December 22, 1984)
  - "Snippets" (Season 5, Episode 13) (December 14, 1985)
  - "Christmas in New York" (Season 6, Episode 12) (December 10, 1986)
- Girlboss
  - "Garbage Person" (2017) (Season 1, Episode 11)
- Girlfriends
  - "You Better Watch Out" (Season 2, Episode 11) (December 17, 2001)
  - "Santa v. Monica" (Season 3, Episode 11) (December 16, 2002)
  - "Merry Ex-mas" (Season 4, Episode 11) (December 15, 2003)
  - "All the Creatures Were Stirring" (Season 5, Episode 11) (December 13, 2004)
  - "All God's Children" (Season 6, Episode 11) (December 12, 2005)
  - "I'll Have a Blue Line Christmas" (Season 7, Episode 10) (December 11, 2006)
  - "Deck the Halls with Bags and Folly" (Season 8, Episode 10) (December 10, 2007)
- Going Dutch
  - "Once Upon a Twice Christmas" (Season 1, Episode 7) (2025)
- The Goldbergs / Schooled
  - The Goldbergs
    - "A Christmas Story" (December 9, 2015) (Season 3, Episode 10)
    - "Han Ukkah Solo" (December 14, 2016) (Season 4, Episode 10)
    - "We Didn't Start the Fire" (December 13, 2017) (Season 5, Episode 10)
    - "Yippee Ki Yay Melon Farmer" (December 12, 2018) (Season 7, Episode 10)
    - "It's a Wonderful Life" (December 11, 2019) (Season 7, Episode 10)
    - "Hanukkah On the Seas" (December 2, 2020) (Season 8, Episode 7)
    - "Worst Grinch Ever" (December 7, 2022) (Season 10, Episode 10)
  - Schooled
    - "Beanie Babies" (December 11, 2019) (Season 2, Episode 10)
- The Golden Girls / The Golden Palace
  - " 'Twas the Nightmare Before Christmas" (Season 2, Episode 11) (December 20, 1986)
  - "Have Yourself a Very Little Christmas" (Season 5, Episode 12) (December 16, 1989)
- The Golden Palace
  - It's Beginning to Look a Lot (Less) Like Christmas (Season 1, Episode 12) (December 18, 1992)
- Good Times
  - "Sometimes There's No Bottom in the Bottle" (Season 2, Episode 13) (December 10, 1974)
  - "Penny's Christmas" (Season 5, Episode 10) (December 21, 1977)
  - "The Traveling Christmas" (Season 6, Episode 8) (December 20, 1978)
- Good Morning, Miami
  - "Jake's Nuts Roasting on an Open Fire" (Season 1, Episode 12) (2003)
- Good News
  - "A Christmas Story" (Season 1, Episode 13) (December 16, 1997)
- Goodnight, Beantown
  - "Peace on Earth" (Season 2, Episode 10) (December 25, 1983)
- Go On
  - "The World Ain't Over 'Till It's Over" (December 4, 2012) (Season 1, Episode 11)
- Grace Under Fire
  - "Keeping Faith" (Season 1, Episode 11) (December 15, 1993)
  - "The Holidays" (Season 2, Episode 12) (December 13, 1994)
  - "Emmett, We Hardly Knew Ye" (Season 3, Episode 12) (December 20, 1995)
  - "A Holly, Jolly Christmas" (Season 4, Episode 12) (December 18, 1996)
  - "Mother Christmas" (Season 5, Episode 4) (December 16, 1997)
- Great News
  - "A Christmas Carol Wendelson" (December 21, 2017) (Season 2, Episode 7)
- Green Acres
  - "An Old Fashioned Christmas" (Season 2, Episode 13) (December 21, 1966)
- Greetings from Tucson
  - "Christmas" (Season 1, Episode 9) (December 13, 2002)
- Grindl
  - " 'Twas the Week Before Christmas" (Season 1, Episode 13) (December 22, 1963)
- Grounded for Life
  - "I Saw Daddy Hitting Santa Claus" (Season 2, Episode 7) (December 19, 2001)
- Growing Pains
  - "A Christmas Story" (Season 1, Episode 12) (December 10, 1985)
  - "The Kid" (Season 2, Episode 9) (December 16, 1986)
  - "It's Not Easy Being Green" (Season 7, Episode 13) (December 21, 1991)
- Guys with Kids
  - "Christmas" (Season 1, Episode 10) (December 5, 2012)
- Half & Half
  - "The Big How the Ex Stole Christmas Episode" (Season 2, Episode 11) (December 15, 2003)
  - "The Big Sweet Smell Of Excess Episode" (Season 4, Episode 11) (December 12, 2005)
- Hang Time
  - "Christmas in New York" (Season 4, Episode 25) (December 5, 1998)
- Hangin' with Mr. Cooper
  - "Miracle in Oaktown" (Season 1, Episode 10) (December 15, 1992)
  - "Santa's Got a Brand New Bag" (Season 2, Episode 11) (December 10, 1993)
  - "Christmas Show" (Season 3, Episode 12) (December 16, 1994)
  - "Christmas '95" (Season 4, Episode 11) (December 15, 1995)
- Happy Days
  - "Guess Who's Coming to Christmas" (Season 2, Episode 11) (December 17, 1974)
  - "Tell It to the Marines" (Season 3, Episode 15) (December 16, 1975)
  - "Richie Branches Out" (Season 4, Episode 11) (December 7, 1976)
  - "Christmas Time" (Season 6, Episode 16) (December 19, 1978)
  - "White Christmas" (Season 8, Episode 6) (December 16, 1980)
  - "All I Want for Christmas" (Season 10, Episode 10) (December 14, 1982)
- Happy Endings
  - "Grinches Be Crazy" (December 7, 2011) (Season 2, Episode 9)
  - "No-Ho-Ho" (December 18, 2012) (Season 3, Episode 7)
- Happy Hour
  - "A Dead Man's Ham" (Season 1, Episode 12) (2006)
- Happy's Place
  - "Ho-Ho-Howey" (Season 1, Episode 7) (December 6, 2024)
- Harper Valley PTA
  - "I'm Dreaming of a Harper Valley Christmas" (Season 2, Episode 6) (December 19, 1981)
- Hazel
  - "Hazel's Christmas Shopping" (Season 1, Episode 12) (December 21, 1961)
  - "Just 86 Shopping Minutes to Christmas" (Season 4, Episode 15) (December 24, 1964)
- Head of the Class
  - "Viki's Torn Genes" (Season 5, Episode 15) (December 18, 1990)
- Hearts Afire
  - "Everyday's a Holiday" (Season 1, Episode 12) (December 21, 1992)
  - "Blue Christmas" (Season 2, Episode 8) (December 15, 1993)
  - "The Perfect Christmas" (Season 3, Episode 9) (December 10, 1994)
- Hennesey
  - "The Christmas Show" (Season 1, Episode 12) (December 21, 1959)
  - "Santa Hits Harvey" (Season 3, Episode 13) (December 25, 1961)
- Herman's Head
  - "A Charlie Brown Fitzer" (Season 2, Episode 13) (December 20, 1992)
- Hidden Hills
  - "Christmas" (Season 1, Episode 10) (December 10, 2002)
- The Hogan Family
  - "Ho, Ho, Hogans" (Season 6, Episode 13) (1991)
- Home Economics
  - "Secret Santa List, $25 Limit" (December 1, 2021) (Season 2, Episode 9)
  - "Santa Suit Rental, $25 Per Day" (December 7, 2022) (Season 3, Episode 10)
- Home Improvement
  - "Yule Better Watch Out" (Season 1, Episode 12) (December 17, 1991)
  - "I'm Scheming of a White Christmas" (Season 2, Episode 12) (December 16, 1992)
  - " 'Twas the Blight Before Christmas" (Season 3, Episode 12) (December 15, 1993)
  - "Some Like It Hot Rod" (Season 4, Episode 11) (December 6, 1994)
  - " 'Twas the Night Before Chaos" (Season 4, Episode 12) (December 13, 1994)
  - " 'Twas the Flight Before Christmas" (Season 5, Episode 12) (December 12, 1995)
  - "No Place Like Home" (Season 6, Episode 12) (December 17, 1996)
  - "Bright Christmas" (Season 7, Episode 11) (December 16, 1997)
  - "Home for the Holidays" (Season 8, Episode 11) (December 8, 1998)
- The Honeymooners
  - " 'Twas the Night Before Christmas" (Season 1, Episode 13) (December 24, 1955)
- Hope & Faith
  - "Silent Night, Opening Night" (Season 1, Episode 11) (December 12, 2003)
  - "Aru-Bah Humbug" (Season 2, Episode 12) (December 17, 2004)
  - "Christmas Time" (Season 3, Episode 11) (December 13, 2005)
- Hope & Gloria
  - "The Dupree Family Christmas" (Season 2, Episode 10) (December 17, 1995)
- Hot in Cleveland
  - "Cold in Cleveland: The Christmas Episode" (Season 6, Episode 7) (December 17, 2014)
- House Calls
  - "Kensington Follies" (Season 2, Episode 5) (December 15, 1980)
- Tyler Perry's House of Payne
  - "The Wench Who Saved Christmas" (Season 2, Episode 40) (December 5, 2007)
  - "Oh, Christmas Payne" (Season 4, Episode 9) (December 9, 2009)
- How I Met Your Mother
  - "How Lily Stole Christmas" (Season 2, Episode 11) (December 11, 2006)
  - "Little Minnesota" (Season 4, Episode 11) (December 15, 2008)
  - "The Window" (Season 5, Episode 10) (December 7, 2009)
  - "Last Cigarette Ever" (Season 5, Episode 11) (December 14, 2009)
  - "False Positive" (Season 6, Episode 12) (December 13, 2010)
  - "Symphony of Illumination" (Season 7, Episode 12) (December 5, 2011)
  - "The Final Page" (Season 8, Episodes 11–12) (December 17, 2012)
- Hudson Street
  - "Saturday Night's the Loneliest Night of the Week" (Season 1, Episode 12) (December 19, 1995)
- The Hughleys
  - "A Multi-Culti Christmas" (Season 1, Episode 12) (December 15, 1998)
  - "Miracle on 135th and Avalon" (Season 2, Episode 11) (December 17, 1999)
  - "I'm Dreaming of a Slight Christmas" (Season 4, Episode 12) (December 17, 2001)
- I Love Lucy
  - "The I Love Lucy Christmas Special" (Season 6, Episode 11) (1956)
- I'm a Big Girl Now
  - "The First Christmas" (Season 1, Episode 7) (December 19, 1980)
- I'm with Her
  - "The Greatest Christmas Story Ever Told" (Season 1, Episode 10) (December 23, 2003)
- In the House
  - "Christmas Story" (Season 2, Episode 12) (December 11, 1995)
  - "God Is in the House" (Season 4, Episode 13) (December 16, 1997)
- In-Laws
  - "Married Christmas" (Season 1, Episode 12) (December 3, 2002)
- It's All Relative
  - "The Santa That Came to Dinner" (Season 1, Episode 11) (December 17, 2003)
- It's Always Sunny in Philadelphia
  - "A Very Sunny Christmas" (December 16, 2010) (Season 6, Episodes 13–14)
- It's Garry Shandling's Show
  - "It's Garry Shandling's Christmas Show" (Season 2, Episode 8) (December 17, 1988)
- It's Your Move
  - "The Christmas Show" (Season 1, Episode 11) (December 19, 1984)
- The Jamie Foxx Show
  - "Christmas Day-Ja Vu" (Season 3, Episode 10) (December 17, 1998)
- The Jeff Foxworthy Show
  - "He's Making a List, Checking It Twice" (Season 1, Episode 9) (1995)
  - "Merry Christmas, Y'all" (Season 2, Episode 10) (December 18, 1996)
- The Jeffersons
  - "The Christmas Wedding" (Season 3, Episode 12) (December 22, 1976)
  - "984 W. 124th Street, Apt. 5C" (Season 4, Episode 15) (December 24, 1977)
  - "George Finds a Father" (Season 5, Episode 12) December 20, 1978)
  - "All I Want for Christmas" (Season 7, Episode 8) (December 21, 1980)
  - "Father Christmas" (Season 10, Episode 10) (December 11, 1983)
- Jenny
  - "A Girl's Gotta Deck the Halls" (Season 1, Episode 7) (December 15, 1997)
- Jesse
  - "The Christmas Party" (Season 2, Episode 9) (December 16, 1999)
- Joanie Loves Chachi
  - "Christmas Show" (Season 2, Episode 11) (December 16, 1982)
- Joe's Life
  - "Yule Be Sorry" (Season 1, Episode 11) (December 15, 1993)
- The Joey Bishop Show
  - "Baby's First Christmas" (Season 3, Episode 13) (December 21, 1963)
- Julia
  - "I'm Dreaming of a Black Christmas" Season 1, Episode 14) (December 17, 1968)
- Just Shoot Me!
  - "Jesus, It's Christmas" (Season 2, Episode 9) (December 16, 1997)
  - "How the Finch Stole Christmas" (Season 3, Episode 10) (December 15, 1998)
  - "Christmas? Christmas!" (Season 6, Episode 9) (December 13, 2001)
- Just the Ten of Us
  - "A Christmas Story" (Season 2, Episode 8) (December 16, 1988)
- Kate & Allie
  - "The Nightmare Before Christmas" (Season 5, Episode 12) (December 14, 1987)
- Kath & Kim
  - "Friends" (December 11, 2008) (Season 1, Episode 9)
- Kenan
  - "Christmas" (December 15, 2021) (Season 2, Episode 1)
- Kentucky Jones
  - "Ho, Ho, Ho" (Season 1, Episode 11) (December 19, 1964)
- Kevin Can Wait
  - "I'll Be Home for Christmas... Maybe" (Season 1, Episode 12) (December 12, 2016)
  - "The Might've Before Christmas" (Season 2, Episode 12) (December 18, 2017)
- The Kids Are Alright
  - "Christmas 1972" (December 11, 2018) (Season 1, Episode 8)
- The King of Queens
  - "Noel Cowards" (Season 1, Episode 11) (December 14, 1998)
  - "Net Prophets" (Season 2, Episode 12) (December 13, 1999)
  - "Better Camera" (Season 3, Episode 11) (December 11, 2000)
  - "Ovary Action" (Season 4, Episode 12) (December 17, 2001)
  - "Mentalo Case" (Season 5, Episode 11) (December 16, 2002)
  - "Santa Claustrophobia" (Season 6, Episode 11) (December 17, 2003)
  - "Silent Mite" (Season 7, Episode 7) (December 15, 2004)
  - "Baker's Doesn't" (Season 8, Episode 11) (December 19, 2005)
- Kirk
  - "The Christmas Show" (Season 1, Episode 12) (December 10, 1995)
- Ladies Man
  - "Aloha Christmas" (Season 1, Episode 12) (December 13, 1999)
- The Last Man on Earth
  - "Secret Santa" (December 6, 2015) (Season 2, Episode 9)
  - "Silent Night" (December 13, 2015) (Season 2, Episode 10)
- Last Man Standing
  - "Last Christmas Standing" (Season 1, Episode 10) (December 6, 2011)
  - "Putting a Hit on Christmas" (Season 2, Episode 7) (December 14, 2012)
  - "Elfie" (Season 3, Episode 11) (December 13, 2013)
  - "Wedding Planning" (Season 4, Episode 11) (December 12, 2014)
  - "Gift of the Wise Man" (Season 5, Episode 11) (December 11, 2015)
  - "My Name Is Rob" (Season 6, Episode 11) (December 16, 2016)
  - "The Gift of the Mike Guy" (Season 7, Episode 9) (December 14, 2018)
- Laverne & Shirley
  - "Oh Hear the Angels' Voices" (Season 2, Episode 10) (December 21, 1976)
  - "O Come All Ye Bums" (Season 4, Episode 14) (December 19, 1978)
  - "Friendly Persuasion" (Season 7, Episode 9) (December 15, 1981)
- The League
  - "The Usual Bet" (December 3, 2009) (Season 1)
  - "Kegel the Elf" (December 9, 2010) (Season 2, Episode 12)
  - "A Krampus Carol" (December 20, 2012) (Season 4, Episode 12)
- Leave It to Beaver
  - "The Haircut" (Season 1, Episode 4) (1957)
- Less Than Perfect
  - "One Office Party Too Many" (Season 1, Episode 10) (December 10, 2002)
  - "Santa Claude" (Season 2, Episode 12) (December 16, 2003)
  - "Claude's 15 Minutes of Christmas" (Season 3, Episode 11) (December 17, 2004)
- Life in Pieces
  - "College Stealing Santa Caroling" (December 17, 2015) (Season 1, Episode 11)
  - "Window Vanity Dress Grace" (December 15, 2016) (Season 2, Episode 8)
  - "The Twelve Shorts of Christmas" (December 21, 2017) (Season 3, Episode 8)
- Life with Bonnie
  - "Christmastime in the City" (Season 1, Episode 12) (December 10, 2002)
  - "It's a Wonderful Job" (Season 2, Episode 11) (December 12, 2003)
- Life's Work
  - "Fired" (Season 1, Episode 12) (December 17, 1996)
- The Little People
  - "The Christmas Pageant" (Season 1, Episode 14) (December 22, 1972)
- Living Single
  - "Living Kringle" (Season 1, Episode 15) (December 19, 1993)
  - "Let It Snow, Let It Snow, Let It Snow...Dammit" (Season 3, Episode 13) (December 14, 1995)
  - "Doctor in the House" (Season 4, Episode 12) (December 19, 1996)
- Lopez vs Lopez
  - "Lopez vs. Christmas" (Season 1, Episode 6) (December 16, 2022)
  - "Lopez vs. Santa" (Season 3, Episode 7) (December 6, 2024)
- Love That Girl!
  - " 'Twas the Storm Before Christmas" (Season 3, Episode 11) (December 19, 2011)
  - "Happy Hold Up Day" (Season 4, Episode 9) (December 6, 2013)
- Love, American Style
  - "Love and the Christmas Punch" (Season 4, Episode 10) (1972)
- Love & War
  - "A Christmas Kvell" (Season 1, Episode 12) (December 14, 1992)
- The Love Boat
  - "Lonely at the Top/Divorce Me, Please/Silent Night" (Season 1, Episode 11) (December 10, 1977)
  - "The Captain's Bird/That's My Dad/Captive Audience" (Season 4, Episode 11) (December 20, 1980)
  - "A Christmas Presence" (Season 6, Episode 13) (December 18, 1982)
  - "Santa, Santa, Santa/Another Dog-Gone Christmas/Noel's Christmas Carol" (Season 8, Episode 16) (December 15, 1984)
  - "The Christmas Cruise" (Season 10, Episodes 2, 3, & 4) (December 25, 1986)
- The Lucy Show
  - "Together for Christmas" (Season 1, Episode 13) (December 24, 1962)
  - "Lucy the Choirmaster" (Season 4, Episode 13) (December 13, 1965)
- Mad About You
  - "Met Someone" (Season 1, Episode 11) (December 16, 1992)
- Madman of the People
  - "It's a Mad, Mad, Mad, Mad Christmas" (Season 1, Episode 12) (December 15, 1994)
- Major Dad
  - "The Gift of the Major" (Season 2, Episode 12) (December 17, 1990)
- Make Room for Daddy / The Danny Thomas Show
  - "Christmas" (Season 1, Episode 13) (December 22, 1953)
  - "Christmas and Clowns" (Season 4, Episode 13) (December 24, 1956)
  - "Christmas Story" (Season 11, Episode 12) (December 23, 1963)
- Malcolm in the Middle
  - "Christmas" (December 16, 2001) (Season 3, Episode 7)
  - "Christmas Trees" (December 14, 2003) (Season 5, Episode 7)
  - "Hal's Christmas Gift" (December 19, 2004) (Season 6, Episode 6)
- Malibu Country
  - "Merry Malibu Christmas" (Season 1, Episode 7) (December 14, 2012)
- Mama
  - "The Night the Animals Talked" (Season 3, Episode 16) (1953)
- Mama's Family
  - "Santa Mama" (Season 3, Episode 13) (December 20, 1986)
  - "Mama Gets Goosed" (Season 6, Episode 14) (December 23, 1989)
- Man with a Plan
  - "Winter Has Come" (Season 1, Episode 7) (December 12, 2016)
- Man vs. Baby
  - (2025)
- The Many Loves of Dobie Gillis
  - "Deck the Halls" (Season 1, Episode 12) (December 22, 1959)
  - "Jangle Bells" (Season 2, Episode 10) (December 20, 1960)
  - "Have Reindeer, Will Travel" (Season 3, Episode 11) (December 19, 1961)
  - "Will the Real Santa Claus Please Come Down the Chimney?" (Season 4, Episode 13) (December 19, 1962)
- Married to the Kellys
  - "A Kelly Carol" (Season 1, Episode 10) (December 12, 2003)
- Married... with Children
  - "You Better Watch Out" (Season 2, Episode 13) (December 20, 1987)
  - "It's a Bundyful Life" (Season 4, Episodes 11–12) (December 17, 1989)
  - "Christmas" (Season 7, Episode 12) (December 20, 1992)
  - "The Worst Noel" (Season 8, Episode 13) (December 19, 1993)
  - "I Can't Believe It's Butter" (Season 10, Episode 14) (December 17, 1995)
  - "God Help Ye Merry Bundymen" (Season 11, Episode 8) (December 22, 1996)
- Martin
  - "I Saw Gina Kissing Santa Claus" (Season 1, Episode 15) (December 17, 1992)
  - "Holiday Blues" (Season 2, Episode 15) (December 19, 1993)
  - "Go Tell It on the Martin" (Season 3, Episode 13) (December 15, 1994)
  - "Swing Thing" (Season 4, Episode 13)(December 17, 1995)
  - "Scrooge" (Season 5, Episode 10) (December 19, 1996)
- Mary Hartman, Mary Hartman
  - "Episode 190" (Season 2, Episode 190) (1977)
- The Mary Tyler Moore Show
  - "Christmas and the Hard Luck Kid II" (Season 1, Episode 14) (December 19, 1970)
  - "Not a Christmas Story" (Season 5, Episode 9) (November 9, 1974)
- Maude
  - "The Office Party" (Season 2, Episode 14) (December 18, 1973)
  - "The Christmas Party" (Season 4, Episode 14) (December 22, 1975)
  - "Walter's Christmas Gift" (Season 5, Episode 13) (December 20, 1976)
  - "Maude's Christmas Surprise" (Season 6, Episode 11) (December 19, 1977)
- The Mayor
  - "Grey Christmas" (Season 1, Episode 9) (December 12, 2017)
- McHale's Navy
  - "The Day They Captured Santa" (Season 1, Episode 11) (December 27, 1962)
- Me and the Boys
  - "Christmas Story" (Season 1, Episode 12) (December 13, 1994)
- Meego
  - "I Won't Be Home for Christmas" (Season 1, Episode 10) (1997)
- Meet Corliss Archer
  - "The Christmas Story" (Season 1, Episode 39) (1954)
- Tyler Perry's Meet the Browns
  - "Meet the Christmas Spirit" (Season 3, Episode 9) (December 9, 2009)
- Meet Mr. McNutley / The Ray Milland Show
  - "The Christmas Story" (Season 1, Episode 15) (December 24, 1953)
  - "Christmas Story" (Season 2, Episode 15) (December 23, 1954)
- Melissa & Joey
  - "A New Kind of Christmas" (Season 3, Episode 16) (December 11, 2013)
  - "A Melanie & Josiah Christmas" (Season 4, Episode 2) (December 10, 2014)
- Men Behaving Badly (American TV series)
  - "Christmas" (Season 1, Episode 10) (December 18, 1996)
  - "The Gift of Jami" (Season 2, Episode 6) (December 17, 1997)
- Merry Happy Whatever
  - (2019)
- The Michael J. Fox Show
  - "Christmas" (December 12, 2013) (Season 1, Episode 11)
- The Middle
  - "Christmas" (December 9, 2009) (Season 1, Episode 10)
  - "A Simple Christmas" (December 8, 2010) (Season 2, Episode 10)
  - "A Christmas Gift" (December 7, 2011) (Season 3, Episode 11)
  - "Christmas Help" (December 5, 2012) (Season 4, Episode 9)
  - "The Christmas Tree" (December 11, 2013) (Season 5, Episode 9)
  - "The Christmas Wall" (December 10, 2014) (Season 6, Episode 9)
  - "Not So Silent Night" (December 9, 2015) (Season 7, Episode 10)
  - "A Very Marry Christmas" (December 13, 2016) (Season 8, Episode 9)
  - "The Christmas Miracle" (December 12, 2017) (Season 9, Episode 10)
- Mike & Molly
  - "First Christmas" (Season 1, Episode 12) (December 13, 2010)
  - "Christmas Break" (Season 2, Episode 11) (December 12, 2011)
  - "Karaoke Christmas" (Season 3, Episode 10) (December 17, 2012)
  - " 'Tis the Season to Be Molly" (Season 5, Episode 3) (December 22, 2014)
- The Millers
  - "Carols Parents Are Coming to Town" (Season 1, Episode 10) (December 12, 2013)
  - "Highway To The Manger Zone" (Season 2, Episode 9) (July 18, 2015)
- Minor Adjustments
  - "A Christmas Story" (Season 1, Episode 20) (1996)
- A Minute with Stan Hooper
  - "Bye, Bye, Miss American Pie" (Season 1, Episode 6) (2003)
- The Mindy Project
  - "Josh and Mindy's Christmas Party" (December 11, 2012) (Season 1, Episode 9)
  - "Christmas Party Sex Trap" (December 3, 2013) (Season 2, Episode 11)
  - "Christmas" (December 9, 2014) (Season 3, Episode 11)
  - "When Mindy Met Danny" (December 8, 2015) (Season 4, Episode 13)
- Mister Peepers
  - Season 3, Episode 14 (December 13, 1953)
  - Season 3, Episode 15 (December 20, 1953)
  - Season 4, Episode 11 (December 19, 1954)
- Mister Ed
  - "Ed's Christmas Story" (Season 4, Episode 12) (December 22, 1963)
- Modern Family
  - "Undeck the Halls" (December 9, 2009) (Season 1, Episode 10)
  - "Express Christmas" (December 7, 2011) (Season 3, Episode 10)
  - "The Old Man & the Tree" (December 11, 2013) (Season 5, Episode 10)
  - "White Christmas" (December 9, 2015) (Season 7, Episode 9)
  - "Snow Ball" (December 14, 20016) (Season 8, Episode 9)
  - "Stuck in a Moment" (December 12, 2018) (Season 10, Episode 10)
  - "The Last Christmas" (December 11, 2019) (Season 11, Episode 9)
- Moesha
  - "A Class Act Christmas" (Season 4, Episode 9) (December 15, 1998)
- The Mommies
  - "Christmas" (Season 1, Episode 12) (December 11, 1993)
- Mom
  - "Horny-Goggles and a Catered Intervention" (Season 3, Episode 6) (December 17, 2015)
  - "An Epi-Pen and a Security Cat" (Season 5, Episode 8) (December 21, 2017)
  - "Foot Powder and Five Feet of Vodka" (Season 6, Episode 11) (December 13, 2018)
  - "Higgledy-Piggledy and a Cat Show" (Season 7, Episode 10) (December 12, 2019)
- The Monkees
  - "The Christmas Show" (Season 2, Episode 15) (December 25, 1967)
- The Moodys
  - (2019 6-episode Christmas arc. Season 1)
- Mork & Mindy
  - "Mork's First Christmas" (Season 1, Episode 13) (December 14, 1978)
- Mr. Belvedere
  - "Christmas Story" (Season 4, Episode 8) (December 18, 1987)
  - "A Happy Guys' Christmas" (Season 6, Episode 11) (December 16, 1989)
- Mr. Mayor
  - "Mr. Mayor's Magical L.A. Christmas" (December 15, 2021) (Season 1, Episode 10)
- Mr. President
  - "The Christmas Story" (Season 2, Episode 10) (December 26, 1987)
- Mr. Rhodes
  - "The Christmas Show" (Season 1, Episode 11) (December 16, 1996)
- The Ms. Pat Show
  - "Father Christmas" (Season 3, Episode 10) (2023)
- Mulaney
  - "It's a Wonderful Home Alone" (Season 1, Episode 8) (December 21, 2014)
- The Munsters
  - "Grandpa Leaves Home" (Season 1, Episode 14) (December 24, 1964)
- The Muppets
  - "Single All the Way" (December 8, 2015) (Season 1, Episode 10)
- Murphy Brown
  - "Murphy's Pony" (Season 1, Episode 5) (December 11, 1988)
  - "Jingle Hell, Jingle Hell, Jingle All the Way" (Season 3, Episode 11) (December 17, 1990)
  - "I'm Dreaming of a Brown Christmas" (Season 5, Episode 12) (December 14, 1992)
  - "Brown in Toyland" (Season 7, Episode 12) (December 12, 1994)
- My Mother the Car
  - "Many Happy No-Returns" (Season 1, Episode 15) (December 21, 1965)
- My Name Is Earl
  - "White Lie Christmas" (December 6, 2005) (Season 1, Episode 10)
  - "Born a Gamblin' Man" (November 30, 2006) (Season 2, Episode 9)
  - "Bad Earl" (January 10, 2008) (Season 3, Episode 13)
  - "Orphan Earl" (December 11, 2008) (Season 4, Episode 13)
- My Sister Eileen
  - "Ebenezer Scrooge Appopolous" (Season 1, Episode 11) (December 21, 1960)
- My Sister Sam
  - "Jingle Bell Rock Bottom" (Season 1, Episode 10) (December 22, 1986)
- My World and Welcome to It
  - "Rally Round the Flag" (Season 1, Episode 14) (December 15, 1969)
- Mythic Quest
  - "The 12 Hours of Christmas" (December 9, 2022) (Season 3, Episode 6)
- My Two Dads
  - " 'Tis the Season" (Season 1, Episode 11) (December 20, 1987)
  - I'm Dreaming of a Holiday Episode (Season 3, Episode 10) (December 20, 1989)
- Mystery Science Theater 3000
  - "Santa Claus Conquers the Martians" (Season 3, Episode 21) (December 21, 1991)
  - "Santa Claus" (Season 5, Episode 21) (December 24, 1993)
  - "The Christmas That Almost Wasn't" (Season 11, Episode 13) (April 14, 2017)
  - "The Christmas Dragon" (Season 13, Episode 13) (December 16, 2022)
- The Naked Truth
  - "Sewer Gators, Swordplay, Santa from Hell!" (Season 1, Episode 12) (December 20, 1995)
- The Nanny
  - "Christmas Episode" (Season 1, Episode 8) (December 22, 1993)
  - "The Kibbutz" (Season 3, Episode 12) (December 4, 1995)
  - "Oy to the World" (Season 3, Episode 14) (December 18, 1995)
  - "Hurricane Fran" (Season 4, Episode 11) (December 18, 1996)
  - "The Hanukkah Story" (Season 6, Episode 10) (December 16, 1998)
- The Neighborhood
  - "Welcome to the Scooter" (Season 2, Episode 11) (December 16, 2019)
  - "Welcome to Secrets and Santa" (Season 8, Episode 8) (December 8, 2025)
- The Neighbors
  - "Merry Crap-Mas" (December 5, 2012) (Season 1, Episode 9)
  - "A Christmas Story" (December 13, 2013) (Season 2, Episode 11)
- Ned & Stacey
  - "Les Is More or Less Moral-less" (Season 2, Episode 5) (December 22, 1996)
- Neo Yokio
  - "Pink Christmas" (2017)
- New Girl
  - "The 23rd" (December 13, 2011) (Season 1, Episode 9)
  - "Santa" (December 11, 2012) (Season 2, Episode 11)
  - "LAXmas" (December 9, 2014) (Season 4, Episode 11)
  - "Christmas Eve Eve" (December 13, 2016) (Season 6, Episode 10)
- Newhart
  - "No Room at the Inn" (Season 1, Episode 9) (December 20, 1982)
  - "The Prodigal Darryl" (Season 3, Episode 21) (May 6, 1985)
- NewsRadio
  - "Xmas Story" (Season 2, Episode 10) (December 19, 1995)
  - "Christmas" (Season 3, Episode 10) (December 18, 1996)
  - "Stupid Holiday Charity Talent Show" (Season 4, Episode 8) (December 16, 1997)
- The New Addams Family
  - "Christmas With The Addams Family" (December 7, 1998) (Season 1, Episode 27)
- The New Adventures of Old Christine
  - "It's Beginning to Stink a Lot Like Christmas" (Season 5, Episode 11) (December 16, 2009)
- The New Dick Van Dyke Show
  - "The Jailbird" (Season 2, Episode 14) (December 24, 1972)
- The New Gidget
  - "A Christmas Curl" (Season 2, Episode 13) (December 17, 1987)
- The New Leave It to Beaver
  - "Home for Christmas" (Season 2, Episode 16) (December 22, 1986)
- The New Normal
  - "Baby Proofing" (December 4, 2012) (Season 1, Episode 11)
- Nikki
  - "The Crybaby Who Stole Christmas" (Season 1, Episode 9) (December 17, 2000)
- Night Court / Night Court
  - Night Court
    - "Santa Goes Downtown" (Season 1, Episode 2) (January 11, 1984)
    - "Let It Snow" (Season 5, Episode 11) (December 17, 1987)
    - "The Night Court Before Christmas" (Season 6, Episode 9) (December 21, 1988)
    - "Santa on the Lam" (Season 9, Episode 11) (December 11, 1991)
  - Night Court
    - "A Night Court Before Christmas" (Season 2, Episode 1) (December 23, 2023)
    - "Feliz NaviDead" (Season 3, Episode 4) (December 17, 2024)
- The Norm Show
  - "Norm vs. Christmas" (Season 2, Episode 12) (December 15, 1999)
- Normal, Ohio
  - "Just Another Normal Christmas" (Season 1, Episode 7) (December 13, 2000)
- Nurses
  - "The Shift of the Magi" (Season 3, Episode 11) (December 18, 1993)
- The Odd Couple (1970 TV series)
  - "Scrooge Gets an Oscar" (Season 1, Episode 12) (December 17, 1970)
- The Odd Couple (2015 TV series)
  - "Felix Navidad" (Season 3, Episode 8) (December 12, 2016)
- The Office
  - "Christmas Party" (December 8, 2005) (Season 2, Episode 10)
  - "A Benihana Christmas" (December 14, 2006) (Season 3, Episodes 10 & 11)
  - "Moroccan Christmas" (December 11, 2008) (Season 5, Episode 11)
  - "Secret Santa" (December 10, 2009) (Season 6, Episode 13)
  - "Classy Christmas" (December 9, 2010) (Season 7, Episodes 11 & 12)
  - "Christmas Wishes" (December 8, 2011) (Season 8, Episode 10)
  - "Dwight Christmas" (December 6, 2012) (Season 9, Episode 9)
- Oh, Grow Up
  - "The Parent Trap" (Season 1, Episode 9–10) (December 21, 1999)
- On Our Own
  - "All I Want for Christmas" (Season 1, Episode 12) (December 18, 1994)
- One Day at a Time
  - "Girl Talk" (Season 4, Episode 13) (December 25, 1978)
  - "Not a Creature Was Staying" (Season 9, Episode 9) (December 25, 1983)
- One on One
  - "Santa Baby" (Season 1, Episode 12) (December 17, 2001)
  - "Everybody Loves Whom?" (Season 2, Episode 11) (December 16, 2002)
  - "It's a Miserable Life" (Season 3, Episode 11) (December 16, 2003)
  - "It's Beginning to Look a Lot Like...Venice?" (Season 5, Episode 11) (December 12, 2005)
- Operation Petticoat
  - "I'm Dreaming of a Pink Christmas" (Season 1, Episode 12) (December 17, 1977)
- Our Miss Brooks
  - "Christmas Show 1952" (Season 1, Episode 13) (December 26, 1952)
  - "The Magic Tree" (Season 2, Episode 12) (December 25, 1953)
  - "Music Box Revue" (Season 4, Episode 11) (December 16, 1955)
- Out All Night
  - "The Three Wise Men" (Season 1, Episode 11) (December 17, 1992)
- The Adventures of Ozzie & Harriet
  - "The Boys Earn Some Christmas Money" (Season 1, Episode 12) (December 19, 1952)
  - "The Late Christmas Gift" (Season 1, Episode 13) (December 26, 1952)
  - "The Miracle" (Season 2, Episode 15) (December 25, 1953)
  - "The Lost Christmas Gift" (Season 3, Episode 10) (December 24, 1954)
  - "The Fruitcake" (Season 3, Episode 11) (January 7, 1955)
  - "Christmas in October" (Season 5, Episode 4) (October 24, 1956)
  - "A Busy Christmas" (Season 5, Episode 12) (December 19, 1956)
  - "The Day After Christmas" (Season 5, Episode 13) (December 26, 1956)
  - "The Christmas Tree Lot" (Season 6, Episode 11) (December 18, 1957)
  - "The Girl in the Emporium" (Season 9, Episode 12) (December 14, 1960)
  - "A Piano for the Fraternity" (Season 9, Episode 13) (December 21, 1960)
- The Parent 'Hood
  - "The Man Who Canceled Christmas" (Season 2, Episode 11) (December 20, 1995)
- The Parkers
  - "Secret Santa" (Season 3, Episode 11) (December 17, 2001)
- Parks and Recreation
  - "Christmas Scandal" (Season 2, Episode 12) (December 10, 2009)
  - "Citizen Knope" (Season 4, Episode 10) (December 8, 2011)
  - "Ron and Diane" (Season 5, Episode 9) (December 6, 2012)
- Partners
  - "Fourteen Minutes?" (Season 1, Episode 12) (December 11, 1995)
- The Partridge Family
  - "Don't Bring Your Guns to Town, Santa" (Season 2, Episode 13) (December 17, 1971)
- The Patty Duke Show
  - "Christmas Present" (Season 1, Episode 15) (December 25, 1963)
- Pearl
  - "Christmas Daze" (Season 1, Episode 12) (December 18, 1996)
- The People's Choice
  - "The Christmas Story" (Season 1, Episode 12) (December 4, 1955)
- Perfect Harmony
  - "Merry Jaxmas" (December 12, 2019) (Season 1, Episode 10)
- Perfect Strangers
  - "A Christmas Story" (Season 2, Episode 11) (December 17, 1986)
  - "The Gift of the Mypiot" (Season 4, Episode 9) (December 16, 1988)
- Pete and Gladys
  - "Christmas Shopping" (Season 2, Episode 12) (December 4, 1961)
- Petticoat Junction
  - "Cannonball Christmas" (Season 1, Episode 14) (December 24, 1963)
  - "The Santa Claus Special" (Season 4, Episode 13) (December 20, 1966)
- Phenom
  - "A Very Doolan Christmas" (Season 1, Episode 12) (December 14, 1993)
- Phyllis
  - "The Christmas Party" (Season 2, Episode 13) (December 20, 1976)
- Police Academy: The Series
  - "Shopping with the Enemy" (Season 1, Episode 11) (December 1, 1997)
- The Pride of the Family
  - "Christmas Story" (Season 1, Episode 12) (1953)
- Prince of Peoria
  - "A Christmas Moose Miracle" (December 17, 2018)
- The Pruitts of Southampton
  - "Santa Was a Lady" (Season 1, Episode 14) (December 14, 1966)
- Punky Brewster
  - "Yes, Punky, There Is a Santa Claus" (Season 1, Episodes 12 & 13) (December 16, 1984)
  - "Christmas Shoplifting" (Season 2, Episode 13) (December 15, 1985)
  - "Christmas Hero" (Season 4, Episode 7) (May 5, 1988)
- Quintuplets
  - "Bob and Carol Save Christmas" (Season 1, Episode 18) (December 15, 2004)
- Raising Hope
  - "Toy Story" (December 7, 2010) (Season 1, Episode 11)
  - "It's a Hopeful Life" (December 13, 2011) (Season 2, Episode 10)
  - "Last Christmas" (December 11, 2012) (Season 3, Episode 10)
  - "The Chance Who Stole Christmas" (December 13, 2013) (Season 4, Episode 9)
- The Ranch
  - "Merry Christmas (Wherever You Are)" (Season 1, Episode 20) (October 7, 2016)
  - "My Next Thirty Years" (Season 2, Episode 1) (June 16, 2017)
  - "Take My Home, Country Roads" (Season 4, Episode 20) (January 24, 2020)
- The Real McCoys
  - "The Diamond Ring" (Season 5, Episode 8) (1961)
- The Real O'Neals
  - "The Real Christmas" (December 13, 2016) (Season 2, Episode 8)
- Reba
  - "Cookies for Santa" (Season 2, Episode 10) (December 13, 2002)
- Rhoda
  - "Guess What I Got You for the Holidays" (Season 1, Episode 16) (December 16, 1974)
- The Rickey Smiley Show
  - "Captive Christmas" (Season 2, Episode 15) (December 13, 2013)
- Rocky Road
  - "Suzie Claus Is Coming to Town" () (1985)
- Rodney
  - "It's Up, It's Good" (Season 1, Episode 10) (December 7, 2004)
  - O Christmas Trees" (Season 2, Episode 7) (December 20, 2005)
- Roll Out
  - "Christmas of '44" (Season 1, Episode 10) (December 21, 1973)
- Roseanne / The Conners
  - Roseanne
    - "Santa Claus" (Season 4, Episode 12) (December 24, 1991)
    - "It's No Place Like Home for the Holidays" (Season 5, Episode 12) (December 15, 1992)
    - "White Trash Christmas" (Season 6, Episode 12) (December 14, 1993)
    - "The Parenting Trap" (Season 7, Episode 12) (December 14, 1994)
    - "December Bride" (Season 8, Episode 11) (December 12, 1995)
    - "Home for the Holidays" (Season 9, Episode 12) (December 17, 1996)
  - The Conners
    - "Smoking Penguins and Santa on Santa Action" (Season 2, Episode 9) (December 10, 2019)
    - "Yard Sale, Phone Fail, And a College Betrayal" (Season 4, Episode 8) (December 1, 2021)
    - "The Dog Days of Christmas" (Season 5, Episode 10) (December 7, 2022)
- The Ruggles
  - "Christmas Eve" (1951)
- Rules of Engagement
  - "Little Bummer Boy" (Season 5, Episode 12) (December 13, 2010)
- Sabrina the Teenage Witch
  - "A Girl and Her Cat" (Season 1, Episode 11) (December 13, 1996)
  - "Sabrina Claus" (Season 2, Episode 12) (December 19, 1997)
  - "Christmas Amnesia" (Season 3, Episode 11) (December 11, 1998)
  - "Sabrina, Nipping at Your Nose" (Season 4, Episode 12) (December 17, 1999)
  - "Sabrina's Perfect Christmas" (Season 5, Episode 10) (December 15, 2000)
  - "It's a Hot, Hot, Hot, Hot Christmas" (Season 7, Episode 9) (December 6, 2002)
- Sanford and Son
  - "Ebenezer Sanford" (Season 5, Episode 12) (December 12, 1975)
- Grady (spinoff of Sanford and Son)
  - "Merry Birthday, Happy Xmas" (Season 1, Episode 5) (December 18, 1975)
- Saved by the Bell / Saved by the Bell: The New Class
  - Saved by the Bell
    - "Home for Christmas" (Season 5, Episode 11–12) (December 7, 1991) (December 14, 1991)
  - Saved by the Bell: The New Class
    - "Christmas in July" (Season 2, Episode 12) (1994)
    - "The Christmas Gift" (Season 3, Episode 25) (December 9, 1995)
    - "Fire at the Max" (Season 4, Episode 25) (December 14, 1996)
    - "Seasons Greed-ings" (Season 6, Episode 13) (December 5, 1998)
- Scrubs
  - "My Own Personal Jesus" (December 13, 2001) (Season 1, Episode 11)
  - "My Monster" (December 12, 2002) (Season 2, Episode 10)
  - "My Best Moment" (December 7, 2003) (Season 4, Episode 12)
  - "My Wonderful Life" (December 9, 2026) (Season 2, Episode 10)
- Sean Saves the World
  - "Best Friends for Never" (Season 1, Episode 9) (December 12, 2013)
- The Second Hundred Years
  - "Luke's First Christmas" (Season 1, Episode 15) (December 20, 1967)
- Seinfeld
  - "The Red Dot" (Season 3, Episode 12) (December 11, 1991)
  - "The Pick" (Season 4, Episode 13) (December 16, 1992)
  - "The Race" (Season 6, Episode 10) (December 15, 1994)
  - "The Gum" (Season 7, Episode 10) (December 14, 1995)
  - "The Andrea Doria" (Season 8, Episode 10) (December 19, 1996)
  - "The Strike" (Season 9, Episode 10) (December 18, 1997)
- Shifting Gears
  - "Nutcracker" (Season 2, Episode 8) (December 10, 2025)
- Silver Spoons
  - "The Best Christmas Ever" (Season 1, Episode 13) (December 18, 1982)
  - " 'Twas the Night Before Christmas" (Season 3, Episode 11) (December 16, 1984)
- Simon
  - "You Can Run From Christmas, But You Can't Hide" (Season 1, Episode 12) (December 17, 1995)
- Single Parents
  - "The Magic Box" (December 12, 2018) (Season 1, Episode 10)
  - "Good Holidays to You" (December 11, 2019) (Season 2, Episode 10)
- Sister Kate
  - "Father Christmas" (Season 1, Episode 13) (December 17, 1989)
- Sister, Sister
  - "Christmas" (Season 3, Episode 12) (December 13, 1995)
- The Smothers Brothers Show
  - " 'Twas the Week Before Christmas" (Season 1, Episode 14) (December 17, 1965)
- So Little Time
  - "Outbreak" (Season 1, Episode 13) (December 1, 2001)
- Something So Right
  - "Something About a Christmas Miracle" (Season 1, Episode 11) (December 17, 1996)
- Something Wilder
  - "Gotta Dance" (Season 1, Episode 6) (1994)
- Son of Zorn
  - "The War on Grafelnik" (December 16, 2016) (Season 1, Episode 9)
- Soul Man
  - "Christmas Ruined My Life" (Season 1, Episode 9) (December 16, 1997)
- Sparks
  - "Silent Night" (Season 2, Episode 13) (December 16, 1997)
- Speechless
  - "C-h-o-Choir" (December 14, 2016) (Season 1, Episode 10)
  - "S-i-Silent Night" (December 13, 2017) (Season 2, Episode 10)
  - "J-i-Jingle T-H-Thon" (December 14, 2018) (Season 3, Episode 8)
- Spin City
  - "Criss Cross" (Season 1, Episode 12) (December 17, 1996)
  - "Miracle Near 34th Street" (Season 2, Episode 12) (December 17, 1997)
  - "Monkey Business" (Season 3, Episode 12) (December 15, 1998)
  - "My Dinner with Caitlin" (a.k.a. "Christmas 1999") (Season 4, Episode 12) (December 21, 1999)
  - "Toy Story" (Season 5, Episode 10) (December 20, 2000)
  - "An Office and a Gentleman" (Season 6, Episode 12) (December 11, 2001)
- Square Pegs
  - "A Child's Christmas in Weemawee" (Season 1, Episode 11-12) (December 20, 1982)
- St. Denis Medical
  - "Ho-Ho-Hollo" (December 17, 2024) (Season 1, Episode 6)
- Stanley
  - "Christmas Episode" (Season 1, Episode 20) (December 24, 1956)
- Stark Raving Mad
  - "Christmas Cheerleader" (Season 1, Episode 11) (December 16, 1999)
- Step by Step
  - "Christmas Story" (Season 3, Episode 11) (December 10, 1993)
  - "I'll Be Home for Christmas" (Season 4, Episode 12) (December 16, 1994)
  - "The Fight Before Christmas" (Season 5, Episode 11) (December 15, 1995)
  - "Too Many Santas" (Season 7, Episode 10) (December 19, 1997)
- Still Standing
  - "Still Christmas" (Season 2, Episode 10) (December 15, 2003)
  - "Still Avoiding Christmas" (Season 4, Episode 8) (December 14, 2005)
- Suburgatory
  - "The Nutcracker" (December 7, 2011) (Season 1, Episode 9)
  - "Krampus" (December 5, 2012) (Season 2, Episode 7)
- Suddenly Susan
  - "The Walk-Out" (Season 1, Episode 11) (December 19, 1996)
  - "Yule Never Know" (Season 2, Episode 11) (December 15, 1997)
  - "Merry Ex-mas" (Season 3, Episode 11) (December 14, 1998)
- Superior Donuts
  - "Homeless for the Holidays" (Season 2, Episode 7) (December 11, 2017)
- Superstore
  - "Seasonal Help" (December 14, 2016) (Season 2, Episode 9)
  - "Christmas Eve" (December 5, 2017) (Season 3, Episode
  - "Managers' Conference" (December 6, 2018) (Season 4, Episode 8)
  - "Negotiations" (December 12, 2019) (Season 5, Episode 10)
- Super Fun Night
  - "Merry Super Fun Christmas" (December 11, 2013) (Season 1, Episode 9)
- Svengoolie
  - "Abbott and Costello Meet the Invisible Man" (2006)
- Tacoma FD
  - "A Christmas Story" (2020) (Season 2, Episode 13)
- Taxi
  - "A Full House for Christmas" (Season 1, Episode 13) (December 12, 1978)
  - "Get Me Through the Holidays" (Season 5, Episode 12) (December 16, 1982)
- Team Kaylie]
  - "A Very Konrad Christmas" (Season 1, Episode 11) (December 2, 2019)
- Ted
  - "Loud Night" (2024) (Season 1, Episode 6)
- Teen Angel
  - "Living Doll" (Season 1, Episode 11) (December 19, 1997)
- Temperatures Rising
  - "Rx: Christmas" (Season 1, Episode 14) (December 19, 1972)
- That '70s Show
  - "The Best Christmas Ever" (Season 1, Episode 12) (December 13, 1998)
  - "Hyde's Christmas Rager" (Season 3, Episode 9) (December 19, 2000)
  - "An Eric Forman Christmas" (Season 4, Episode 12) (December 18, 2001)
  - "Christmas" (Season 6, Episode 7) (December 17, 2003)
  - "Winter" (Season 7, Episode 11) (December 15, 2004)
- That Girl
  - "Christmas and the Hard-Luck Kid" (Season 1, Episode 16) (December 22, 1966)
  - " 'Twas the Night Before Christmas, You're Under Arrest" (Season 2, Episode 15) (December 21, 1967)
- That's Life
  - " 'Twas the Night Before Christmas" (Season 1, Episode 12), "Our First Christmas" (Season 1, Episode 13) (1968)
- Thea
  - "A Christmas Story" (Season 1, Episode 12) (December 15, 1993)
- Three's Company
  - "Three's Christmas" (Season 2, Episode 14) (December 20, 1977)
- Throb
  - "One Christmas" (Season 2, Episode 12) (December 12, 1987)
- The Tony Danza Show
  - "A Christmas Story" (Season 1, Episode 11) (1998)
- The Tony Randall Show
  - "Case: O Come All Ye Wastrels" (Season 1, Episode 11) (December 23, 1976)
- 'Til Death
  - "No Complaints" (Season 4, Episode 4) (December 25, 2009)
- Titus
  - "The Last Noelle" (Season 2, Episode 9) (December 19, 2000)
  - "Houseboat" (Season 3, Episode 6) (December 19, 2001)
- Too Close for Comfort
  - "Mr. Christmas" (Season 3, Episode 11) (December 16, 1982)
- Topper
  - "A Christmas Carol" (Season 1, Episode 12) (December 25, 1953)
  - "Topper's Quiet Christmas" (Season 2, Episode 12) (December 24, 1954)
- Townies
  - "Christmas" (Season 1, Episode 11) (1996)
- The Tracy Morgan Show
  - "Christmas" (Season 1, Episode 3) (December 4, 2003)
- Trailer Park Boys]
  - "Dear Santa Claus, Go Fuck Yourself" (December 12, 2004)
- Trophy Wife
  - " 'Twas the Night Before Christmas...or 'Twas It?" (December 10, 2013) (Season 1, Episode 10)
- True Colors
  - "Christmas Show '90" (Season 1, Episode 14) (December 23, 1990)
  - "Broken Home: Parts 1 & 2" (Season 2, Episodes 11 & 12) (December 15 & 22, 1991)
- Tucker
  - "A Rottweiler Runs Through It" (Season 1, Episode 13) (December, 2001)
- TV Funhouse
  - "Christmas Day" (Season 1, Episode 3) (2000)
- Two and a Half Men
  - "Santa's Village of the Damned" (Season 3, Episode 11) (December 19, 2005)
  - "Walnuts and Demerol" (Season 4, Episode 11) (December 11, 2006)
  - "Warning, It's Dirty" (Season 7, Episode 11) (December 14, 2009)
  - "One False Move, Zimbabwe!" (Season 9, Episode 12) (December 12, 2011)
  - "Give Santa a Tail-Hole" (Season 10, Episode 11) (December 13, 2012)
  - "On Vodka, on Soda, on Blender, on Mixer!" (Season 11, Episode 10) (December 12, 2013)
  - "Family, Bublé, Deep-Fried Turkey" (Season 12, Episode 8) (December 18, 2014)
- Two Guys, a Girl, and a Pizza Place
  - "Two Guys, a Girl, and a Christmas Story" (Season 2, Episode 12) (December 16, 1998)
- Two of a Kind
  - "A Very Carrie Christmas" (Season 1, Episode 11) (December 11, 1998)
- The Two of Us
  - "The Christmas Thief" (Season 2, Episode 10) (December 28, 1981)
- Tyler Perry's Meet the Browns
  - "Meet the Christmas Spirit" (Season 3, Episode 9) (December 9, 2009)
- Undateable
  - "A Box of Puppies Walks Into a Bar" (Season 3, Episode 9) (December 11, 2015)
- Unhappily Ever After
  - "Hot Wheels" (Season 2, Episode 12) (December 12, 1995)
- Up All Night
  - "First Christmas" (December 7, 2011) (Season 1, Episode 11)
  - "First Snow" (December 14, 2012) (Season 2, Episode 10)
- Union Square
  - "The First Christmas Show" (Season 1, Episode 10) (December 18, 1997)
- United States of Al
  - "Christmas/Krismis" (Season 2, Episode 9) (December 9, 2021)
- Veep
  - "Congressional Ball" (2016) (Season 5, Episode 7)
  - "Camp David" (2016) (Season 5, Episode 8)
- Veronica's Closet
  - "Veronica's Christmas Song" (Season 1, Episode 10) (December 18, 1997)
  - "Veronica's Secret Santa" (Season 2, Episode 10) (December 10, 1998)
- The Wackiest Ship in the Army
  - "I'm Dreaming of a Wide Isthmus" (December 9, 1965) (Season 1, Episode 14)
- Wanda at Large
  - " 'Twas the Knife Before Christmas" (Season 2, Episode 12) (2003)
- The Wayans Bros.
  - "Psycho Santa" (Season 2, Episode 12) (December 20, 1995)
  - "A Country Christmas" (Season 5, Episode 11) (December 17, 1998)
- We Got It Made
  - "Upstairs, Downstairs (a.k.a. Christmas Clip Show)" (Season 2, Episode 13) (December 11, 1987)
- Webster
  - "The Man in the Red Flannel Suit" (Season 4, Episode 11) (December 12, 1986)
  - "Simple Gifts" (Season 5, Episode 12) (December 14, 1987)
- Welcome Back, Kotter
  - "Hark, the Sweatkings" (Season 2, Episode 12) (December 23, 1976)
  - "A Sweathog Christmas Special" (Season 3, Episode 15) (December 15, 1977)
  - "A Winter's Coat Tale" (Season 4, Episode 13) (December 16, 1978)
- Welcome to Flatch
  - "Merry Flatchmas" (May 26, 2022) (Season 1, Episode 14)
  - "O Come, All Ye Flatchful" (December 8, 2022) (Season 2, Episode 9)
- What's Happening!! / What's Happening Now!!
  - "Christmas" (Season 1, Episode 9) (December 11, 1976)
  - "Positive Identification" (Season 3, Episode 10) (December 21, 1978)
- What's Happening Now!!
  - "I'll Be Homeless for Christmas" (Season 2, Episode 18) (December 15, 1986)
- Where I Live
  - "Miracle on 134 Street" (Season 2, Episode 5) (1993)
- Where's Raymond? / The Ray Bolger Show
  - "Christmas" (Season 1, Episode 12) (December 24, 1953)
  - "Father for a Day" (Season 2, Episode 15) (December 24, 1954)
- Whitney
  - "Christmas Is Cummings" (Season 1, Episode 10) (December 8, 2011)
- Who's the Boss?
  - "Requiem" (Season 1, Episode 10) (December 18, 1984)
  - "The Christmas Card" (Season 3, Episode 11) (December 16, 1986)
  - "A Spirited Christmas" (Season 5, Episode 8) (December 20, 1988)
- Will & Grace
  - "Jingle Balls" (Season 4, Episode 12) (December 13, 2001)
  - "All About Christmas Eve" (Season 5, Episode 11) (December 12, 2002)
  - "Fanilow" (Season 6, Episode 10) (December 11, 2003)
  - "Christmas Break" (Season 7, Episode 12) (December 9, 2004)
  - "A Little Christmas Queer" (Season 8, Episode 9) (December 8, 2005)
  - "A Gay Olde Christmas" (Season 9, Episode 7) (December 5, 2017)
- Wings
  - "A Terminal Christmas" (Season 2, Episode 11) (December 21, 1990)
  - "The Customer's Usually Right" (Season 4, Episode 10) (December 17, 1992)
  - "Happy Holidays" (Season 5, Episode 11) (December 16, 1993)
  - "Insanity Claus" (Season 6, Episode 11) (December 13, 1994)
  - "Twas the Heist Before Christmas" (Season 7, Episode 10) (December 19, 1995)
  - "All About Christmas Eve" (Season 8, Episode 11) (December 18, 1996)
- WKRP in Cincinnati
  - "Jennifer's Home for Christmas" (Season 2, Episode 11) (December 17, 1979)
  - "Bah, Humbug" (Season 3, Episode 7) (December 6, 1980)
- Woops!
  - "Say It Ain't So Santa" (Season 1, Episode 10) (December 6, 1992)
- Workaholics
  - "The Strike" (2011) (Season 1, Episode 6)
- Working
  - "Medieval Christmas" (Season 1, Episode 9) (December 17, 1997)
  - "The Christmas Party" (Season 2, Episode 9) (December 22, 1998)
- Worst Week
  - "The Gift" (December 15, 2008) (Season 1, Episode 11)
- Yes, Dear
  - "All I Want for Christmas Is My Dead Uncle's Cash" (Season 1, Episode 11) (December 11, 2000)
- You Take the Kids
  - "Merry Christmas to All and a Pointy Hat to You" (Season 1, Episode 2) (December 22, 1990)
- You Wish
  - "Gift of the Travi" (Season 1, Episode 13) (1998)
- Young Rock
  - "A Christmas Peril" (December 15, 2021) (Season 1, Episode 12)
  - Dwanta Claus (December 16, 2022) (Season 3, Episode 6)
- Young & Hungry
  - "Young & Christmas" (Season 2, Episode 31) (2015)

=== Sketch Comedy ===
- Adam Ruins Everything
  - "Adam Ruins Christmas" (Season 1, Episode 25) (December 20, 2016)
- At Home with Amy Sedaris
  - "Holidays" (Season 1, Episode 7) (November 28, 2017)
- Carol Burnett
  - The Carol Burnett Show
    - "Episode #14" (Season 1, Episode 14) (December 25, 1967)
    - "Episode #43" (Season 2, Episode 12) (December 16, 1968)
    - "Episode #69" (Season 3, Episode 11) (December 15, 1969)
    - "Episode #201" (Season 8, Episode 12) (December 21, 1974)
- Cedric the Entertainer Presents
  - "Episode 9" (Season 1, Episode 9) (December 11, 2002)
- Comedy Bang! Bang!
  - "Zach Galifianakis Wears a Santa Suit" (Season 2, Episode 20) (December 20, 2013)
  - "The Lonely Island Wear Holiday Sweaters & White Pants" (Season 3, Episode 20) (December 19, 2014)
  - "Josh Groban Wears a Blue Blazer and Shiny Black Shoes" (Season 4, Episode 40) (December 10, 2015)
- The Edge
  - "Episode #11" (December 19, 1992)
- Girl Code:
  - "Holidays" (Season 3, Episode 13) (November 19, 2014)
- In Living Color
  - "Veracosa" (Season 2, Episode 12) (December 23, 1990)
  - "Driving Miss Schott" (Season 4, Episode 11) (December 20, 1992)
  - "The Dysfunctional Home Christmas Show" (Season 4, Episode 12) (1993)
- Laugh In
  - "Episode #26" (Season 2, Episode 10) (December 16, 1968)
  - "Episode #104" (Season 5, Episode 12) (December 13, 1971)
  - "Episode #129" (Season 6, Episode 13) (December 11, 1972)
- Mad TV:
  - Mad TV has Christmas episodes annually.
- Redd Foxx
  - The Redd Foxx Comedy Hour
    - 12-08-1977
- Whose Line Is It Anyway?
  - "Christmas Show" (Season 8, Episode 6) (December 12, 2005)
- Saturday Night Live
  - Saturday Night Live has Christmas episodes annually.
- Second City Television
  - SCTV Network 90
    - "Christmas" (Season 4 Episode 6) (December 17, 1982)
    - "It's a Wonderful Film" (Season 6 Episode 3) (December 20, 1983)
- Tracey Ullman
  - The Tracey Ullman Show
    - "Episode #40" (Season 3, Episode 5) (December 18, 1988)
    - "Episode #68" (Season 4, Episode 11) (December 17, 1989)

==== Comedy Central ====
- The Man Show
  - "Holiday Show" (Season 1, Episode 18) (December 12, 1999)
  - "Holiday Show" (Season 2, Episode 16) (December 17, 2000)
  - "Christmas Show" (Season 3, Episode 17) (December 23, 2001)
- Crank Yankers
  - "Holiday Special" (2004)
- Jeff Dunham
  - "Jeff Dunham's Very Special Christmas Special" (2008)

== Drama ==
- Baywatch
  - "Silent Night, Baywatch Night" (Season 5, Episodes 11 & 12) (1994)
- Big Love
  - Certain Poor Shepards (Season 5, Episode 3) (2011)
- Channing
  - "Christmas Day Is Breaking Wan" (Season 1, Episode 25) (1964)
- Dirty Sexy Money
  - "The Nutcracker" (Season 1, Episode 10) (2007)
- Everwood
  - "Unhappy Holidays" (Season 2, Episode 10) (2003)
  - "Need to Know" (Season 3, Episode 10) (2004)
- Homefront
  - "Sinners Reconciled" (Season 1, Episode 12) (1991)
- I'll Fly Away
  - "Comfort and Joy" (Season 2, Episode 11) (1992)
- The Last Tycoon
  - "A Brady-American Christmas" (Season 1, Episode 6) (2017)
- Lucas Tanner
  - "Merry Gentlemen" (Season 1, Episode 11) (1974)
- Midnight Caller
  - "Do You Believe in Miracles?" (Season 2, Episode 24) (1989)
- Movin' On
  - "Goin' Home" (Season 1, Episode 12 & 13) (1974)
- Nothing Sacred
  - "Hodie Christus Natus Est" (Season 1, Episode 11) (1997)
- October Road
  - "Deck the Howls" (Season 2, Episode 4) (2007)
- Our House
  - "Green Christmas" (Season 1, Episode 13) (1986)
- Promised Land
  - "Christmas" (Season 1, Episode 11) (1996)
- Relativity
  - "Unsilent Night" (Season 1, Episode 11) (1996)
- The Republic of Sarah
  - "Sons and Daughters" (Season 1, Episode 9) (2021)
- The Rogues
  - "Mr. White's Christmas" (Season 1, Episode 29) (1965)
- Run for Your Life
  - "Time and a Half on Christmas Eve" (Season 2, Episode 14) (1966)
- Six Feet Under
  - "Pilot" (Season 1, Episode 1' (2001)
  - "It's the Most Wonderful Time of the Year" (Season 2, Episode 8) (2002)
- Thirtysomething
  - "I'll Be Home for Christmas" (Season 1, Episode 9) (1987)
  - "The Mike Van Dyke Show" (Season 2, Episode 3) (1988)
- Touched by an Angel
  - "Fear Not!" (Season 1, Episode 9) (1994)
  - "The Feather" (Season 2, Episode 11) (1995)
  - "The Violin Lesson" (Season 3, Episode 13) (1996)
  - "It Came Upon a Midnight Clear" (Season 4, Episode 12) (1997)
  - "An Angel on the Roof" (Season 5, Episode 11) (1998)
  - "The Christmas Gift" (Season 6, Episode 10) (1999)
  - "An Angel on My Tree" (Season 7, Episode 10) (2000)
  - "A Winter Carol" (Season 8, Episode 11) (2001)
  - "The Christmas Watch" (Season 9, Episode 10) (2002)
- The Trials of Rosie O'Neill
  - "The Man from ELF" (Season 1, Episode 11) (1990)
- Treme
  - "Santa Claus, Do You Ever Get the Blues?" (Season 2, Episode 4) (2011)

=== Action / Adventure Drama ===
- The Fall Guy
  - "Escape Claus" (Season 5, Episode 8) (1985)
- Follow the Sun
  - "Mele Kalikimaka to You" (Season 1, Episode 15) (1961)
- Here's Boomer
  - "A Christmas for Boomer" (1979)
- Human Target
  - "The Other Side of the Mall" (Season 2, Episode 6) (2010)
- MacGyver
  - "The Madonna" (Season 5, Episode 11) (1989)
- The Pretender
  - "Not Even a Mouse" (Season 1, Episode 8) (1996)
- Rescue 8
  - "The Bells of Fear" (Season 1, Episode 12) (1958)
- Scorpion
  - "Dominoes" (Season 1, Episode 12) (2014)
  - "Dam Breakthrough" (Season 2, Episode 12) (2015)

=== Anthology ===
- The 20th Century Fox Hour
  - "The Miracle on 34th Street" (1955)
- ABC Stage 67
  - "A Christmas Memory" (1966)
- Actors Studio
  - "The Man Who Lost Christmas" (1948)
  - "A Child Is Born" (1949)
- The Alcoa Hour
  - "Amahl and the Night Visitors" (1955)
  - "Merry Christmas, Mr. Baxter" (1956)
  - "The Stingiest Man in Town" (1956)
- American Playhouse
  - "A Matter of Principle" (1984)
  - " Tru" (1992)
  - "Hallelujah" (1993)
- Armstrong Circle Theatre
  - "The Visitor" (1952)
  - "The Tree in the Empty Room" (1953)
  - "Ring Twice for Christmas" (1954)
  - "A Picture of Christmas" (1958)
- The Best of Broadway
  - "The Man Who Came to Dinner" (1954)
- Bob Hope
  - Bob Hope Presents the Chrysler Theatre
    - "The Eighth Day" (1966)
- Cavalcade of America
  - "Barbed Wire Christmas" (1955)
  - "The Blessed Midnight" (1956)
  - "Three Young Kings" (1956)
- Crossroads
  - "Our First Christmas Tree" (1956)
- The DuPont Show with June Allyson
  - "A Silent Panic" (1960)
- Family Theatre
  - "A Star Shall Rise" (1952)
- Fireside Theatre
  - "A Christmas Carol" (1951)
  - "Practically Christmas" (1953)
  - "Jane Wyman Presents the Fireside Theatre: The Night After Christmas" (1957)
- Ford Television Theatre
  - "Joy To The World" (1948)
  - "The Man Who Came To Dinner" (1949)
  - "A Kiss for Santa" (1955)
- Four Star Playhouse
  - "The Gift" (1953)
  - "The Answer" (1954)
- General Electric Theater
  - " Music for Christmas" (1954)
  - "A Child Is Born" (1955)
  - "The Trail to Christmas" (1957)
- Hallmark Hall of Fame
  - "Amahl and the Night Visitors" (1951)
  - "Amahl and the Night Visitors" (1953)
  - "Amahl and the Night Visitors" (1954)
  - "Twelfth Night" (1957)
  - "The Christmas Tree" (1958)
  - "A Christmas Festival" (1959)
  - "A Cry of Angels" (1963)
  - "Amahl and the Night Visitors" (1964)
  - "Amahl and the Night Visitors" (1965)
  - "The Littlest Angel" (1969)
  - "The Man Who Came to Dinner" (1972)
  - "Have I Got a Christmas for You" (1977)
  - "Stubby Pringle's Christmas" (1978)
  - "A Season for Miracles" (1999)
  - "Fallen Angel" (2003)
  - "Silver Bells" (2005)
  - "Candles on Bay Street" (2006)
  - "A Dog Named Christmas" (2009)
  - "November Christmas" (2010)
  - "Have a Little Faith" (2011)
  - "Christmas with Holly" (2012)
  - "Christmas in Conway" (2013)
  - "One Christmas Eve" (2014)
  - "Just in Time for Christmas" (2015)
  - "A Heavenly Christmas" (2016)
  - "The Christmas Train" (2017)
  - "Christmas Everlasting" (2018)
  - "A Christmas Love Story" (2019)
- Kraft Television Theatre
  - "Reverie/The Desert Shall Rejoice" (1947)
  - "Hansel and Gretel" (1948)
  - "Incident on Fifth Avenue" (1951)
  - "A Christmas Carol" (1952)
  - "A Child Is Born" (1954)
  - "The Christmas Dinner" (1955)
  - "The Wonderful Gift" (1956)
  - "The Other Wise Man" (1957)
- Joseph Schildkraut Presents
  - " Ring Around the Christmas Tree" (1953)
- The Loretta Young Show
  - "The Night My Father Came Home" (1953)
  - "Time and Yuletide" (1954)
  - "Christmas Stopover" (1955)
  - "Three and Two, Please" (1956)
  - "Most Honorable Day" (1958)
- Lux Video Theatre
  - "A Child Is Born" (1950)
  - "A Child Is Born" (1951)
  - "A Child Is Born" (1952)
  - "Holiday Affair" (1955)
  - "Christmas in Connecticut" (1956)
- The Millionaire
  - "Millionaire Wilbur Gerrold" (1955)
- The O. Henry Playhouse
  - "Christmas by Injunction" (1957)
- Playhouse 90
  - "The Nutcracker" (1958)
  - "The Silver Whistle" (1959)
- Robert Montgomery Presents
  - "A Christmas Gift" (1951)
  - "The Christmas Cards" (1952)
  - "What About Christmas?" (1953)
  - "The Second Day of Christmas" (1955)
  - "Amahl and the Night Visitors" (1956)
- Schlitz Playhouse of Stars
  - "The Baker of Barnbury" (1953)
  - "Christmas Guest" (1955)
  - "A Light in the Desert" (1956)
- Screen Directors Playhouse
  - "Tom and Jerry" (1955)
- Shower of Stars
  - "A Christmas Carol" (1954)
- Startime
  - "Christmas Startime" (1959)
- Studio 57
  - "Christmas Every Day" (1954)
  - "Santa's Old Suit" (1955)
  - "Once Upon a Christmas Eve" (1956)
- The United States Steel Hour
  - "One Red Rose for Christmas" (1958)
- Westinghouse Desilu Playhouse
  - "The Desilu Revue" (1959)
- Westinghouse Studio One
  - "The Nativity" (1952)
  - "A Christmas Surprise" (1956)
- Your Jeweler's Showcase
  - "Christmas is Magic" (1955)

=== Comedy-drama ===
- Ally McBeal
  - "Boy to the World" (Season 1, Episode 10) (1997)
  - "Silver Bells" (Season 1, Episode 11) (1997)
  - "Making Spirits Bright" (Season 2, Episode 10) (1998)
  - "Saving Santa" (Season 3, Episode 7) (1999)
  - "Blue Christmas" (Season 3, Episode 8) (1999)
  - " 'Tis the Season" (Season 4, Episode 6) (2000)
  - "The Man with the Bag" (Season 4, Episode 8) (2000)
  - "Nine One One" (Season 5, Episode 7) (2001)
- American Dreams
  - "Silent Night" (Season 1, Episode 10) (2002)
  - "Tidings of Comfort and Joy" (Season 3, Episode 9) (2004)
- Apple's Way
  - "The Christmas Party" (Season 2, Episode 13) (1974)
- The Baby-Sitters Club
  - The Baby-Sitters' Special Christmas (Season 1, Episode 5) (1991)
- The Bear
  - "Fishes" (Season 2, Episode 6) (2023)
- Beverly Hills Buntz
  - "A Christmas Carol" (Season 1, Episode 9) (1988)
- B. J. and the Bear
  - "Silent Night, Unholy Night" (Season 2, Episode 12) (1979)
- Boston Legal
  - "Loose Lips" (Season 1, Episode 8) (2004)
  - "The Nutcracker" (Season 3, Episode 10) (2006)
  - "Green Christmas" (Season 4, Episode 10) (2007)
- The Carrie Diaries
  - "The Second Time Around" (Season 2, Episode 8) (2013)
- Chuck
  - "Chuck Versus the Crown Vic" (Season 1, Episode 11) (2007)
  - "Chuck Versus Santa Claus" (Season 2, Episode 11) (2008)
  - "Chuck Versus the Santa Suit" (Season 5, Episode 7) (2011)
- Cobra Kai
  - "Feel the Night" (Season 3, Episode 9) (2021)
  - "December 19" (Season 3, Episode 10) (2021)
- The Commish
  - "No Greater Gift" (Season 1, Episode 10) (1991)
  - "A Christmas Story" (Season 4, Episode 11) (1994)
- Crazy Ex-Girlfriend
  - "My Mom, Greg's Mom and Josh's Sweet Dance Moves!" (Season 1, Episode 8) (2015)
- Cupid
  - "Hung Jury" (Season 1, Episode 10) (1998)
- Dash & Lily (2020)
- Desperate Housewives
  - "The Miracle Song" (Season 3, Episode 10) (2006)
  - "Boom Crunch" (Season 6, Episode 10) (2009)
- Dickinson
  - "There's a Certain Slant of Light" (Season 1, Episode 8) (2019)
- Doogie Howser, M.D.
  - "Doogie the Red-Nosed Reindeer" (Season 1, Episode 13) (1989)
- The Dukes of Hazzard
  - "The Great Santa Claus Chase" (Season 3, Episode 10) (1980)
- Ed
  - "Your Life is Now" (Season 1, Episode 9) (2000)
  - "Charity Cases" (Season 2, Episode 9) (2001)
  - "Home for Christmas" (Season 4, Episode 11) (2003)
- Eight Is Enough
  - "Yes, Nicholas, There Is a Santa Claus" (Season 2, Episode 13-14) (1977)
- Elsbeth
  - "Gold, Frankincense, and Murder" (Season 2, Episode 6) (2024)
  - "A Hard Nut to Crack" (Season 3, Episode 10) (2025)
- The Four Seasons
  - "Trento" (Season 2, Episode 7) (2026)
  - "Maratona" (Season 2, Episode 8) (2026)
- Frank's Place
  - "Season's Greetings" (Season 1, Episode 13) (1987)
- The Game
  - "There's No Place Like Home" (Season 1, Episode 10) (2006)
  - "The Ghost of Derwin Past" (Season 2, Episode 10) (2007)
- Get Real
  - "Denial" (Season 1, Episode 10) (1999)
- Getting On
  - "The 7th Annual Christmas Card Competition" (Season 2, Episode 4) (2014)
- Gilmore Girls
  - "Forgiveness and Stuff" (Season 1, Episode 10) (December 21, 2000)
  - "The Bracebridge Dinner" (Season 2, Episode 10) (December 11, 2001)
  - "Santa's Secret Stuff" (Season 7, Episode 11) (January 23, 2007)
  - Gilmore Girls: A Year in the Life
    - "Winter" (Season 1, Episode 1) (November 25, 2016)
- GLOW
  - "A Very Glow Christmas" (Season 3, Episode 10) (2019)
- Going My Way
  - "Keep an Eye on Santa Claus" (Season 1, Episode 11) (1962)
- Hacks
  - "The Deborah Vance Christmas Spectacular" (Season 3, Episode 7) (2024)
- Happy!
  - (Season 1)
- Hart of Dixie
  - "Hairdos & Holidays" (Season 1, Episode 10) (2011)
  - "Blue Christmas" (Season 2, Episode 10) (2012)
- Hooperman
  - "Deck the Cell with Bars of Folly" (Season 1, Episode 11) (1987)
- Huff
  - "Christmas Is Ruined" (Season 1, Episode 9) (2005)
- Jane the Virgin
  - "Chapter Thirty" (Season 2, Episode 8) (2015)
- Las Vegas
  - "White Christmas" (Season 4, Episode 8) (2006)
  - "A Cannon Carol" (Season 5, Episode 11) (2007)
- Lethal Weapon
  - "Jingle Bell Glock" (Season 1, Episode 9) (2016)
- Life Goes On
  - "The Smell of Fear" (Season 3, Episode 11' (1991)
  - "Happy Holidays (Season 4, Episode 9)" (1992)
- Lou Grant
  - "Christmas" (Season 1, Episode 13) (1977)
- Louie
  - "New Year's Eve" (Season 3, Episode 13) (2012)
- M*A*S*H
  - "Dear Dad" (Season 1, Episode 12) (December 17, 1972)
  - "Dear Sis" (Season 7, Episode 14) (December 18, 1978)
  - "Death Takes a Holiday" (Season 9, Episode 5) (December 15, 1980)
  - "Twas the Day After Christmas" (Season 10, Episode 10) (December 28, 1981)
  - AfterMASH
    - "All About Christmas Eve" (Season 1, Episode 12) (December 19, 1983)
- Miss Match
  - "Santa, Baby" (Season 1, Episode 10) (2003)
- Moonlighting
  - "Twas the Episode Before Christmas" (Season 2, Episode 10) (1985)
  - "It's a Wonderful Job" (Season 3, Episode 8) (1986)
- Northern Exposure
  - "Seoul Mates" (Season 3, Episode 10) (1991)
- Orange Is the New Black
  - "Can't Fix Crazy" (Season 1, Episode 13) (2013)
- Parenthood
  - "What to My Wondering Eyes" (Season 4, Episode 11) (2012)
- Picket Fences
  - "High Tidings" (Season 1, Episode 13) (1992)
  - "Blue Christmas" (Season 2, Episode 9) (1993)
  - "Away in the Manger" (Season 3, Episode 10) (1994)
- Poker Face
  - "One Last Job" (Season 2, Episode 7) (2025)
- Rags to Riches
  - "A Very Foley Christmas" (Season 2, Episode 10) (1987)
- Related
  - "Have Yourself a Sorelli Little Christmas" (Season 1, Episode 9) (2005)
- Remember WENN
  - "Christmas in the Airwaves" (Season 2, Episode 6) (1996)
- The Righteous Gemstones
  - "Interlude II" (Season 2, Episode 5) (2022)
- Royal Pains
  - "Off-Season Greetings" (Season 4, Episodes 15-16) (2012)
- Sex and the City
  - "The Perfect Present" (Season 6, Episode 3) (2003)
- Shirley
  - "Visions of Christmas Past" (Season 1, Episode 10) (1979)
- The Smith Family
  - "Christmas Rush" (Season 2, Episode 14) (1971)
- Snoops
  - "The Grinch" (Season 1, Episode 9) (1999)
- Sports Night
  - "The Six Southern Gentlemen of Tennessee" (Season 1, Episode 11) (1998)
  - "The Reunion" (Season 2, Episode 8) (1999)
- Studio 60 on the Sunset Strip
  - "The Christmas Show" (Season 1, Episode 11)) (2006)
- Sweet Valley High
  - "You Call This a Wonderful Life" (Season 2, Episode 15) (1995)
- Ted Lasso
  - "Carol of the Bells" (Season 2, Episode 4) (2021)
- This Is Us
  - "Last Christmas" (Season 1, Episode 10) (2016)
- Ugly Betty
  - "Fake Plastic Snow" (Season 1, Episode 10) (2006)
  - "Giving Up The Ghost" (Season 2, Episode 9) (2007)
  - "Be-Shure" (Season 4, Episode 9) (2009)
- Window on Main Street
  - "Christmas Memory" (Season 1, Episode 12) (1961)
- Miss Farah (Arabic: الآنسة فرح)
  - "Chapter Thirty" (Arabic: الفصل الثلاثون) (Season 2, Episode 8) (2020)

=== Coming-of-Age Drama ===
- The Wonder Years
  - "Christmas" (Season 2, Episode 3) (1988)
  - "A Very Cutlip Christmas" (Season 4, Episode 9) (1990)
  - "Christmas Party" (Season 5, Episode 9) (1991)
  - "Let Nothing You Dismay" (Season 6, Episode 10) (1992)
  - "Home for Christmas" (Season 1, Episode 9) (2021)

=== Crime Drama/Mystery ===
- 21 Jump Street
  - "Christmas in Saigon" (1987)
- 77 Sunset Strip
  - Bullets for Santa (1961)
- 9-1-1
  - "Merry Ex-Mas" (2018)
  - "Christmas Spirit" (2019)
  - "Wrapped in Red" (2021)
- Adam-12
  - "Log 122: Christmas—The Yellow Dump Truck" (1968)
  - "Log 46: Pilgrimage" (1970)
  - "Christmas" (1974)
- Alfred Hitchcock
  - Alfred Hitchcock Presents
    - "Santa Claus and the Tenth Avenue Kid" (1955)
    - "Back for Christmas" (1956)
    - "Together" (1958)
    - "The Festive Season" (1958)
- Alias
  - "Spirit" (2001)
- All Rise
  - "The Joy of Oz" (2019)
- Aquarius
  - "Why?" (2015)
  - "It's Alright Ma (I'm Only Bleeding)" (2015)
- The Avengers
  - "Too Many Christmas Trees" (1965)
- Bones
  - "The Man in the Fallout Shelter" (2005)
  - "Santa in the Slush" (2007)
  - "The Goop on the Girl" (2009)
- Buddy Faro
  - "Done Away in a Manger" (1998)
- Bull
  - "Home For The Holidays" (2017)
  - "Imminent Danger" (2019)
  - "The Ex Factor" (2020)
- Cagney & Lacey
  - "I'll Be Home for Christmas" (1982)
  - "Play It Again, Santa" (1985)
- Castle
  - "Secret Santa" (2012)
  - "Bad Santa" (2014)
- CHiPs
  - "Christmas Watch" (1979)
- City Detective
  - "Christmas Pardon" (1953)
- The Closer
  - "Next of Kin Parts 1 and 2" (2007)
  - "Living Proof Parts 1 and 2" (2010)
  - "You Have the Right to Remain Jolly" (2011)
  - "Relative Matters" (2011)
- Cold Case
  - "Frank's Best" (2005)
  - "The Red and The Blue" (2006)
  - "Wings" (2008)
- Crossing Jordan
  - Blue Christmas (2001)
- CSI
  - CSI: NY
    - "Silent Night" (2006)
    - "Second Chances" (2009)
    - "Shop Till You Drop" (2010)
  - CSI: Crime Scene Investigation
    - "The Lost Reindeer" (2013)
- Delvecchio
  - "APB: Santa Claus" (1976)
- Dexter
  - "Truth Be Told" (Season 1, Episode 11) (2006)
  - "Do You See What I See" (Season 7, Episode 11) (2012)
- Diagnosis: Murder
  - "Murder in the Family" (1996)
  - "Murder: Santa Claude" (1999)
- The District
  - "The Santa Wars" (2000)
  - "Small Packages" (2002)
- Doc
  - "Tis the Season" (Season 2, Episode 12) (2001)
- Dragnet
  - "The Big .22 Rifle for Christmas" (1952)
  - "The Big Little Jesus" (1953)
  - "The Christmas Story" (1967)
- The Equalizer
  - "Christmas Presence" (1987)
- Evil
  - "7 Swans a Singin' " (2019)
- Family Law
  - "Angel's Flight" (Season 3, Episode 11) (2001)
- Father Dowling Mysteries
  - "The Christmas Mystery" (1990)
- The F.B.I.
  - "Dark Christmas" (1972)
- FBI: Most Wanted
  - "Run-Hide-Fight" (2022)
- Forever
  - "Skinny Dipper" (2014)
- The Good Wife
  - "The Decision Tree" (Season 5, Episode 10) (2013)
- Hardcastle and McCormick
  - "Hate the Picture, Love the Frame" (1984)
- Hart to Hart
  - " 'Tis the Season to Be Murdered" (1980)
  - "Hartbreak Kid" (1981)
  - "A Christmas Hart" (1982)
  - "Trust Your Hart" (1983)
- Hawaii Five-0
  - "Hana 'a'a Makehewa (Desperate Measures)" (2010)
  - "Kahu (Guardian)" (2012)
  - "Pukana (Keepsake)" (2013)
  - "Ke Koho Mamao Aku (Longshot)" (2014)
  - "Oni Kalalea Ke Ku a Ka La'au Loa (A Tall Tree Stands Above the Others)" (2017)
- Hawkeye
  - (2021)
- Highway Patrol
  - "Christmas Story" (1956)
- Hill Street Blues
  - "Santaclaustrophobia" (1982)
- Homicide: Life on the Street
  - "All Through the House" (1994)
  - "All is Bright" (1997)
- Houston Knights
  - "Somebody to Love" (1987)
- How to Get Away with Murder
  - "Best Christmas Ever" (2015)
  - "Where Are Your Parents?" (2019)
- In the Heat of the Night
  - "My Name is Hank" (1989)
  - "Blessings" (1990)
- Jake and the Fatman
  - "Have Yourself a Merry Little Christmas" (1987)
  - "What Child Is This?" (1989)
- Judging Amy
  - "Waterworld" (Season 2, Episode 8) (2000)
- Knight Rider
  - "Silent Knight" (Season 2, Episode 12) (1983)
- Kojak
  - "How Cruel the Frost, How Bright the Stars" (1975)
- Kraft Suspense Theatre
  - "Are There Any More Out There Like You?" (1963)
- Kung Fu: The Legend Continues
  - "A Shaolin Christmas" (1996)
- L.A. Law
  - "Sidney, the Dead-Nosed Reindeer" (Season 1, Episode 13) (1986)
  - "Divorce with Extreme Prejudice" (Season 2, Episode 9) (1987)
  - "Dummy Dearest" (Season 3, Episode 6) (1988)
  - "Placenta Claus Is Coming to Town" (Season 4, Episode 7) (1989)
  - "God Rest Ye Murray Gentlemen" (Season 5, Episode 8) (1990)
  - "The Nut Before Christmas" (Season 6, Episode 8) (1991)
  - "Christmas Stalking" (Season 7, Episode 8) (1992)
  - Rhyme and Punishment" (Season 8, Episode 9) (1993)
- The Law and Mr. Jones
  - "Christmas Is a Legal Holiday" (Season 1, Episode 10) (1960)
- Law & Order
  - Law & Order: Organized Crime
    - "The Christmas Episode" (2021)
    - "Last Christmas" (2022)
  - Law & Order: Special Victims Unit
    - "Presumed Guilty" (2013)
    - "Silent Night, Hateful Night" (2022)
    - "And a Trauma in a Pear Tree" (2022)
- Leverage
  - The Ho Ho Ho Job (Season 3, Episode 14) (2010)
  - The Toy Job (Season 5, Episode 14) (2012)
- Lie to Me
  - "Secret Santa" (Season 2, Episode 8) (2010)
- Magnum, P.I.
  - "Thank Heaven for Little Girls (and Big Ones Too)" (1980)
  - "Operation: Silent Night" (1983)
- Major Crimes
  - "Curve Ball" (2013)
  - "Risk Assessment" (2013)
  - "Chain Reaction" (2014)
  - "Penalty Phase" (2015)
- Martial Law
  - "Sammo Claus" (1999)
- Matlock
  - 1986
    - "Santa Claus" (1986)
    - "The Gift" (1987)
    - "The Scrooge" (1989)
  - 2024
    - "Belly of the Beast" (2024)
    - "Call It a Christmas Gift" (2025)
- McCloud
  - " 'Twas the Fight Before Christmas" (1976)
- The Mentalist
  - "Jolly Red Elf" (2010)
- The Mod Squad
  - "Kristie" (1972)
- Monk
  - "Mr. Monk and the Secret Santa" (2005)
  - "Mr. Monk Meets His Dad" (2006)
  - "Mr. Monk and the Man Who Shot Santa Claus" (2007)
  - "Mr. Monk and the Miracle" (2008)
  - "Mr. Monk and the End" (2009)
- Murder, She Wrote
  - "A Christmas Secret" (1992)
- Miss Fisher's Murder Mysteries
  - "Murder Under the Mistletoe" (2013)
- Naked City
  - "And a Merry Christmas to the Force on Patrol" (1958)
- Nash Bridges
  - "25 Hours of Christmas" (1996)
- A Nero Wolfe Mystery
  - "Christmas Party" (2001)
- NCIS
  - "Silent Night" (2008)
  - "Faith" (2009)
  - "False Witness" (2010)
  - "Newborn King" (2011)
  - "You Better Watch Out" (2012)
  - "Homesick" (2013)
  - "House Rule" (2014)
  - "Spinning Wheel" (2015)
  - "The Tie That Binds" (2016)
  - "Double Down" (2017)
  - "What Child Is This" (2018)
  - "The North Pole" (2019)
  - "Humbug" (2024)
  - "Heaven and Nature" (2025)
  - NCIS: Los Angeles
    - "Brimstone" (2009)
    - "Disorder" (2010)
    - "Higher Power" (2011)
    - "Free Ride" (2012)
    - "Merry Evasion" (2013)
    - "Humbug" (2014)
    - "Cancel Christmas" (2015)
    - "Tidings We Bring" (2016)
    - "All Is Bright" (2017)
    - "Joyride" (2018)
    - "Answers" (2019)
  - NCIS: New Orleans
    - "Stolen Valor" (2014)
    - "Blue Christmas" (2015)
- NYPD Blue
  - "From Hare to Eternity" (1993)
- Over My Dead Body
  - "Carrie Christmas and a Nappie New Year" (1990)
- Police Woman
  - "Merry Christmas, Waldo" (1977)
- Prodigal Son
  - "Silent Night" (2019)
- Profiler
  - "Old Acquaintance" (1997)
  - "Home for the Homicide" (1998)
  - "Original Sin" (1999)
- Psych
  - "Gus's Dad May Have Killed an Old Guy" (Season 2, Episode 10) (December 7, 2007)
  - "Christmas Joy" (2008) (Season 3, Episode 9) (November 28, 2008)
  - "The Polarizing Express" (Season 5, Episode 15) (December 15, 2010)
- Public Defender
  - "Socrates" (1954)
- Racket Squad
  - "The Christmas Caper" (1952)
- Remington Steele
  - "Dancer, Prancer, Donner and Steele" (1985)
- Riptide
  - "Home for Christmas" (1985)
- The Rogues
  - "Mr. White's Christmas" (1965)
- The Rookies
  - "Blue Christmas" (1974)
- Scarecrow and Mrs. King
  - "The Long Christmas Eve" (1983)
  - "Santa's Got a Brand New Bag" (1986)
- Simon & Simon
  - "Yes, Virginia, There Is a Liberace" (1984)
- The Sopranos
  - "...To Save Us All From Satan's Power" (2001)
  - "Kaisha" (Season 6, Episode 12) (2006)
- Spenser: For Hire
  - "The Hopes and Fears" (1986)
- Starsky & Hutch
  - "Little Girl Lost" (1976)
- Station 19
  - "All I Want For Christmas is You" (2021)
- Suspense
  - "Dancing Dan's Christmas" (1950)
  - "The Gift of Fear" (1953)
- Sue Thomas: F.B.Eye
  - "Silent Night" (2002)
- S.W.A.T
  - 1975
    - "Silent Night, Deadly Night" (1975)
  - 2017
    - "Miracle" (2017)
- T.J. Hooker
  - "Slay Ride" (1983)
- True Detective
  - "Part 4" (2024)
- The Untouchables
  - "The Night They Shot Santa Claus" (1962)
- Vega$
  - "Christmas Story" (1980)
- Walker, Texas Ranger
  - "The Covenant" (1995)
  - "A Ranger's Christmas" (1996)
  - "A Matter of Faith" (1999)
- The Wire
  - "Final Grades" (2006)
- Wiseguy
  - "Aria for Don Aiuppo" (1988)
- Without a Trace
  - "Malone v. Malone" (2004)
  - "Claus and Effect" (2007)

=== Family Drama ===
- 7th Heaven
  - "Here Comes Santa Claus" (Season 3, Episode 10) (1998)
  - "X-Mas" (Season 10, Episode 11) (2005)
  - "Christmas!" (Season 11, Episode 11) (2006)
- A Million Little Things
  - "Christmas Wishlist" (Season 1, Episode 10) (2018)
- Brothers & Sisters
  - "Light the Lights" (Season 1, Episode 10) (2006)
  - "Cold Turkey" (Season 5, Episode 10) (2010)
- Family
  - "On the First Day of Christmas" (Season 2, Episode 9) (1976)
  - "A Child Is Given" (Season 3, Episode 11) (1977)
  - "Gifts" (Season 4, Episode 8) (1978)
  - " 'Tis the Season" (Season 5, Episode 2) (1979)
- Once and Again
  - "The Gingerbread House" (Season 1, Episode 12) (1999)
  - "Pictures" (Season 3, Episode 10) (2001)
- Sisters
  - "Egg Nog" (Season 2, Episode 11) (1991)
  - "Broken Angel" (Season 4, Episode 11) (1993)
  - "A Child Is Given" (Season 5, Episode 11) (1994)
- The Waltons
  - "The Homecoming: A Christmas Story" (1971 - pilot movie)
  - "The Best Christmas" (Season 5, Episode 11) (1976)
  - "The Children's Carol" (Season 6, Episode 11) (1977)
  - "Day of Infamy" (Season 7, Episode 10) (1978)
  - "The Spirit" (Season 8, Episode 12) (1979)

=== Medical Drama ===
- Ben Casey
  - "Between Summer and Winter, the Glorious Season" (1962)
- Chicago
  - Chicago Fire
    - "Merry Christmas, Etc." (Season 1, Episode 10) (2012)
  - "Santa Bites" (Season 3, Episode 10) (2014)
- Chicago Hope
  - "Christmas Truce" (1995)
  - "On Golden Pons" (1997)
- City of Angels
  - "Smoochas Gracias" (2000)
- Dr. Kildare
  - "Dr. Kildare: Season to Be Jolly" (Season 1, Episode 13) (1961)
  - "Dr. Kildare: An Exchange of Gifts" (Season 4, Episode 13) (1964)
- ER
  - "Blizzard" (1994)
  - "The Gift" (1994)
  - "A Miracle Happens Here" (1995)
  - "Homeless for the Holidays" (1996)
  - "Do You See What I See?" (1997)
  - "The Miracle Worker" (1998)
  - "How the Finch Stole Christmas" (1999)
  - The Greatest of Gifts" (2000)
  - "Piece of Mind" (2001)
  - "I'll Be Home for Christmas" (2001)
  - "Hindsight" (2002)
  - "Makemba" (2003)
  - "Twas the Night" (2004)
  - "All About Christmas Eve" (2005)
  - "City of Mercy" (2006)
  - "The High Holiday" (2008)
- Grey's Anatomy
  - "Grandma Got Run Over By a Reindeer" (2005)
  - "Holidaze" (2009)
  - "Adrift and at Peace" (2010)
  - "Run, Baby, Run" (2012)
  - "Things We Said Today" (2013)
  - "Girlfriend in a Coma" (2018)
  - "It Came Upon a Midnight Clear" (2021)
- House
  - "Damned If You Do" (2004)
  - "Deception" (2005)
  - "Merry Little Christmas" (2006)
  - "It's a Wonderful Lie" (2007)
  - "Joy to the World" (2008)
- Medic
  - "Red Christmas" (1954)
- Medical Investigation
  - "The Unclean" (2004)
- Nip/Tuck
  - "Joy Kringle" (2005)
  - "Reefer" (2006)
  - "Duke Collins" (2007)
- The Pretender
  - "Not Even a Mouse" (1996)
- Private Practice
  - "Georgia on My Mind" (2012)
- Providence
  - "Home for the Holidays" (1999)
  - "The Gift" (2000)
  - "The Mating Dance" (2001)
  - "The Eleventh Hour" (2002)
- Royal Pains
  - "Off-Season Greetings" (2012)
- Saving Hope
  - "Shine a Light" (2015)
- St. Elsewhere
  - "Santa Claus is Dead" (1985)
- Strong Medicine
  - "Blessed Events" (2000)
  - "Seize the Day" (2003)
  - "Virgin Birth" (2004)
  - "We Wish You a Merry Cryst-Meth" (2005)
- Third Watch
  - "The Spirit" (2003)
- Trapper John, M.D.
  - " 'Tis the Season" (1981)

=== Military Drama ===
- China Beach
  - "X-Mas Chn. Bch. VN, '67" (Season 2, Episode 4) (1988)
- JAG
  - "Jaggle Bells" (Season 4, Episode 11) (1998)
  - "Ghosts of Christmas Past" (Season 5, Episode 11) (1999)
  - "Answered Prayers" (Season 7, Episode 11) (2001)
  - "All Ye Faithful" (Season 8, Episode 11) (2002)
  - "A Merry Little Christmas" (Season 9, Episode 11) (2003)
  - "The Four Percent Solution" (Season 10, Episode 10) (2004)
- Tour of Duty
  - "Green Christmas" (Season 3, Episode 11) (1989)

=== Mellodrama ===
- Falcon Crest
  - "Merry Christmas, Charley" (Season 9, Episode 9) (1979)
- Flamingo Road
  - "The Little Foxes" (Season 2, Episode 7) (1981)
- Dynasty
  - "That Holiday Spirit" (Season 5, Episode 12) (1984)
  - "That Holiday Spirit" (Season 5, Episode 2) (2021)
- Hotel
  - "Christmas" (Season 1, Episode 11) (1983)
  - "Comfort and Joy" (Season 5, Episode 11) (1987)

=== Musical Drama ===
- Fame
  - "Ebenezer Morloch" (Season 5, Episode 9) (1985)
  - "All I Want for Christmas" (Season 6, Episode 9) (1986)
- Glee
  - "A Very Glee Christmas" (Season 2, Episode 10) (2010)
  - "Extraordinary Merry Christmas" (Season 3, Episode 9) (2011)
  - "Glee, Actually" (Season 4, Episode 10) (2012)
  - "Previously Unaired Christmas" (Season 5, Episode 8) (2013)
- High School Musical: The Musical: The Series
  - "High School Musical: The Musical: The Holiday Special" (2020)
- Seven Brides for Seven Brothers
  - "Christmas Song" (Season 1, Episode 13) (1982)

=== Period Drama ===
- Mad Men
  - "Shut the Door. Have a Seat." (Season 3, Episode 13) (2009)
  - "Christmas Comes But Once a Year" (Season 4, Episode 2) (2010)
  - "Christmas Waltz" (Season 5, Episode 10) (2012)

=== Political Drama ===
- Designated Survivor
  - "Line of Fire" (Season 2, Episode 10) (2017)
- The West Wing
  - "In Excelsis Deo" (Season 1, Episode 10) (1999)
  - "Noël" (Season 2, Episode 10) (2000)
  - "Bartlet for America" (Season 3, Episode 10) (2001)
  - "Holy Night" (Season 4, Episode 11) (2002)
  - "Abu el Banat" (Season 5, Episode 9) (2003)
  - "Impact Winter" (Season 6, Episode 9) (2004)

=== Science Fiction/Fantasy - Supernatural/Horror ===
- Amazing Stories
  - "Santa '85" (1985)
  - "Unholy Night" (2012)
- American Horror Stories
  - "The Naughty List" (2021)
- Beauty and the Beast
  - "God Bless the Child" (1988)
- Big Bad Beetleborgs
  - "Christmas Bells and Phantom's Spells" (Season 1, Episode 33) (1996)
- Charmed
  - "Jingle Hell" (2018)
- Chucky
  - "Chucky Actually" (Season 2, Episode 8) (2022)
- Cinema Insomnia
  - "The Little Shop of Horrors" (2010)
- The Dead Zone
  - "A Very Dead Zone Christmas" (2005)
- Early Edition
  - "Christmas" (1996)
- Eastwick
  - "Magic Snow and Creep Gene" (Season 1, Episode 11) (2009)
- Eureka
  - "O Little Town" (2010)
  - "Do You See What I See?" (2011)
- Ghost Whisperer
  - "Holiday Spirit" (2007)
- Grimm
  - "Let Your Hair Down" (2011)
  - "Twelve Days of Krampus" (2013)
  - "The Grimm Who Stole Christmas" (2014)
- Haven
  - "Silent Night" (2011)
- Highway to Heaven
  - "Another Song for Christmas" (1984)
  - "Basinger's New York" (1986)
  - "With Love, the Claus" (1987)
  - "Merry Christmas from Grandpa" (1989)
- Into the Dark
  - "Pooka!" (2018)
  - "A Nasty Piece of Work" (2019)
- iZombie
  - "Cape Town" (2015)
- Journeyman
  - "Home by Another Way" (2007)
- Kolchak: The Night Stalker
  - "The Werewolf" (1974)
- Legacies
  - "This Christmas Was Surprisingly Violent" (2019)
- The Librarians
  - "And Santa's Midnight Run" (2014)
  - "And the Christmas Thief" (2017)
- Love, Death & Robots
  - "All Through the House" (2021)
- The Man from U.N.C.L.E.
  - "The Jingle Bells Affair" (1966)
- Millennium
  - "Midnight of the Century" (1997)
  - "Omertà" (1998)
- Monsters
  - "Glim-Glim" (1989)
  - "A New Woman" (1990)
- NOS4A2
  - "Welcome To Christmasland" (2020)
- Night Gallery
  - "The Messiah on Mott Street" (1971)
- Nowhere Man
  - "It's Not Such a Wonderful Life" (Season 1, Episode 12) (1995)
- The Originals
  - "The Map of Moments" (2014)
  - "Savior" (2015)
- Outlander
  - "Freedom and Whisky" (2017)
- The Outer Limits
  - "The Conversion" (1995)
- The Purge
  - "Happy Holidays" (2019)
- Pushing Daisies
  - "Corpsicle" (2007)
- Quantum Leap
  - "A Little Miracle" (1990)
  - "Promised Land" (1992)
- Roswell
  - "A Roswell Christmas Carol" (2000)
  - "Samuel Rising" (2001)
- Sliders
  - "Season's Greedings" (1996)
- So Weird
  - "Fountain" (1999)
- Space: Above and Beyond
  - "'The River of Stars" (1995)
- Starman
  - "The Gift" (1986)
- Supernatural
  - "A Very Supernatural Christmas" (2007)
- Supernatural
  - "The Spear" (2018)
- Taken
  - "Jacob and Jesse" (2002)
- Tales from the Crypt
  - "And All Through the House" (1989)
- Tales from the Darkside
  - "Seasons of Belief" (1986)
  - "The Yattering and Jack" (1987)
- Tru Calling
  - " 'Twas the Night Before Christmas...Again" (2008)
- The Twilight Zone
  - The Twilight Zone - 1959
    - "The Night of the Meek" (1960)
    - "Five Characters in Search of an Exit" (1961)
    - "The Changing of the Guard" (1962)
  - The Twilight Zone - 1985
    - "The Night of the Meek" reboot (1985)
- V: The Series
  - "Reflections in Terror" (1984)
- The Vampire Diaries
  - "O Come, All Ye Faithful" (2012)
  - "Christmas Through Your Eyes" (2014)
  - "Cold As Ice" (2015)
  - "The Next Time I Hurt Somebody, It Could Be You" (2016)
- Voyagers!
  - "Merry Christmas, Bogg" (Season 1, Episode 11) (1982)
- Warehouse 13
  - "Secret Santa" (2010)
  - "The Greatest Gift" (2011)
- What If...?
  - "Happy Hogan Saved Christmas?" (2023)
- The X-Files
  - "Christmas Carol" (1997)
  - "Emily" (1997)
  - "How the Ghosts Stole Christmas" (1998)

==== Superheroes ====
- Arrow
  - "Year's End" (2012)
  - "Three Ghosts" (2013)
  - "The Climb" (2014)
  - "Dark Waters" (2015)
  - "What We Leave Behind" (2016)
- Buffy the Vampire Slayer
  - "Amends" (1998)
- The Flash
  - "The Man in the Yellow Suit" (2014)
  - "Running To Stand Still" (2015)
  - "The Present" (2016)
  - "Don't Run" (2017)
- Hercules: The Legendary Journeys
  - "A Star to Guide Them" (1996)
- Legends of Tomorrow
  - "Turncoat" (2017)
  - "Beebo the God of War" (2017)
- Lois & Clark: The New Adventures of Superman
  - "Season's Greedings" (1994)
  - "Home Is Where the Hurt Is" (1995)
  - "'Twas the Night Before Mxymas" (1996)
- Power Rangers
  - Mighty Morphin Power Rangers
    - "Alpha's Magical Christmas" (1994)
    - "I'm Dreaming of a White Ranger" (1995)
  - Power Rangers Beast Morphers
    - "Scrozzle's Revenge" (2019)
  - Power Rangers Dino Charge
    - "Race to Rescue Christmas" (2015)
  - Power Rangers Dino Fury
    - "Secret Santa" (2021)
  - Power Rangers Dino Supercharge
    - "Here Comes Heximas" (2016)
  - Power Rangers Megaforce
    - "The Robo Knight Before Christmas" (2013)
  - Power Rangers Ninja Steel
    - "Past, Presents, And Future" (2017)
  - Power Rangers Samurai
    - "Christmas Together, Friends Forever" (2011)
  - Power Rangers Super Ninja Steel
    - "The Poisy Show" (2018)
  - Power Rangers Super Samurai
    - "Stuck on Christmas" (2012)
  - Power Rangers Zeo
    - "A Season to Remember" (1996)
- The Six Million Dollar Man
  - "A Bionic Christmas Carol" (1976)
- Smallville
  - "Lexmas" (2005)
  - "Gemini" (2007)
- Supergirl
  - "Reign" (2017)
- Wonder Woman
  - "The Deadly Toys" (1977)
  - "Pot of Gold" (1978)
- Xena: Warrior Princess
  - "A Solstice Carol" (1996)

=== Sports Drama ===
- Friday Night Lights
  - "Always" (Season 5, Episode 13) (2011)
- The White Shadow
  - "Christmas Present" (Season 2, Episode 12) (1979)
  - "Christmas Story" (Season 3, Episode 5) (1980)

=== Teen Drama ===
- 90210 / Beverly Hills, 90210 / Melrose Place
  - 90210
    - "Winter Wonderland" (2009)
    - "Holiday Madness" (2010)
    - "O Holly Night" (2011)
    - "The Things We Do for Love" (2012)
  - Beverly Hills, 90210
    - "A Walsh Family Christmas" (Season 2, Episode 18) (December 19, 1991)
    - "It's a Totally Happening Life" (Season 3, Episode 16) (December 16, 1992)
    - "Somewhere in the World It's Christmas" (Season 4, Episode 15) (December 22, 1993)
    - "Christmas Comes This Time Each Year" (Season 5, Episode 15) (December 21, 1994)
    - "Angels We Have Heard on High" (Season 6, Episode 15) (December 20, 1995)
    - "Gift Wrapped" (Season 7, Episode 13) (December 18, 1996)
    - "Santa Knows" (Season 8, Episode 14) (December 17, 1997)
    - "Marathon Man" (Season 9, Episode 10) (December 20, 1998)
    - "Nine Yolks Whipped Lightly" (Season 10, Episode 12) (December 22, 1999)
  - Melrose Place
    - "A Melrose Place Christmas" (Season 1, Episode 18) (December 16, 1992)
    - "Under the Mistletoe" (Season 2, Episode 15) (December 22, 1993)
    - "Holiday on Ice" (Season 3, Episode 15) (December 19, 1994)
    - "Oy! to the World" (Season 4, Episode 15) (December 11, 1995)
    - "Crazy Love" (Season 5, Episode 13) (December 16, 1996)
    - "A Tree Talks in Melrose" (Season 6, Episode 13) (December 22, 1997)
    - "The Usual Santas" (Season 7, Episode 19) (December 21, 1998)
- Big Bad Beetleborgs
  - "Christmas Bells and Phantom's Spells" (1996)
- Boston Public
  - "Chapter Twenty-Nine" (2001)
- The Carrie Diaries
  - "The Second Time Around" (2013)
- Chasing Life
  - "Locks of Love" (2014)
- Cruel Summer
  - "All I Want for Christmas" (2023)
- Dawson's Creek
  - "Self Reliance" (2000)
  - "Merry Mayhem" (2002)
- Felicity
  - "And to All a Good Night" (2000)
  - "A Perfect Match" (2001)
- The Fosters
  - "Christmas Past" (2014)
- Good Trouble
  - "Nochebuena" (2019)
  - "A Very Coterie Christmas" (2019)
- Gossip Girl
  - "Roman Holiday" (2007)
  - "The Townie" (2010)
  - 2021
    - "You Can't Take It with Jules" (2021)
- The Journey of Allen Strange
  - "Starwalk" (1997)
- My So-Called Life
  - "So-Called Angels" (1994)
- The O.C.
  - "The Best Chrismukkah Ever" (2003)
  - "The Chrismukkah That Almost Wasn't" (2004)
  - "The Chrismukkah Bar-Mitzvahkkah" (2005)
  - "The Chrismukk-huh?" (2006)
- Party of Five / Time of Your Life
  - Party of Five
    - "Christma" (1996)
    - "S'Wunnerful Life" (1997)
    - "One Christmas, to Go" (1998)
  - Time of Your Life
    - "Time of Your Life: "The Time They Had Not" (1999)
- Popular
  - "Fall on Your Knees" (Season 1, Episode 10) (December 9, 1999)
  - "The Consequences of Falling" (Season 2, Episode 10) (December 15, 2000)
- Pretty Little Liars
  - "How the 'A' Stole Christmas" (2014)
  - Pretty Little Liars: The Perfectionists
    - "Hook, Line and Booker" (2019)
  - Pretty Little Liars: Original Sin
    - "Chapter Ten: Final Girls" (2022)
- Riverdale
  - "Chapter Twenty-Two: Silent Night, Deadly Night" (2017)
- State of Grace
  - "Holiday on Ice" (2002)
- The Secret Life of the American Teenager
  - "Hedy's Happy Holiday House" (2012)
- The Secret World of Alex Mack
  - "The Gift" (1995)
- Switched at Birth
  - "Yuletide Fortune Tellers" (2014)
- TV 101
  - "Home" (1988)
- Veronica Mars
  - "An Echolls Family Christmas" (Season 1, Episode 10) (December 14, 2004)
  - "One Angry Veronica" (Season 2, Episode 10) (December 7, 2005)

=== Westerns ===
- Annie Oakley
  - "Santa Claus Wears a Gun" (Season 3, Episode 27) (1956)
- Bonanza
  - "Gabrielle" (Season 3, Episode 14) (1961)
  - "A Christmas Story" (Season 8, Episode 15) (1966)
- The Adventures of Jim Bowie
  - "The Return of the Alcibiade" (Season 1, Episode 16) (1956)
- The Big Valley
  - "Judgement in Heaven" (Season 1, Episode 15) (1965)
- Branded
  - "A Proud Town" (Season 2, Episode 15) (1965)
- The Californians
  - "Truce of the Tree" (Season 1, Episode 13) (1957)
- Cimarron City
  - "Cimarron Holiday" (Season 1, Episode 11) (1958)
- Daniel Boone
  - "The Christmas Story" (Season 2, Episode 14) (1965)
- The Deputy
  - "The Orphans" (Season 1, Episode 15) (1959)
- Dr. Quinn, Medicine Woman
  - "Mike's Dream...a Christmas Tale" (Season 2, Episode 10) (1993)
  - "The First Christmas" (Season 3, Episode 12) (1994)
  - "Fifi's First Christmas" (Season 4, Episode 11) (1995)
  - "Season of Miracles" (Season 5, Episode 13) (1996)
- Fury
  - "The Wayfarer" (Season 3, Episode 11) (1957)
- The Gray Ghost
  - "Rebel Christmas" (Season 1, Episode 10) (1957)
- Gunsmoke
  - "Magnus" (Season 1, Episode 12) (1955)
  - "P.S. Murry Christmas" (Season 17, Episode 15) (1971)
- Have Gun - Will Travel
  - "The Hanging Cross" (Season 1, Episode 15) (1957))
  - "Be Not Forgetful of Strangers" (Season 6, Episode 15) (1962)
- Here Come the Brides
  - "A Christmas Place" (Season 1, Episode 11) (1968)
- Laramie
  - "A Sound of Bells" (Season 2, Episode 13) (1960)
- The Life and Times of Grizzly Adams
  - "Once Upon a Starry Night" (Season 2, Episode 24) (1978)
- Little House on the Prairie
  - "Pilot" (Made-for-Television Film) (1974)
  - "Christmas at Plum Creek" (Season 1, Episode 15) (1974)
  - "Blizzard" (Season 3, Episode 11) (1976)
  - "A Christmas They Never Forgot" (Season 8, Episode 11) (1981)
  - "Little House: "Bless All the Dear Children" (1984)
- The Lone Ranger
  - "Christmas Story" (Season 5, Episode 15) (1956)
- Rawhide
  - "Twenty-Five Santa Clauses" (Season 4, Episode 12) (1961)
- The Restless Gun
  - "The Child" (Season 1, Episode 14) (1957)
  - "A Bell for Santo Domingo" (Season 2, Episode 13) (1958)
- Stagecoach West
  - "Three Wise Men" (Season 1, Episode 11) (1960)
- Tales of Wells Fargo
  - "Laredo" (Season 2, Episode 16) (1957)
  - "The Happy Tree" (Season 3, Episode 15) (1958)
- The Tall Man
  - "Billy's Baby" (Season 1, Episode 15) (1960)
- The Texan
  - "A Time of the Year" (Season 1, Episode 13) (1958)
- Wagon Train
  - "The Mary Ellen Thomas Story" (Season 2, Episode 12) (1958)
  - "The St. Nicholas Story" (Season 3, Episode 12) (1959)
- Wanted: Dead or Alive
  - "Eight Cent Reward" (Season 1, Episode 16) (1958)
- The Wild Wild West
  - "The Night of the Whirring Death" (Season 1, Episode 20) (1966)
- Yancy Derringer
  - "Old Dixie" (Season 1, Episode 12) (1958)
- Zorro (1990 TV series)
  - "It's a Wonderful Zorro" (Season 2, Episode 14) (1990)
  - "Miracle of the Pueblo" (Season 3, Episode 12) (1991)

== Reality shows ==
- 7 Little Johnstons
  - "The Nightmare Before Christmas" (2019)
  - "Holiday Hangover" (2021)
  - "A White-ish Christmas" (2025)
- 19 Kids and Counting
  - "O Come All Ye Duggars" (2009)
  - "Duggars and Bates Reunion" (2009)
  - "Josie Duggar's First Christmas" (2010)
- 1000-lb Sisters
  - "I Candy-cane't" (2024)
- American Chopper
  - "OCC Holiday Special 1 (Santa Bike)" (2003)
  - "OCC Holiday Special 2 (Sleigh Bike)" (2004)
  - "Christmas Sleigh" (2004)
- The Anna Nicole Show
  - "The Anna Nicole Holiday Special" (2002)
- The Ashlee Simpson Show
  - "Jingle Ball Rock" (2005)
- Baked with Love: Holiday
  - (Hallmark Channel series)
- The Bradshaw Bunch
  - "A Very Bradshaw Christmas" (2021)
- Bringing Up Bates
  - "Tori's Winter Wonderland Wedding" (2018)
  - " 'Tis the Season for Surprises" (2021)
- Cake Boss
  - "Santa, Sunrise, and Snowmen Cupcakes" (2010)
  - "Seasons Greetings and Saintly Surprises" (2018)
  - "Nutcracker, Gingerbread and Carlo's Christmas Carol" (2020)
- Celebrations with Lacey Chabert
  - "Ifunanya's Christmas Extravaganza" (2024)
- Chrisley Knows Best / Growing Up Chrisley:
  - "A Very Chrisley Christmas" (2014)
  - "A Very Chrisley Christmas 2" (2015)
  - "Young St. Nic" (2019)
  - "Christmas Special" (2020)
  - "Holiday Celebration" (2020)
  - "A Very Chrisley Fixmas" (2021)
  - "Baa Humbug" (2021)
- Christmas at Sea
  - (Hallmark Channel series)
- Dr. Pimple Popper
  - "The 12 Pops of Christmas" (2018)
  - "Season's Squeezings" (2020)
  - A Pimple Carol (2021)
  - "With Every Cyst-mas Card I Write" (2022)
- Duck Dynasty
  - "I'm Dreaming of a Redneck Christmas" (December 5, 2012)
  - "O Little Town of West Monroe" (December 11, 2013)
  - "A Home for the Holidays" (December 10, 2014)
- Extreme Cheapskates
  - "An Extreme Cheapskates Christmas" (2014)
- The Family Chantel
  - "Home for the Holidays" (2021)
- Finding Mr. Christmas
  - (Hallmark Channel series)
- Flipping Out
  - "A Very Lewis Christmas" (2018)
- Ghost Hunters
  - "Ghosts of Christmas Past" (2010)
  - "Christmas Spirit" (2011)
  - "Haunted Home for the Holidays" (2012)
- The Girls Next Door
  - "Snow Place Like Home" (2007)
- The Great Christmas Light Fight
  - (2013 ABC series)
- Gypsy Sisters
  - "A Naughty or Nice Christmas?" (2014)
- Here Comes Honey Boo Boo / Mama June: From Not to Hot
  - "A Very Poo Christmas" (2013)
  - "One Last Family Christmas" (2024)
- The Hills
  - "Somebody Always Has to Cry" (2006)
- Jay & Pamela
  - "I'll Be Santa, You'll Be Vixen" (2026)
- Jersey Shore: Family Vacation
  - "12 Days of Jerzmas" (2021)
- Jon & Kate Plus 8
  - "Shopping For Ten" (2007)
  - "Gosselin Family Christmas" (2008)
  - "Puppies!" (2009)
- The Kardashians
  - "Stick Up Your Ass" (2024)
- Keeping Up with the Kardashians
  - "A Very Merry Christmas" (2013)
  - "A Very Kardashian Holiday" (2017)
  - "The Nightmare Before Christmas" (2018)
  - "Christmas Chaos" (2019)
- Ladies of London
  - "The Barefoot Baroness" (2015)
- The Legend of Shelby the Swamp Man
  - "A Very Shelby Christmas" (2013)
- The Little Couple
  - "A Very Klein Christmas" (2012)
  - "A Little Holiday Spirit" (2015)
- Little People, Big World
  - "Merry Little Christmas" (2006)
  - "A Roloff Winter Wonderland" (2016)
  - "Grandkids' First Christmas" (2018)
- Long Island Medium
  - "Christmas Spirit" (2012)
  - "Christmas at the Caputo's" (2013)
  - "Christmas Special" (2014)
- Married to Medicine
  - "Holi-slay" (2022)
- Married to Medicine: Los Angeles
  - "Christmas in Beverly Hills" (2020)
- Meet the Barkers
  - "Christmas" (2005)
  - "The $10,000 Christmas Tree" (2006)
  - "An Alabama Christmas" (2006)
- My Big Fat Fabulous Life
  - "All I Want for Christmas" (2024)
- Newlyweds: Nick and Jessica
  - "A Newlyweds Christmas" (2004)
- The Osbournes
  - "A Very Ozzy Christmas" (2002)
- OutDaughtered
  - "Dreaming of a Cajun Christmas" (2018)
  - "Silent Night, Holy Slime" (2021)
- Pawn Stars
  - "A Christmas Special" (2009)
  - "Secret Santa" (2009)
  - "It's a Wonderful Pawn" (2012)
  - "Santa Chum" (2012)
  - "A Very Vegas Christmas" (2013)
  - "Another Christmas Story" (2013)
  - "The Pawn Before Christmas" (2015)
- The Real Housewives Franchise
  - Bethenny Ever After
    - "Thin Ice, Ugly Sweaters" (2011)
    - "Fair Thee Well Heeled" (2012)
  - The Real Housewives of Atlanta
    - "Who's Been Naughty, Who's Been Nice" (2016)
    - "How the Wig Stole Christmas" (2021)
  - The Real Housewives of Beverly Hills
    - "Season's Grillings" (2021)
  - The Real Housewives of Dallas
    - "Hollman Holiday" (2016)
  - The Real Housewives of New Jersey
    - "Holidazed and Confused" (2011)
    - " 'Twas the Fight Before Christmas" (2011)
    - "There Arose Such a Clatter" (2011)
    - "A Very Jersey Christmas" (2011)
    - "Oh Christmas, Tre" (2014)
    - "Jingle Bells and Prison Cells" (2016)
    - "A Very Hairy Christmas" (2016)
  - The Real Housewives of New York City
    - "You Want to What Me in the Where" (2012)
    - "This Party Is Toast" (2012)
    - "December: Berkshires County" (2016)
    - "Unhappy Holidays" (2016)
    - "A Countess No More" (2017)
    - "Holidazed and Confused" (2018)
    - "It's Not You, It's Miami" (2019)
    - "Jesus, the Countess, and Joseph...has the Christmas Cabaret" (2019)
    - "Baby, It's Cold Inside" (2021)
    - "Ho Ho Holidays" (2021)
    - "Oh Christmas Tree!" (2023)
  - The Real Housewives of Orange County
    - "Pretty Ugly" (2014)
    - "Not So Silent Night" (2014)
  - The Real Housewives of Potomac
    - 'Deck the Halls With Drama' (2020)
- Say Yes to the Dress
  - "A Very Merry Wedding" (2013)
- Sister Wives
  - "The Brown Family Decision" (2011)
  - "Sister Wives Separated" (2012)
  - "Christmas Surprise" (2013)
  - "A Not So Merry Christmas" (2020)
- Southern Charm
  - "Ho, Ho, Ho" (2018)
  - "Wreck the Halls" (2022)
- Teen Mom
  - "Taking It Up a Notch" (2011)
  - "Blue Christmas" (2017)
- Teen Mom 2
  - "Home for Christmas" (2012)
- Terry Crews Saves Christmas
  - (2016 USA Network series)
- T.I. & Tiny: The Family Hustle
  - "A Very Harris Christmas" (2012)
- Toddlers & Tiaras
  - "Southern Celebrity Glitzmas" (2011)
  - "Universal Royalty Christmas" (2012)
- Viva La Bam
  - "Very Merry Margera Christmas" (November 30, 2003)

== Children's series ==
=== Live-action ===
- The Adventures of Mary-Kate & Ashley: "The Case of the Christmas Caper" (1995)
- Baby Einstein: "Baby Santa's Music Box" (2000)
- Baby Faith: "God Made Christmas" (2006)
- Baby Songs: "Christmas" (1991)
- Bozo the Clown: Bozo, Gar and Ray: WGN TV Classics (2005, compilation of clips from 1960 to 2001)
- Brainy Baby: "Jingle Bells" (2005)
- The Big Comfy Couch: "Comfy And Joy" (Season 4, Episode 13) (1995)
- The Hardy Boys/Nancy Drew Mysteries: Will the Real Santa Claus...?" (Season 2, Episode 12) (1977)
- Kidsongs: "We Wish You a Merry Christmas" (1992)
- Kindergarten (TV series): Hooray for Holidays (2001)
- Masked Rider: "Ferbus' First Christmas" (Season 1, Episode 12) (1995)
- Pee-wee's Playhouse Christmas Special (1988)
- Say, Sing and Sign: "Christmas Carols and Hymns (2000)
- Shining Time Station: 'Tis A Gift (1990)
- Shirley Temple's Storybook: "Babes in Toyland" (Season 2, Episode 14) (1960)
- VR Troopers: "Santa's Secret Trooper" (Season 2, Episode 27) (1995)
- Wee Sing: "The Best Christmas Ever" (1990)
- You're Invited to Mary-Kate & Ashley's: "You're Invited to Mary-Kate & Ashley's Christmas Party" (1997)

==== Fraggle Rock/Fraggle Rock: Back to the Rock ====
- "The Bells of Fraggle Rock" (Season 4, Episode 13) (1995)
- "Night of the Lights Holiday Special" (Season 1, Episode 14) (2022)
- "The First Snow of Fraggle Rock" (Season 2, Episode 14) (2025)
- "Fraggle Rock: A Holiday Gift" (Season 2, Episode 15) (2026)

==== Lassie ====
- "The Christmas Story 1958" (Season 5, Episode 16) (1958)
- "The Christmas Story 1960" (Season 7, Episode 15) (1960)
- "Yochim's Christmas" (Season 8, Episode 15) (1961)
- "Lassie's Gift of Love" (Season 10, Episode 11-12) (1963)
- "The Little Christmas Tree" (Season 11, Episode 15) (1964)
- "The Greatest Gift" (Season 13, Episode 14) (1966)
- "Miracle of the Dove" (Season 14, Episode 15) (1967)
- "The Blessing" (Season 16, Episode 12) (1969)

==== Cartoon Network/Discovery Family ====
- The Aquabats! Super Show!:
  - "Christmas With The Aquabats!" (Season 2, Episode 6) (2013)
- R.L. Stine's The Haunting Hour:
  - "A Creature Was Stirring" (Season 1, Episode 3) (2010)
  - "Goodwill Toward Men" (Season 4, Episode 10) (2014)
- Spooksville:
  - "The No-Ones" (Season 1, Episode 10) (2013)

==== Disney Channel, Disney XD and Disney Jr. ====
- Bluey (TV series):
  - "Verandah Santa" (2019)
  - "Christmas Swim" (2020)
- Doraemon: Gadget Cat from the Future:
  - "What Day is it Today" (Season 1, Episode 25B) (2014)
  - "Snowkid on the Block" (Season 2, Episode 12B) (2015)
- Electric Bloom: "How We Defeated a Jingle Bell Bully" (Season 1, Episode 15) (2025)
- Imagination Movers:
  - "Present Problem" (Season 1, Episode 21) (2008)
  - "Happy Ha Ha Holidays!" (Season 2, Episode 9) (2009)
  - "A Little Elf Esteem" (Season 3, Episode 10) (2011)

==== Nickelodeon/Nick Jr. ====
- Allegra's Window:
  - "Waiting for Grandma" (Season 1, Episode 17) (1994)
  - "Mr. Cook's Christmas" (Season 3, Episode 12) (1996)
- Blue's Clues:
  - "Blue's Big Holiday" (Season 3, Episode 9) (1999)
  - "Blue's First Holiday" (Season 5, Episode 36) (2003)
- Blue's Clues & You!:
  - "Blue's Night Before Christmas" (Season 2, Episode 8) (2020)
  - "A Blue's Clues Festival of Lights" (Season 3, Episode 4) (2021)
  - "Blue's Snowy Day Surprise" (Season 3, Episode 5) (2021)
  - "A Blue Christmas with You" (Season 4, Episode 6) (2022)
- Blue's Room: "Holiday Wishes" (Season 1, Episode 3) (2004)
- Eureeka's Castle: "Christmas at Eureeka's" (Season 1, Episode 20) (1989)
- Nick Jr Face:
  - "Face Loves Snow" (1996)
  - "Face Wishes Us a Happy Holidays" (1996)
  - "Face Loves Wintertime" (1996)
  - "Face Practices His Special Christmas Greeting" (1997)
  - "Face Says Merry Christmas" (1997)
  - "Face Is Cold" (1998)
- The Fresh Beat Band: "Fresh Beats in Toyland" (Season 2, Episode 7) (2010)
- Gullah Gullah Island: "A Gullah Gullah Christmas" (Season 2, Episode 19) (1996)
- LazyTown:
  - "Surprise Santa" (Season 1, Episode 29) (2005)
  - "The Holiday Spirit" (Season 3, Episode 13) (2013)
- Moose and Zee:
  - "Winter is a Wonderland" (2003)
  - "Warm And Fuzzy" (2005)
  - "I Only Want a Candy Cane This Year" (2005)
- Ryan's Mystery Playdate: "Ryan's Merry Playdate" (Season 2, Episode 10) (2019)
- The Tiny Chef Show: The Marvelous Mish Mash Special (2023)
- The Wubbulous World of Dr. Seuss: "Mrs. Zabarelli's Holiday Baton" (Season 1, Episode 8) (1996)
- Yo Gabba Gabba!:
  - "Christmas" (Season 1, Episode 18) (2007)
  - "A Very Awesome Christmas" (Season 4, Episode 3) (2011)

=== Animation ===
==== Cartoon Network/Boomerang/Discovery Family ====
- Adventure Time:
  - "Holly Jolly Secrets" (Season 3, Episodes 19-20) (2011)
  - "The More You Moe, The Moe You Know" (Season 7, Episode 14) (2015)
- The Adventures of Chuck and Friends:
  - "Up All Night/Boomer the Snowplow" (Season 1, Episode 8) (2010)
  - "The Regifters" (Season 2, Episode 12) (2011)
- Almost Naked Animals:
  - "The Ear Wax Elf" (Season 1, Episode 5) (2011)
  - "The Perfect Gift/Home for the Howiedays" (Season 1, Episode 26) (2011)
- The Amazing World of Gumball / The Wonderfully Weird World of Gumball
  - "Christmas" (Season 2, Episode 15) (2012)
  - "The Lie" (Season 3, Episode 26) (2014)
  - "The Cheapmas" (Season 2, Episode 6) (2025)
- Angelo Rules
  - "Angelo, Wake Up! It's Christmas!" (Season 5, Episode 0) (2021)
- Apple & Onion:
  - "Christmas Spirit" (Season 2, Episode 10) (2020)
- Atomic Betty:
  - "Jingle Brawls / Toy Hystoryia" (Season 1, Episode 25) (2005)
  - "The No-L 9" (Season 2, Episode 8) (2005)
- Batman: The Brave and the Bold:
  - "Invasion of the Secret Santas!" (Season 1, Episode 5) (2008)
- Batwheels:
  - "Holidays on Ice" (Season 1, Episode 17) (2022)
  - "The Great Christmas Caper" (Season 2, Episode 21) (2024)
- Ben 10 (2005 TV series):
  - "Merry Christmas" (Season 3, Episode 4) (2006)
- Ben 10 (2016 TV series):
  - "The Feels" (Season 2, Episode 28) (2018)
- Camp Lazlo:
  - "Kamp Kringle" (Season 5, Episode 9) (2007)
- Care Bears: Welcome to Care-a-Lot:
  - "Holiday Hics" (Season 1, Episode 12) (2012)
  - "Holi-Stage" (Season 1, Episode 24) (2012)
- Casper's Scare School:
  - "Merry Scary Christmas" (Season 1, Episode 11) (2009)
- Casper the Friendly Ghost: True Boo (1952)
- Chowder:
  - "Hey, Hey It's Knishmas!" (Season 2, Episode 4) (2008)
- Clarence:
  - "Merry Moochmas" (Season 2, Episode 37) (2016)
- Class of 3000:
  - "The Class of 3000 Christmas Special" (Season 2, Episode 9-10) (2007)
- Code Lyoko:
  - "Cold War" (Season 2, Episode 19) (2005)
  - "Distant Memory" (Season 4, Episode 16) (2007)
- Codename: Kids Next Door:
  - "Operation: S.N.O.W.I.N.G." (Season 4, Episode 10) (2005)
  - "Operation: N.A.U.G.H.T.Y." (Season 5, Episode 2) (2005)
- Courage the Cowardly Dog:
  - "The Snowman Cometh" (Season 1, Episode 10 Part 1) (2000)
  - "Snowman's Revenge" (Season 3, Episode 11 Part 2) (2002)
  - "The Nutcracker" (Season 4, Episode 1 Part 2) (2002)
- Craig of the Creek:
  - "Snow Day" (Season 3, Episode 18) (2020)
  - "Winter Break" (Season 3, Episode 19) (2021)
  - "Winter Creeklympics" (Season 3, Episode 22) (2021)
  - "Locked Out Cold" (Season 4, Episode 2) (2021)
- Dan Vs.:
  - "The Mall Santa" (Season 2, Episode 2) (2011)
- Dexter's Laboratory:
  - "Dexter vs. Santa's Claws" (Season 2, Episode 47c) (1998)
  - "Trapped With a Vengeance" (Season 2, Episode 50b) (1998)
  - "A Mom Cartoon" (Season 3, Episode 13b) (2002)
- Dorothy and the Wizard of Oz:
  - "Dorothy's Christmas in Oz" (2018)
- Ed, Edd n Eddy:
  - "Fa, La, La, La, Ed" (Season 2, Episode 13) (2000)
  - "Ed, Edd n Eddy's Jingle Jingle Jangle" (2004)
- Evil Con Carne:
  - "Christmas Con Carne" (Season 1, Episode 8 Part 3) (2002)
- Foster's Home for Imaginary Friends:
  - "A Lost Claus" (Season 3, Episode 10) (2005)
- The Garfield Show:
  - "Caroling Capers" (Season 1, Episode 20 Part 1) (2009)
  - "Home for the Holidays" (Season 2, Episode 1) (2010)
- George of the Jungle:
  - "Jungle Bells/The Goats of Christmas Presents" (Season 1, Episode 23) (2007)
- G.I. Joe: Renegades:
  - "Homecoming, Parts 1 & 2" (Season 1, Episode 11 & 12) (2010)
- The Grim Adventures of Billy & Mandy:
  - "A Dumb Wish" (Season 1, Episode 13 Part 3) (2001)
  - "Billy and Mandy Save Christmas" (Season 4, Episode 14) (2005)
- Hero: 108:
  - "Dog Castle" (Season 1, Episode 10) (2010)
- The Heroic Quest of the Valiant Prince Ivandoe:
  - "The Prince and The Lonely Trollstress" (Season 5, Episode 3) (2023)
- The High Fructose Adventures of Annoying Orange:
  - "The Annoying Orange Generic Holiday Special" (Season 1, Episode 19) (2012)
  - "Orange Carol" (Season 1, Episode 20) (2012)
  - "Fruitsy the Snowfruit" (Season 2, Episode 21) (2013)
- I Am Weasel:
  - "Happy Baboon Holidays" (Season 1, Episode 11) (1997)
  - "IR's First Bike" (Season 5, Episode 4) (1999)
- Johnny Bravo:
  - "'Twas the Night" (Season 1, Episode 5) (1997)
  - "A Johnny Bravo Christmas" (Season 3, Episode 18) (2001)
- Justice League:
  - "Comfort and Joy" (Season 2, Episode 23) (2003)
- Krypto the Superdog:
  - "Storybook Holiday" (Season 1, Episode 2) (2005)
- Krypto Saves the Day!: "Package Pandamonium" (Season 1, Episode 3) (2025)
- Littlest Pet Shop (2012):
  - "Winter Wonder Wha...?" (Season 3, Episode 14) (2014)
  - "Snow Stormin'" (Season 3, Episode 15) (2014)
- MAD:
  - "Da Grinchy Code/Duck" (Season 1, Episode 12) (2010)
  - "FROST/Undercover Claus" (Season 2, Episode 15) (2011)
  - "Fantastic Four Christmases/Red & White Collar" (Season 3, Episode 20) (2012)
- The Marvelous Misadventures of Flapjack:
  - "Low Tidings" (Season 2, Episode 12) (2009)
- The Mr. Men Show:
  - "Snow" (Season 1, Episode 6a) (2008)
- My Gym Partner's a Monkey:
  - "Have Yourself a Joyful Little Animas" (Season 2, Episode 9) (2006)
- OK K.O.! Let's Be Heroes:
  - "Super Black Friday" (Season 2, Episode 20) (2018)
- Pink Panther and Pals:
  - "Chilled to the Pink" (Season 1, Episode 13a) (2010)
- Pound Puppies (2010):
  - "I Heard the Barks on Christmas Eve" (Season 2, Episode 13) (2012)
- Robotboy:
  - "Christmas Evil" (Season 1, Episode 10b) (2005)
- Scaredy Squirrel:
  - "Lumberjack Day" (Season 1, Episode 5) (2011)
- Secret Millionaires Club:
  - "Just Say Snow!" (Season 1, Episode 16) (2013)
- Sheep in the Big City:
  - "Home for the Baa-lidays" (Season 1, Episode 6) (2000)
- Sidekick:
  - "Beneath the Missile-Toe/Ice to Know You" (Season 1, Episode 16) (2010)
- Space Ghost Coast to Coast:
  - "A Space Ghost Christmas" (Season 1, Episode 12) (1994)
  - "Waiting for Edward" (Season 5, Episode 11) (1998)
- Steven Universe:
  - "Winter Forecast" (Season 1, Episode 42) (2015)
  - "Maximum Capacity" (Season 1, Episode 43) (2015)
  - "Three Gems and a Baby" (Season 4, Episode 9) (2016)
- Steven Universe Future:
  - "Snow Day" (Season 1, Episode 7) (2019)
- Strawberry Shortcake's Berry Bitty Adventures:
  - "Happy First Frost" (Season 1, Episode 19) (2010)
  - "The Berry Long Winter" (Season 2, Episode 10) (2012)
  - "The Big Freeze" (Season 2, Episode 11) (2012)
  - "On Ice" (Season 2, Episode 12) (2012)
- ThunderCats Roar:
  - "Mandora Saves Christmas" (Season 1, Episode 52) (2020)
- The Tom and Jerry Show:
  - "The Plight Before Christmas" (Season 1, Episode 28) (2014)
  - "Tom and Jerry: Santa's Little Helpers" (2014)
  - "Dragon Down the Holidays" (Season 2, Episode 15) (2017)
- Totally Spies!:
  - "Evil G.L.A.D.I.S. much?" (Season 3, Episode 14) (2004)
  - "Ho-Ho-Ho-No!" (Season 5, Episode 23) (2010)
- Transformers: Animated:
  - "Human Error, Parts 1 & 2" (Season 3, Episode 8 & 9) (2007)
- Transformers: Rescue Bots:
  - "Christmas in July" (Season 1, Episode 9) (2012)
  - "The Riders of Midwinter" (Season 3, Episode 9) (2014)
- Transformers: Rescue Bots Academy:
  - "The Ice Wave" (Season 1, Episode 50) (2019)
- The Twisted Whiskers Show:
  - "Mister Mewser's Holiday Spectacular" (Season 1, Episode 26) (2010)
- Uncle Grandpa:
  - "Christmas Special" (Season 1, Episode 41) (2014)
  - "Secret Santa" (Season 2, Episode 23) (2015)
  - "Chill Out" (Season 4, Episode 9) (2016)
- Unikitty!:
  - "No Day Like Snow Day" (Season 1, Episode 3) (2017)
  - "Top of the Naughty List" (Season 1, Episode 39) (2018)
- Wacky Races (2017):
  - "It's a Wacky Life" (Season 1, Episode 18) (2017)
  - "Dashing Thru the Snow" (Season 1, Episode 20) (2017)
  - "Signed, Sealed, and Wacky" (Season 2, Episode 24) (2018)
- We Bare Bears:
  - "Christmas Parties" (Season 2, Episode 23) (2016)
  - "The Perfect Tree" (Season 3, Episode 36) (2017)
  - "Christmas Movies" (Season 4, Episode 25) (2018)
- What a Cartoon!:
  - "George and Junior's Christmas Spectacular" (Episode 14) (1995)

===== 6teen =====
- "Deck the Mall" (Season 1, Episode 5) (2004)
- "In a Retail Wonderland" (Season 2, Episode 8) (2005)
- "Snow Job" (Season 2, Episode 27) (2006)
- "How the Rent-A-Cop Stole Christmas" (Season 3, Episode 12) (2007)

===== Cloudy with a Chance of Meatballs =====
- "Lobster Claus Is Coming to Town" (2017)
- "Have Yourself a Sardiney Little Christmas" (2018)

===== My Little Pony: Friendship Is Magic =====
- "Hearth's Warming Eve" (Season 2, Episode 11) (2011)
- "Hearthbreakers" (Season 5, Episode 20) (2015)
- "A Hearth's Warming Tail" (Season 6, Episode 8) (2016)
- "The Hearth's Warming Club" (Season 8, Episode 15) (2018)
- "My Little Pony: Best Gift Ever" (2018)

===== The Powerpuff Girls =====
- "'Twas the Fight Before Christmas" (2003)
- "You're a Good Man, Mojo Jojo!" (Season 2, Episode 29) (2017)
- "The Gift" (Season 3, Episode 22) (2018)

===== Regular Show =====
- "The Christmas Special" (Season 4, Episode 9) (2012)
- "New Year's Kiss" (Season 5, Episode 14) (2013)
- "White Elephant Gift Exchange" (Season 6, Episode 9) (2014)
- "Merry Christmas Mordecai" (Season 6, Episode 10) (2014)
- "Christmas in Space" (Season 8, Episode 23) (2016)

===== Teen Titans Go! =====
- "Second Christmas" (Season 1, Episode 35) (2013)
- "The True Meaning of Christmas" (Season 3, Episode 19) (2015)
- "Halloween v Christmas" (Season 4, Episode 2) (2015)
- "Teen Titans Save Christmas" (Season 4, Episode 6) (2016)
- "Beast Boy on a Shelf" (Season 6, Episode 3) (2019)
- "Christmas Crusaders" (Season 6, Episode 4) (2019)
- "A Holiday Story" (Season 7, Episode 32) (2021)
- "The Great Holiday Escape" (Season 8, Episode 2) (2022)
- "Christmas Magic" (Season 8, Episode 27) (2023)
- "White Elephant" (Season 9, Episode 32) (2025)

===== Total Drama =====
- Total Drama World Tour:
  - "Anything Yukon Do, I Can Do Better" (Season 3, Episode 4) (2010)
  - "Slap Slap Revolution" (Season 3, Episode 7) (2010)
  - "Sweden Sour" (Season 3, Episode 17) (2010)
- Total Drama: Revenge of the Island:
  - "Ice Ice Baby" (Season 4, Episode 3) (2012)
- Total DramaRama:
  - "Snow Way Out" (Season 1, Episode 28) (2018)
  - "Me, My Elf, and I" (Season 2, Episode 34) (2020)
  - "Snow Country for Old Men" (Season 2, Episode 37) (2020)
  - "The Tree Stooges Save Christmas" (Season 3, Episode 36 & 37) (2021)

==== Disney Channel/Jetix/Disney XD/Disney+ ====
- The 7D:
  - "Gingersnaps and Grumpy Snaps/Jollybells" (Season 1, Episode 18) (2014)
- 101 Dalmatians: The Series:
  - "A Christmas Cruella" (Season 1, Episode 49) (1997)
- American Dragon: Jake Long:
  - "Hairy Christmas" (Season 2, Episode 16) (2006)
- Amphibia:
  - "Froggy Little Christmas" (Season 3, Episode 9) (2021)
- Atomic Puppet:
  - "Snow Maniac/Hero's Holiday" (Season 1, Episode 18) (2017)
- Big City Greens:
  - "Green Christmas" (Season 2, Episode 4) (2019)
  - "Big Resolution/Winter Greens" (Season 2, Episode 23) (2021)
  - "Virtually Christmas" (Season 3, Episode 29) (2022)
  - "Dream Tree/Blue Greens" (Season 4, Episode 12) (2024)
  - Forever Christmas (Season 5, Episode 9a) (2026)
- Big Hero 6: The Series:
  - "The Present" (Season 2, Episode 18) (2019)
- Brandy & Mr. Whiskers:
  - "On Whiskers, On Lola, On Cheryl and Meryl" (Season 1, Episode 13) (2004)
- Buzz Lightyear of Star Command:
  - "Holiday Time" (Season 1, Episode 59) (2000)
- Chibiverse:
  - "The Doof That Ruined Christmas" (Season 4, Episode 5) (2026)
- Chip 'n' Dale: Park Life:
  - "Park Life Holiday" (Season 2, Episode 13) (2023)
- Counterfeit Cat:
  - "Merry Christmax" (Season 1, Episode 12) (2016)
  - "Low Resolutions" (Season 1, Episode 24) (2016)
- Doug:
  - "Doug's Secret Christmas" (Season 1, Episode 15) (1996)
- DuckTales (2017):
  - "Last Christmas!" (Season 2, Episode 6) (2018)
  - "How Santa Stole Christmas!" (Season 3, Episode 18) (2020)
- Elena of Avalor:
  - "Navidad" (Season 1, Episode 11) (2016)
  - "Snow Place Like Home" (Season 2, Episode 19) (2018)
  - "Festival Of Lights" (Season 3, Episode 17) (2019)
- The Emperor's New School:
  - "A Giftmas Story" (Season 2, Episode 12) (2007)
- Fish Hooks:
  - "Merry Fishmas, Milo" (Season 2, Episode 24) (2011)
- The Ghost and Molly McGee:
  - "Festival of Lights/Saving Christmas" (Season 1, Episode 10) (2021)
  - "Ice Princess/Ready, Set, Snow!" (Season 1, Episode 11) (2022)
  - "White Christmess" (Season 2, Episode 19) (2023)
- Guardians of the Galaxy (TV series):
  - "Jingle Bell Rock" (Season 1, Episode 26) (2016)
- Hailey's On It!:
  - "We Wish You a Merry Chaos-mas" (Season 1, Episode 20) (2023)
- House of Mouse:
  - "Pete's Christmas Caper" (Season 3, Episode 19) (2002)
  - "Clarabelle's Christmas List" (Season 3, Episode 20) (2002)
- Hotel Transylvania: The Series:
  - "The Fright Before Creepmas" (Season 1, Episode 18) (2017)
  - "A Year Without Creepmas" (Season 2, Episode 14) (2019)
- Hulk and the Agents of S.M.A.S.H.:
  - "It's a Wonderful Smash" (Season 1, Episode 26) (2014)
- Jimmy Two-Shoes
  - "A Cold Day in Miseryville" (Season 1, Episode 5) (2009)
  - "Snowrilla" (Season 2, Episode 19) (2011)
- Kick Buttowski: Suburban Daredevil:
  - "A Cousin Kyle Christmas/Snow Problem" (Season 2, Episode 17) (2011)
- Kid vs. Kat:
  - "Kid vs. Kat vs. Christmas Part 1 & 2" (Season 1, Episode 17) (2009)
- Kiff
  - "Halfway There Day" (Season 1, Episode 8) (2023)
  - "Kiff and Barry Save Halfway There Day" (Season 2, Episode 27) (2025)
- Kim Possible:
  - "A Very Possible Christmas" (Season 2, Episode 16) (2003)
- Lilo & Stitch: The Series:
  - "Topper: Experiment 025" (Season 1, Episode 21) (2003)
- Lloyd in Space:
  - "Cheery Theerlap, Lloyd" (Season 2, Episode 8) (2001)
- Mickey Mouse:
  - "Dancevidaniya" (Season 3, Episode 12) (2016)
  - "Duck the Halls: A Mickey Mouse Christmas Special" (Season 3, Episode 58) (2016)
- Mickey Mouse Works:
  - "The Nutcracker" (Season 1, Episode 13) (1999)
- Milo Murphy's Law:
  - "A Christmas Peril" (Season 1, Episode 20) (2017)
- Pac-Man and the Ghostly Adventures:
  - "Happy Holidays and a Merry Berry Day" (Season 2, Episode 13) (2014)
  - "Santa-Pac" (Season 3, Episode 12) (2015)
- Packages from Planet X:
  - "Christmas Evil/True North Strong & Freezing" (Season 1, Episode 17) (2013)
- Penn Zero: Part-Time Hero:
  - "North Pole Down" (Season 1, Episode 1) (2014)
- Pepper Ann:
  - "A Kosher Christmas" (Season 3, Episode 6) (1998)
- Pickle and Peanut:
  - "Springtime for Christmas/Yellow Snow/A Cabbage Day Miracle" (Season 1, Episode 10) (2015)
  - "Tree Lighting/A Merry Mocap Musical" (Season 2, Episode 17) (2017)
- Prep & Landing (2009)
- Prep & Landing: Operation: Secret Santa (2010)
- Prep & Landing: Naughty vs. Nice (2011)
- Prep & Landing: The Snowball Protocol (2025)
- The Proud Family / The Proud Family: Louder and Prouder:
  - "Seven Days of Kwanzaa" (Season 1, Episode 11) (2001)
  - "A Proud Family Wizmas" (television special) (2026)
- Randy Cunningham: 9th Grade Ninja:
  - "Silent Punch, Deadly Punch" (Season 1, Episode 15) (2012)
  - "Happy Hanukkah, Howard Weinerman/Snow Klahoma!" (Season 2, Episode 19) (2014)
- Rated A for Awesome:
  - "Melting the Ice" (Season 1, Episode 4) (2011)
  - "Silent Night, Awesome Night" (Season 1, Episode 36) (2011)
- The Replacements:
  - "Dick Daring's All-Star Holiday Stunt Spectacular V" (Season 3, Episode 22) (2008)
- Slugterra:
  - "Snowdance" (Season 2, Episode 2) (2013)
- Star vs. the Forces of Evil:
  - "Stump Day/Holiday Spellcial" (Season 3, Episode 14) (2017)
- Teamo Supremo:
  - "Happy Holidays, Mr. Gruff!" (Season 1, Episode 30) (2002)
- Tiny's Big Adventure (2009)
- Ultimate Spider-Man:
  - "Nightmare on Christmas" (Season 3, Episode 22) (2014)
  - "The Moon Knight Before Christmas" (Season 4, Episode 24) (2016)
- Wander Over Yonder:
  - "The Little Guy" (Season 1, Episode 7) (2013)
  - "The Gift" (Season 1, Episode 19) (2014)
- The Weekenders:
  - "The Worst Holiday Ever" (Season 3, Episode 13) (2001)
- Xiaolin Chronicles:
  - "Omi Saves the Holidays" (Season 1, Episode 21) (2015)
- Yin Yang Yo!
  - "Scarf It Up!" (Season 1, Episode 9) (2006)
  - "Season's Beatings" (Season 2, Episode 30) (2008)
- The ZhuZhus:
  - "Zhu Years Eve" (Season 1, Episode 9) (2017)
- Zombies: The Re-Animated Series:
  - "Santler Claws is Comin' to Town" (Special, Episode 20) (2024)

===== The Disney Afternoon =====
- TaleSpin: "A Jolly Molly Christmas" (Season 1, Episode 43) (1990)
- Darkwing Duck: "It's a Wonderful Leaf" (Season 1, Episode 41) (1991)
- Goof Troop: "Have Yourself a Goofy Little Christmas" (1992)
- Bonkers: "Miracle at 34th Precinct" (Season 1, Episode 59) (1993)
- The Shnookums & Meat Funny Cartoon Show: "Jingle Bells, Something Smells" (Season 1, Episode 12a) (1995)
- The Lion King's Timon & Pumbaa: "Don't Be Elfish" (Season 3, Episode 28a) (1999)

===== Phineas and Ferb =====
- "S'Winter" (Season 1, Episode 3) (2008)
- "Phineas and Ferb Christmas Vacation" (Season 2, Episode 22) (2009)
- "A Phineas and Ferb Family Christmas" (Season 3, Episode 17) (2011)
- "For Your Ice Only/Happy New Year!" (Season 4, Episode 2) (2012)
- "Doofenclaus and the Curse Of Pirate Santa" (Season 6, Episode 2) (2026)

===== Recess =====
- "Yes Mikey, Santa Does Shave" (Season 2, Episode 21) (1998)
- Recess Christmas: Miracle on Third Street (2001)

===== Teacher's Pet =====
- "A Dog For All Seasons" (Season 1, Episode 14) (2000)
- "The Blight Before Christmas" (Season 3, Episode 18) (2002)

==== Playhouse Disney/Disney Jr. ====
- Adventures in Wonderland: Christmas in Wonderland (Season 1, Episode 64) (1991)
- Alice's Wonderland Bakery:
  - "The Gingerbread Palace" (Season 1, Episode 21) (2022)
  - "A Hat-Bachi Hanukkah" (Season 2, Episode 14) (2023)
- Ariel:
  - "Flounder's Christmas Letter/Holiday Toy Box Trouble" (Season 1, Episode 18) (2024)
  - "A Crystal Christmas/The New Year Bubble" (Season 2, Episode 7) (2025)
  - "A Gift As Good As Gold" (Season 2, Episode 27) (2026)
- Bear in the Big Blue House
  - "A Berry Bear Christmas" (Season 3, Episode 25-26) (1999)
- Bluey (TV series):
  - "Verandah Santa" (2019)
  - "Christmas Swim" (2020)
- Charlie and Lola: "How Many More Minutes Until Christmas?" (Season 2, Episode 19) (2006)
- Doc McStuffins:
  - "A Very McStuffins Christmas" (Season 2, Episode 11) (2013)
  - "The Doc McStuffins Christmas Special" (Season 5, Episode 3) (2018)
- The Doodlebops: "Doodlebops Holiday Show" (Season 2, Episode 1) (2006)
- Doraemon: Gadget Cat from the Future:
  - "What Day is it Today" (Season 1, Episode 25B) (2014)
  - "Snowkid on the Block" (Season 2, Episode 12B) (2015)
- Eureka!: "Jingle Bog Rock" (Season 1, Episode 20A) (2022)
- Fancy Nancy: "Nancy and the Nice List" (Season 1, Episode 16) (2018)
- Firebuds:
  - "Hanukkah Hullabaloo/The Christmas Car-Sled Race" (Season 1, Episode 13) (2022)
  - "Blizzard Buds/Parade Escapade" (Season 2, Episode 5) (2023)
  - "Noche Buena Buds" (Season 3, Episode 8B) (2025)
- Handy Manny:
  - "A Very Handy Holiday" (Season 1, Episode 15) (2006)
  - "Flicker Saves Christmas" (Season 3, Episode 17) (2010)
  - "The Ayala's Christmas Extravaganza" (Season 3, Episode 18) (2010)
- Henry Hugglemonster:
  - "Happy Hugglemas" (Season 1, Episode 22) (2013)
  - "Henry Hugglemonster's Very Special Hugglemas TV Special" (Season 2, Episode 22) (2015)
- Higglytown Heroes: "Twinkle's Wish" (Season 1, Episode 12) (2004)
- Iron Man and His Awesome Friends:
  - "An Iron Man Christmas" (Season 1, Episode 15) (2025)
  - "A Very Iron Christmas/Hanukkah with the Iron Friends (Season 1, Episode 37) (2026)
- Jake and the Never Land Pirates:
  - "It's A Winter Never Land!/Hook on Ice!" (Season 1, Episode 24) (2011)
  - "Captain Scrooge!" (Season 3, Episode 25) (2014)
- Johnny and the Sprites: "Very Spritely Holiday/Sprites Snow Day" (Season 1, Episode 13) (2007)
- JoJo's Circus: "A Circus Town Christmas" (Season 1, Episode 18) (2003)
- Jungle Junction: "The Night Before Zipsmas/A Gift for Zooter" (Season 1, Episode 13) (2009)
- Kindergarten: The Musical: "A Winter's Walrus/One Holiday More" (Season 1, Episode 14) (2024)
- Little Einsteins:
  - "The Christmas Wish" (Season 1, Episode 15) (2005)
  - "The Wind-Up Toy Prince" (Season 2, Episode 20) (2007)
- Me & Mickey:
  - "Decorating for Christmas" (2023)
  - "Dreidel Play" (2023)
- Mickey and the Roadster Racers:
  - "Happy Hot Diggity Holiday/Happy Holiday Helpers" (Season 1, Episode 23) (2017)
  - "Snow-Go With the Flow/Happy Helpers on Ice!" (Season 2, Episode 16) (2018)
- Mickey Mouse Clubhouse
  - "Mickey Saves Santa" (Season 1, Episode 20) (2006)
- Mickey Mouse Clubhouse+
  - "The Twelve Pies of Christmas" (Season 2, Episode 12) (2026)
- Mickey Mouse Funhouse:
  - "Santa's Crash Landing" (Season 2, Episode 25) (2023)
  - "Nochebuena At the Funhouse/Hanukkah At Hilda's" (Season 3, Episode 19) (2024)
- Miles from Tomorrowland: "Snow Globe" (Season 1, Episode 29) (2015)
- Minnie's Bow-Toons:
  - "Oh Christmas Tree" (Season 3, Episode 5) (2013)
  - "Party Palace Pals!: Clarabelle's Christmas Sweater" (Season 6, Episode 16) (2021)
  - "Camp Minnie: Campground Christmas" (Season 8, Episode 10) (2023)
  - "Pet Hotel: Whoa Christmas Tree" (Season 9, Episode 11) (2025)
- Minnie Special: Minnie's Winter Bow Show (2014)
- Muppet Babies: "A Very Muppet Babies Christmas/Summer's Super Fabulous Holiday Surprise" ( Season 1, Episode 17) (2018)
- Out of the Box: "Happy Holidays" (Season 2, Episode 26) (1999)/ "Nutcracker Sweet" (Season 3, Episode 26) (2004)
- PB&J Otter: "The Ice Moose" (Season 2, Episode 18) (1999)
- PJ Masks:
  - "Gekko Saves Christmas" (Season 1, Episode 12A) (2015)
  - "The PJ Masks Save Christmas" (Season 3, Episode 21) (2019)
  - "The Christmas Ninjalinos" (Season 6, Episode 13) (2023)
- Puppy Dog Pals:
  - "A Very Pug Christmas/The Latke Kerfuffle" (Season 1, Episode 25) (2017)
  - "A Santa for Bob/Snowman Secret Service" (Season 2, Episode 12) (2018)
  - "Elves for a Day/The Dreidel Dilemma" (Season 3, Episode 5) (2019)
  - "A Christmas Mission in Toyland/Nine Lights Tonight" (Season 4, Episode 4) (2020)
  - "Wrap Party Pups/Fixing Santa's Sleigh" (Season 5, Episode 17) (2022)
- Pupstruction:
  - "Pupstruction Saves Christmas/Pupstruction on Ice" (Season 1, Episode 16) (2023)
  - "A Very Merry Christmas/Mountain Dogs" (Season 2, Episode 10) (2024)
  - "Sleighstruction Ho-Ho-Ho/The Great Gingerbread Build" (Season 3, Episode 24) (2026)
- RoboGobo:
  - "Risky & Royale's Christmas Wish/Pupsicle's Snow Globe" (Season 2, Episode 25) (2026)
- The Rocketeer (2019 TV series): "The Christmas Star" (Season 1, Episode 20) (2020)
- Rolie Polie Olie:
  - "Jingle, Jangle Day's Eve/Snowie/Starry Starry Night" (Season 2, Episode 11) (1999)
  - "A Jingle Jangle Wish" (Season 5, Episode 4C) (2001)
  - "A Little Jingle Jangle Sparkler/A Gift For Klanky Klaus/All's Squared Away Day" (Season 6, Episode 3) (2003)
- Sofia the First:
  - "Holiday in Enchancia" (Season 1, Episode 24) (2013)
  - "The Secret Library: Olaf and the Tale of Miss Nettle" (Season 3, Episode 13) (2016)
  - "The Mystic Isles: A Very Mystic Wassalia" (Season 4, Episode 16) (2017)
- Sofia the First: Royal Magic:
  - "Holiday at Charmswell" (Season 1, Episode 14) (2026)
- Special Agent Oso:
  - "The Living Holiday Lights" (Season 2, Episode 11) (2010)
- Spidey and His Amazing Friends:
  - "A Very Spidey Christmas" (Season 1, Episode 12) (2021)
  - "Merry Spidey Christmas" (Season 2, Episode 8) (2022)
  - "A Snow Day For Aunt May/Hanukkah Heist" (Season 3, Episode 26) (2024)
  - "The Candlelight Christmas Walk/The Santa Trap" (Season 4, Episode 15) (2025)
  - "A Very Symbie Christmas/Squirrel Girl's Arctic Adventure" (Season 5, Episode 11) (2026)
- Stanley: "Little Dog Lost" (Season 1, Episode 19) (2001)
- Star Wars: Young Jedi Adventures:
  - "Life Day" (Season 1, Episode 19A) (2023)
  - "The Missing Life Day Feast" (Season 2, Episode 9A) (2024)
- SuperKitties:
  - "Merry Mousemas" (Season 1, Episode 24) (2023)
  - "Runaway Sleigh/Hanukkah" (Season 2, Episode 14) (2024)
  - "Kittydale Christmas Tree/Skating Buddies" (Season 3, Episode 9) (2025)
- The Lion Guard: "Timon & Pumbaa's Christmas" (Season 2, Episode 12) (2017)
- Timmy Time: "Timmy's Christmas Surprise" (2011)
- T.O.T.S.: "Santa Baby" (Season 1, Episode 18A) (2019)
- Vampirina:
  - "Nanpire and Grandpop The Greats/There's Snow Place Like Home" (Season 1, Episode 25) (2018)
  - "A Gargoyle Carol" (Season 2, Episode 21) (2019)
  - "The Fright Before Christmas/Scared Snowman" (Season 3, Episode 17) (2020)
- The Wiggles/Dorothy the Dinosaur (Tv series):
  - Wiggly Wiggly Christmas (1997)
  - Yule Be Wiggling (2001)
  - Santa's Rockin'! (2004)
  - "Dorothy the Dinosaur Meets Santa Claus" (2009)
  - "Dorothy the Dinosaur's Rockin' Christmas" (2010)
  - "It's Always Christmas with You" (2011)
  - "Go Santa Go" (2013)
  - "Wiggly Wiggly Christmas" (2017)
  - "The Sound of Christmas" (2023)

==== Nickelodeon/Nicktoons/Nick Jr. Channel ====
- Aaahh!!! Real Monsters: "Gone Shopp'n" (Season 1, Episode 6B) (1994)
- Abby Hatcher: "A Very Fuzzly Christmas" (Season 2, Episode 17) (2020)
- The Adventures of Jimmy Neutron, Boy Genius: "Holly Jolly Jimmy" (Season 2, Episode 8) (2003)
- The Adventures of Paddington (2019 TV series):
  - "Paddington and the Lost Letter" (2020)
  - "Paddington Gets Locked Out on Christmas Day" (2021)
  - "Paddington's Special Visitor/Paddington Celebrates Hanukkah" (2023)
- Alvin and the Chipmunks: "A Very Merry Chipmunk" (Season 4, Episode 49) (2020)
- The Angry Beavers: "Gift Hoarse" (Season 1, Episode 3A) (1997)
- As Told By Ginger: "Hanukkah or Christmas" (Season 1, Episode 16) (2001)
- "Baby Shark's Big Fishmas Special" (2020)
- Back at the Barnyard: "It's an Udderful Life!" (Season 2, Episode 19) (2009)
- The Backyardigans: "The Action Elves Save Christmas Eve!" (Season 4, Episode 10) (2009)
- Blaze and the Monster Machines:
  - "Monster Machine Christmas" (Season 2, Episode 6) (2015)
  - "A Blazing Amazing Christmas" (Season 6, Episode 25) (2022)
  - "Get the Letters to Santa" (Season 8, Episode 12) (2024)
  - "Christmas Power! A Monster Machine Super Special" (Season 9, Episodes 14 & 15) (2025)
- Bossy Bear: "Candle with Care/Happy Froofenfroogle!/The Winter Gift Swap" (2023)
- Breadwinners: "A Crustmas Story" (Season 2, Episode 9) (2015)
- The Busy World of Richard Scarry: "Abe and Babe's Christmas Lesson/Sally Cat's Christmas Dream/The Best Christmas Present Ever" (Season 4, Episode 10)
- Butterbean's Cafe: "The Sugar Plum Fairy!" (Season 1, Episode 12) (2018)
- CatDog: "A Very CatDog Christmas" (Season 2, Episode 17) (1999)
- ChalkZone: "When Santas Collide" (Season 3, Episode 15) (2004)
- Danny Phantom: "The Fright Before Christmas!" (Season 2, Episode 10) (2005)
- Dora: "Dora Saves Christmas" (Season 3, Episode 19) (2025)
- Doug: "Doug's Christmas Story" (Season 4, Episode 10) (1993)
- Eureeka's Castle: "Christmas at Eureeka's Castle" (1990)
- Face's Music Party:
  - "Face's SuperSnowtacular Holiday Special" (2022)
  - "Face's Holiday Countdown Party" (2023)
- Fanboy & Chum Chum:
  - "Night Morning" (Season 1, Episode 11) (2009)
  - "A Very Brrr-y Icemas" (Season 2, Episode 16) (2011)
- The Fresh Beat Band: "Fresh Beats in Toyland" (Season 2, Episode 7) (2010)
- Fresh Beat Band of Spies: "Christmas 2.0" (Season 1, Episode 18) (2015)
- Go, Diego, Go!: "Diego Saves Christmas!" (Season 2, Episode 7) (2006)
- Harvey Beaks: "It's Christmas You Dorks!" (Season 2, Episode 11) (2016)
- Hey Arnold: "Arnold's Christmas" (Season 1, Episode 18) (1996)
- Invader Zim: "The Most Horrible X-Mas Ever" (Season 2, Episode 1) (2002)
- It's Pony: "Christmas with The Bramleys" (Season 1, Episode 16) (2020)
- Kappa Mikey: "A Christmas Mikey" (Season 1, Episode 19) (2006)
- Kung Fu Panda: Legends of Awesomeness: "Present Tense" (Season 2, Episode 10) (2012)
- Lego City Adventures:
  - "Police Navidad" (Season 1, Episode 17) (2019)
  - " Arrest Ye Merry Gentlemen" (Season 2, Episode 10A) (2020)
- Little Bear:
  - "The Snowball Fight/Winter Solstice/Snowbound" (Season 2, Episode 5) (1996)
  - "Gingerbread Cookies (Season 3, Episode 6A) (1997)
  - "Winter Wonderland" (Season 3, Episode 13B) (1998)
- Little Bill: "Merry Christmas, Little Bill!" (Season 2, Episode 22) (2001)
- Little Charmers: "Santa Sparkle" (Season 1, Episode 30) (2015)
- Maisy: "Snow/Cards/Christmas Tree/Christmas" (Season 1, Episode 17) (1999)
- My Life as a Teenage Robot: "A Robot for All Seasons" (Season 2, Episode 1) (2004)
- Nella the Princess Knight: "The Knight Before Christmas" (Season 1, Episode 23) (2017)
- NFL Rush Zone:
  - "Frost and Ten" (Season 2, Episode 5) (2012)
  - "Gone Viral" (Season 3, Episode 5) (2013)
- The Penguins of Madagascar: "The All Nighter Before Christmas" (Season 2, Episode 31) (2010)
- Pig Goat Banana Cricket: "Happy Chalawunga" (Season 1, Episode 15) (2015)
- Rainbow Butterfly Unicorn Kitty: "Merry Mythmas" (Season 1, Episode 26) (2019)
- Robot and Monster: "Baconmas" (Season 1, Episode 22) (2012)
- Rocket Power: "A Rocket Xmas" (Season 4, Episode 2) (2003)
- Rock Paper Scissors:
  - "The Holiday Picture" (Season 1, Episode 11A) (2024)
  - "The Origami Robot" (Season 2, Episode 5A) (2025)
- Rocko's Modern Life: "Rocko's Modern Christmas" (Season 2, Episode 6) (1994)
- Sanjay and Craig: "Huggle Day" (Season 3, Episode 5) (2015)
- Santiago of the Seas: A Pirate Christmas (2020)
- The Smurfs: "A Smurfy Christmas" (2023)
- Sunny Day: "Sleepover Surprise" (Season 1, Episode 23) (2018)
- Super Duper Bunny League: "The Bunnies Save Christmas!" (Season 2, Episode 8) (2025)
- Team Umizoomi: "Santa's Little Fixers" (Season 1, Episode 20) (2010)
- Tim Rex in Space: "Rumblefest Eve/Rumblefest" (Season 2, Episodes 5A & 5B) (2025)
- The Tiny Chef Show: "Tiny Chef's Marvelous Mish Mash Special" (2023)
- The Wild Thornberrys: "Have Yourself a Thornberry Little Christmas" (Season 2, Episode 21) (1999)
- T.U.F.F. Puppy: A Doomed Christmas (Season 1, Episode 20) (2011)
- Wayside:
  - "Christmas" (Season 2, Episode 6B) (2007)
- Wallykazam!:
  - "Wally Saves the Trollidays" (Season 1, Episode 21) (2014)
- Wild Grinders:
  - "Grinder Claus/Merry Grindernukamas" (Season 1, Episode 24) (2012)
  - "Grindy the Snowman" (Season 2, Episode 23) (2014)
- Winx Club: "A Magix Christmas" (Season 5, Episode 10) (2012)
- Wylde Pak: "Where There's a Will, There's a Way" (Season 1, Episode 11A) (2025)

===== Bubble Guppies =====
- "Happy Holidays, Mr. Grumpfish!" (Season 2, Episode 2) (2011)
- "A Very Guppy Christmas" (Season 3, Episode 20) (2014)
- "The Guppies Save Christmas!" (Season 5, Episode 14) (2020)
- "Christmas is Coming!" (Season 6, Episode 3) (2021)

===== Dora the Explorer =====
- "A Present For Santa" (Season 2, Episode 15) (2002)
- "Dora's Christmas Carol Adventure" (Season 5, Episode 14) (2009)

===== The Fairly OddParents =====
- "Christmas Every Day" (Season 1, Episode 7) (2001)
- "Merry Wishmas" (Season 6, Episode 12) (2008)

===== Franklin =====
- "Franklin's School Play" (Season 1, Episode 9A) (1997)
- "Franklin's Christmas Gift" (Season 1, Episode 12A) (1998)
- Franklin's Magic Christmas (2001)
- Franklin and Friends:
  - "Franklin's Christmas Spirit" (Season 1, Episode 25) (2014)

===== Max & Ruby =====
- "Max's Christmas/Ruby's Snow Queen/Max's Rocket Run" (Season 1, Episode 10) (2002)
- "Grandma's Present/Max and Ruby's Christmas Tree/Max's Snowplow" (Season 3, Episode 13) (2007)
- "Ruby's Gingerbread House/Max's Christmas Passed/Max's New Year" (Season 4, Episode 8) (2009)
- "Ruby's Perfect Christmas Tree/Max's Christmas Present/Max and Ruby's Christmas Carol" (Season 5, Episode 1) (2011)
- "Max Decorates" (Season 6, Episode 16A) (2017)
- "Let it Snow" (Season 7, Episode 10B) (2018)

===== Middlemost Post =====
- "Parker Saves Christmas" (Season 1, Episode 10) (2021)
- "Summer Santa" (Season 2, Episode 10) (2022)

===== Paw Patrol =====
- "Pups Save Christmas" (Season 1, Episode 11) (2013)
- "Pups Save a Bah Humdinger" (Season 7, Episode 16) (2020)
- "Charger's Christmas Adventure/Pups Save Great Uncle Smiley's Cup" (Season 10, Episode 14) (2023)
- "A Jr. Patrollers' Christmas" (Season 11, Episode 14) (2024)
- Shorts
  - "Dino Rescue: Pups Save a Dino Christmas" (Season 1, Episode 9) (2020)
- A Paw Patrol Christmas (2025)
- Rubble & Crew
  - "The Crew Builds a Christmas Show/The Crew Builds a Sled Ramp" (Season 1, Episode 24) (2023)
  - "The Crew Makes Christmas Magical" (Season 2, Episode 19) (2024)
  - "The Crew Builds a Santa's Village/The Crew Builds a Giant Dreidel" (Season 4, Episode TBA) (2025)

===== The Ren & Stimpy Show =====
- Son of Stimpy (Season 2, Episode 7) (1993)
- A Scooter for Yaksmas (Season 5, Episode 9) (1995)

===== Rugrats =====
- "The Santa Experience" (Season 2, Episode 14) (1992)
- "The Blizzard" (Season 3, Episode 12B) (1993)
- "A Rugrats Chanukah" (Season 4, Episode 1) (1996)
- "Let it Snow" (Season 4, Episode 14B) (1997)
- "A Rugrats Kwanzaa" (Season 7, Episode 13) (2001)
- "Babies in Toyland" (Season 9, Episode 3-4) (2002)
- All Grown Up!:
  - "The Finster Who Stole Christmas" (Season 4, Episode 1) (2004)
- Rugrats (2021 TV series):
  - "Traditions" (Season 1, Episode 14) (2021)

===== SpongeBob SquarePants =====
- "Christmas Who?" (Season 2, Episode 8) (2000)
- "It's a SpongeBob Christmas!" (Season 8, Episode 23) (2012)
- "Goons on the Moon" (Season 11, Episode 26) (2018)
- "Plankton's Old Chum" (Season 12, Episode 11a) (2019)
- "SpongeBob's Road to Christmas" (Season 13, Episode 5) (2021)
- "Sandy's Country Christmas" (Season 14, Episode 13) (2024)
- "Merry Christmas, Mr. Plankton" (Season 18) (2026)
- Kamp Koral: SpongeBob's Under Years:
  - "The Ho! Ho! Horror!" (Season 1, Episode 12a) (2021)
- The Patrick Star Show:
  - "Just in Time for Christmas" (Season 1, Episode 8a) (2021)
  - "Squidina's Holidaze Special" (Season 3, Episode 15) (2024)

===== The Loud House / The Casagrandes =====
- "11 Louds a Leapin'" (Season 2, Episode 1) (2016)
- "Snow Way Out/Snow Way Down (Season 2, Episode 26) (2017)
- "Season's Cheating/A Flipmas Carol" (Season 5, Episode 8A) (2020)
- "Snow Escape/Snow News Day" (Season 6, Episode 23) (2022)
- "Twas the Fight Before Christmas" (Season 7, Episode 19) (2023)
- "A Loud House Christmas Movie: Naughty or Nice" (2025)
- "Merry Diss-mass/Just Snow with It" (Season 9, Episode 2) (2025)
- The Casagrandes:
  - "A Very Casagrandes Christmas" (Season 2, Episode 2) (2020)

===== Wow! Wow! Wubbzy! =====
- "O' Figgity Fig Tree/Snow Day" (Season 1, Episode 22) (2007)
- "Great and Grumpy Holiday/The Super Special Gift" (Season 2, Episode 10) (2008)

=== Weekday and Saturday morning cartoons ===
- Robotech:
  - "Season's Greetings" (Season 1, Episode 35) (1985)
- Heathcliff:
  - "Christmas Memories" (Season 2, Episode 9b) (1985)
  - "North Pole Cat" (Season 2, Episode 21a) (1985)
- G.I. Joe: A Real American Hero: "COBRA Claws Are Coming to Town" (Season 3, Episode 39) (1985)
- Rambo: The Force of Freedom – "When S.A.V.A.G.E. Stole Santa" (Season 1, Episode 45) (November 14, 1986)
- Saber Rider and the Star Sheriffs: "The Monarch Supreme" (Season 1, Episode 24) (1987)
- BraveStarr: "Tex's Terrible Night" (Season 1, Episode 46) (1987)
- Dinosaucers: "There's No Such Thing as Stego-Claws" (Season 1, Episode 47) (1987)
- Hello Kitty's Furry Tale Theater: "The Year Scroogenip Swiped Christmas" (Season 1, Episode 12) (1987)
- The Adventures of Teddy Ruxpin: "Winter Adventures" (Season 2, Episode 55) (1987)
- Beverly Hills Teens – "Miracle at the Teen Club" (Season 1, Episodes 64 & 65) (December 17–18, 1987)
- Police Academy: "Santa With a Badge" (Season 2, Episode 10) (1988)
- Garbage Pail Kids – "Chris Messin' August" (Season 1, Episode 8) (June 30, 1988)
- Denver, the Last Dinosaur: "There's No Business Like Snow Business" (Season 1, Episode 28) (1989)

- Count Duckula: "A Christmas Quacker" (Season 3, Episode 10) (1990)
- Rupert:
  - "Rupert and Billy Blizzard" (Season 1, Episode 12) (1991)
  - "Rupert and the Missing Snow" (Season 2, Episode 2) (1992)
  - "Rupert's Christmas Adventure" (Season 4, Episode 13) (1995)
- The Adventures of Don Coyote and Sancho Panda – "Don Coyote & the Christmas Bell" (Season 2, Episode 12) (December 1, 1991)
- The Pink Panther: "I'm Dreaming of a Pink Christmas" (Season 1, Episode 35b) (1993)
- Samurai Pizza Cats: "The Cheese who Stole Christmas" (Season 1, Episode 47) (1993)
- Biker Mice from Mars: "Chill Zone" (Season 1, Episode 12) (1994)
- Littlest Pet Shop:
  - "Do Not Solve Until Christmas" (Season 1, Episode 15a) (1995)
  - "Who Scrooged McRude?" (Season 1, Episode 39a) (1995)
- Mutant League – "Strike" (Season 2, Episode 18) (December 23, 1995)
- Free Willy – "Yule Tide and Red Tide" (Season 2, Episode 8) (February 25, 1995)
- Extreme Dinosaurs: "Holiday on Ice" (Season 1, Episode 52) (1997)
- Flying Rhino Junior High: "Phantom Christmas" (Season 1, Episode 11) (1998)
- RoboCop: Alpha Commando:
  - "Oh Tannenbaum, Whoa Tannenbaum!" (Season 1, Episode 18) (1998)
- Gadget Boy & Heather: "A Gadget Boy Christmas Around the World" (Season 2, Episode 25) (1998)
- Tatu:
  - "Imperfect Girl" (2000)
- Gadget & the Gadgetinis: "Santa Claw" (Season 1, Episode 35) (2003)
- Pucca:
  - "'Tis the Season for REVENGE!/Northern Lights Out/Secret Santa" (Season 1, Episode 10) (2006)
- Thugaboo: Christmas Special (2006)
- Kate & Mim-Mim:
  - "A Christmas Wish" (Season 1, Episode 26) (2014)

==== ABC ====
- Popeye the Sailor: "Spinach Greetings" (Season 2) (1960)
- Pac-Man: "Christmas Comes to Pac-Land" (1982)
- The Real Ghostbusters: "X-Mas Marks the Spot" (Season 1, Episode 13) (1986)
- Bump in the Night: "'Twas the Night Before Bumpy" (1995)
- Baby Huey: "Jumping with Toy" (1957)
- Dumb and Dumber: "Santa Klutz" (Season 1, Episode 8a) (1995)
- Sabrina: The Animated Series: "Witchmas Carole" (Season 1, Episode 58) (1999)
- The Gumby Show:
  - "Santa-Witch"/"Scrooge Loose"/"Pigeon in a Plum Tree" (1960)
  - "Humbug" (1988)

==== CBS ====
- The Alvin Show: The Chipmunk Song ("Christmas Don't Be Late") (Season 1, Episode 10) (1961)
- Beetle Bailey: "A Christmas Tale" (1963)
- Tennessee Tuxedo and His Tales: "Tree Trimmers" (Season 3, Episode 9) (1965)
- Famous Classic Tales: "A Christmas Carol" (Season 1, Episode 3) (1970)
- The Fat Albert "Christmas Special" (1977)
- The Little King: "Christmas Night" (1933)
- The Tom and Jerry Comedy Show: "Snowbrawl" (Season 1, Episode 22) (1980)
- Saturday Supercade: Donkey Kong Jr.: "A Christmas Story" (Season 1, Episode 10) (1983)
- A Garfield Christmas Special (1987)
- The Adventures of Raggedy Ann and Andy: "The Christmas Adventure" (Season 1, Episode 9) (1988)
- Garfield and Friends: "Heatwave Holiday" (Season 2, Episode 4C) (1989)
- Ace Ventura: Pet Detective: "The Reindeer Hunter" (Season 1, Episode 1) (1995)
- The Mask: "Santa Mask" (Season 1, Episode 14) (1995)
- Herman and Katnip: "Mice Meeting You" (1950)

==== Fox Kids ====
- Peter Pan and the Pirates: "Hook's Christmas" (Season 1, Episode 37) (1991)
- Super Dave: Daredevil for Hire: "Merry Christmas, Super Dave!" (Season 1, Episode 12) (1992)
- Eek! The Cat:
  - "It's a Wonderful Nine Lives" (Season 1, Episode 12) (1992)
  - "It's a Very Merry Eek's-Mas" (Season 2, Episode 9) (1993)
- Life with Louie:
  - "A Christmas Surprise for Mrs. Stillman" (Season 1, Episode 1) (1994)
  - "Family Portrait" (Season 3, Episode 10) (1997)
- Bobby's World: "Miracle on 34th Street & Rural Route 1" (Season 6, Episode 5) (1995)
- The Tick: "The Tick Loves Santa!" (Season 2, Episode 10) (1995)
- Where on Earth Is Carmen Sandiego?: "Just Like Old Times" (Season 3, Episode 10) (1995)
- X-Men: "Have Yourself a Morlock Little X-Mas" (Season 4, Episode 17) (1995)
- The Spooktacular New Adventures of Casper: "A Christmas Peril/Ms. Banshee's Holiday Hits/Good Morning, Dr. Harvey/Fright Before Christmas (Season 2, Episode 13) (1996)
- The Adventures of Sam & Max: Freelance Police: "Christmas Bloody Christmas" (Season 1, Episode 7a) (1997)
- The New Woody Woodpecker Show:
  - "A Very Woody Christmas/It's A Chilly Christmas After All/Yule Get Yours" (Season 1, Episode 23) (1999)
  - "The Twelve Lies of Christmas" (Season 2, Episode 17) (2000)
- Teenage Mutant Ninja Turtles: "The Christmas Aliens" (a. k. a. "Michelangelo's Christmas Rescue) (Season 3, Episode 12) (2004)

==== NBC ====
- The Bullwinkle Show: "Topsy Turvy World" (Season 3, Episode 27-33) (1962)
- The Space Kidettes: "The Flight Before Christmas" (Season 1, Episode 11) (1966)
- The Berenstain Bears' Christmas Tree (1979)
- The Little Rascals: The Little Rascals Christmas Special (1979)
- Alvin and the Chipmunks:
  - "A Chipmunk Christmas" (1981)
  - "Swiss Family Chipmunks/Santa Harry" (Season 1, Episode 11) (1983)
  - "Merry Christmas, Mr. Carroll" (Season 7, Episode 13) (1989)
- Pink Panther and Sons: "Insanity Claus" (Season 1, Episode 8b) (1984)
- It's Punky Brewster: "Christmas In July" (Season 1, Episode 5b) (1985)
- Camp Candy: "Christmas in July" (Season 1, Episode 13) (1990)
- Inspector Gadget: Inspector Gadget Saves Christmas (1992)

==== PBS Kids ====
- Adventures from the Book of Virtues: "A Christmas Carol" (2000) (2-part final episode)
- Alma's Way: "Alma's Noche Buena/Three Kings Day Do-Over" (Season 1, Episode 14) (2021)
- Arthur: Arthur's Perfect Christmas (2000)
- Angelina Ballerina:
  - "The Gift" (Season 1, Episode 2A) (2002)
  - "Christmas in Mouseland" (2002)
- Angelina Ballerina: The Next Steps: "Angelina's Holiday Treats" (Season 2, Episode 2A) (2009)
- Barney and the Backyard Gang: Waiting for Santa (1990)
- Barney & Friends:
  - "Barney's Night Before Christmas" (1999)
  - "Barney's Christmas Star" (2002)
  - "Gift of the Dinos/A Visit to Santa" (Season 11, Episode 19) (2007)
  - "A Very Merry Christmas" (2011)
- Boohbah:
  - "Glowing Lanterns" (2005)
- Caillou
  - "Caillou's Holiday Movie" (2003)
  - "Caillou's Christmas" (Season 4, Episode 17) (2007)
- The Cat in the Hat Knows a Lot About Christmas! (2012)
- Clifford's Puppy Days
  - "The Big, Big Present/Hanukah Plunder Blunder" (Season 2, Episode 7) (2005)
  - "Heroes and Friends/The Cookie Crumbles" (Season 2 Episode 12) (2006)
- Curious George: A Very Monkey Christmas (2009)
- Cyberchase:
  - "Starlight Night" (Season 3, episode 12) (2004)
  - "When Penguins Fly" (Season 6, episode 2) (2007)
  - "A Reboot Eve to Remember" (Season 11, episode 5) (2017)
- Daniel Tiger's Neighborhood:
  - "Snowflake Day!" (Season 1, Episode 33) (2013)
  - "Daniel's Winter Adventure/Neighborhood Nutcracker" (Season 2, Episode 7) (2014)
- Dinosaur Train:
  - "Dinosaurs in the Snow/Cretaceous Conifers" (Season 1, Episode 17) (2009)
  - "Don's Winter Wish/Festival of Lights" (Season 2, Episode 12) (2012)
- Elinor Wonders Why:
  - "The Science of Staying Warm" (Season 1, Episode 4A) (2020)
  - "Snow Friend" (Season 1, Episode 11B) (2020)
- Jay Jay the Jet Plane: "Jay Jay's Christmas Adventure" (Season 1, Episode 35-36) (1998)
- Let's Go Luna!: "Luna's Christmas Around the World!" (2018)
- Liberty's Kids: "Across the Delaware" (Season 1, Episode 19) (2002)
- Lyla in the Loop: "Uh-Oh!" (Season 1, Episode 20A) (2024)
- Martha Speaks: "Martha's Holiday Surprise" (Season 6, Episode 8) (2014)
- Maya & Miguel: "Miguel's Wonderful Life" (Season 4, Episode 3) (2005)
- Molly of Denali: "Tooey's Hole-liday Sweater" (Season 1, Episode 32B) (2020)
- Nature Cat: "A Nature Carol" (2019)
- Odd Squad: Reindeer Games" (Season 1, Episode 5) (2014)
- Peg + Cat:
  - "The Hanukkah Problem" (Season 1, Episode 28B)
  - "The Christmas Problem" (Season 1, Episode 29) (2014)
- Pinkalicious & Peterrific: "Gingerbread House/Christmas Tree Trouble" (Season 2, Episode 13) (2020)
- Ready Jet Go!: "Holidays in Boxwood Terrace" (Season 1, Episode 38) (2017)
- Rosie's Rules: "Rosie's Christmas in Mexico" (Season 1, Episode 36) (2023)
- Sid the Science Kid: "Sid's Holiday Adventure" (Season 1, Episode 38) (2009)
- Sesame Street:
  - "Christmas Eve on Sesame Street" (1978)
  - "Elmo Saves Christmas" (1996)
  - "Elmo's World: Happy Holidays!" (2002)
  - A Sesame Street Christmas Carol (2006)
  - "Elmo's Christmas Countdown" (2007)
  - "Once Upon a Sesame Street Christmas" (2016)
  - "Holiday at Hooper's" (Season 51, Episode 6) (2020)
- Splash and Bubbles: "Whitebeard/Coral Day" (Season 1, Episode 31) (2017)
- Super Why!:
  - "Twas the Night Before Christmas" (Season 1, Episode 38) (2008)
  - "The Nutcracker" (Season 1, Episode 56) (2009)
  - "Judith's Happy Chanukah" (Season 3, Episode 10) (2015)
- Teletubbies:
  - "Christmas Tree" (Season 1, Episode 111)(1997)
  - "Making Christmas Cards" (Season 1, Episode 112) (1997)
  - "Crackers" (Season 1, Episode 113) (1997)
  - "Christmas Carols" (Season 1, Episode 114) (1997)
  - "Snowy Story" (Season 1, Episode 115) (1997)
  - "Christmas in South Africa" (Season 2, Episode 118) (1998)
  - "Christmas in Finland" (Season 2, Episode 119) (1998)
  - "Christmas in UK" (Season 2, Episode 120) (1998)
  - "Christmas in Spain" (Season 2, Episode 121) (1998)
  - "Nativity Play" (Season 2, Episode 122) (1998)
  - "The Christmas Special" (2018)
  - "Getting Ready for Christmas" (2022)
  - "Santa Po" (2022)
  - "Christmas Crackers" (2022)
  - "It's Christmas with Santa Po" (2022)
  - "Christmas Sing Along" (2022)
- The Magic School Bus: "Holiday Special" (Season 3, Episode 13) (1996)
- Weather Hunters:
  - "Weather Hunters On Ice" (Season 1, Episode 22) (2026)
  - "Winter Wonderland" (Season 1, Episode 23) (2026)
  - "The Hunter Family Trees" (Season 1, Episode 24) (2026)
- Wild Kratts: "A Creature Christmas" (2015)
- WordGirl: "Oh Holiday Cheese" (Season 2, Episode 19) (2009)
- WordWorld: "The Christmas Star/A Christmas Present For Dog" (Season 1, Episode 26) (2008)
- Work It Out Wombats!:
  - "The Treeborhood Parranda/Happy New Acorn Year" (Season 1, Episode 24) (2023)
  - "Hanukkah and the Snowy Day/The Fisherman's Menorah" (Season 2, Episode 54) (2026)

=== Showtime ===
- A Bunch of Munsch: "Thomas' Snowsuit/50 Below Zero" (Episode 1) (1991)

=== Starz ===
- Eloise: The Animated Series: "Little Miss Christmas" (3-part episode) (2006)

=== Universal Animation Studios ===
- Woody Woodpecker: "Christmess Eve" (Season 1, Episode 6) (2018)

==== Universal Kids/Sprout ====
- "A Sesame Street Christmas Carol" (2006)
- Dot.:
  - "A Song for Everyone" (Season 1, Episode 13) (2016)
  - "The Holiday Tree" (Season 1, Episode 14) (2016)
- Justin Time:
  - "Yodel Odel Day" (Season 1, Episode 2A) (2011)
  - "Babushka's Bear" (Season 3, Episode 8) (2016)
- Nina's World:
  - "Nina's Very Merry Gift" (Season 1, Episode 31) (2016)
  - "Letter to Santa" (2017)
- Where's Waldo:
  - "A Wanderer's Christmas" (Season 1, Episode 20) (2019)
- Astroblast!:
  - "Comet's Gift" (Season 1, Episode 25) (2014)

==== Hanna-Barbera / Warner Bros. Animation / Kids' WB ====
- Batman: The Animated Series: Christmas with the Joker (1992)
- Batman: The Brave and the Bold: "Invasion of the Secret Santas!" (Season 1, Episode 4) (2008)
- Dorothy and the Wizard of Oz: "Dorothy's Christmas in Oz" (2018)
- Earthworm Jim: "For Whom The Jingle Bells Tolls" (Season 2, Episode 10) (1996)
- Freakazoid: "The Chip (Part 1) (Season 1, Episode 6)/"The Chip (Part 2) (Season 1, Episode 7A)/"In Arms Way" (Season 1, Episode 10A) (1995)
- Histeria
  - "The American Revolution (Part 1) (Season 1, Episode 5) (1998)
- Jackie Chan Adventures: "A Jolly J-Team Xmas" (Season 3 Episode 10) (2002)
- Jellystone!:
  - "Jailcation" (Season 1, Episode 36) (2022)
  - "Snowdodio" (Season 3, Episode 10) (2025)
- The Jetsons: "A Jetson Christmas Carol" (Season 2, Episode 36) (1985)
- Justice League: "Comfort And Joy" (Season 2, Episode 23) (2003)
- Krypto the Superdog: "Storybook Holiday" (Season 1, Episode 26) (2005)
- MAD:
  - "Da Grinchy Code/Duck" (Season 1, Episode 12) (2010)
  - "FROST/Undercover Claus" (Season 2, Episode 15) (2011)
  - "Fantastic Four Christmases/Red & White Collar" (Season 3, Episode 20) (2012)
- Men in Black: The Series: "The Black Christmas Syndrome" (Season 2, Episode 10) (1998)
- ¡Mucha Lucha!: "The Match Before Xmas" (Season 3, Episode 9) (2004)
- Paddington Bear: "The Ghost of Christmas Paddington" (Season 1, Episode 7) (1989)
- Static Shock: "Frozen Out" (Season 2, Episode 5) (2002)
- The New Batman Adventures: "Holiday Knights" (Season 1, Episode 1) (1997)
- ThunderCats Roar: "Mandora Saves Christmas" (Season 1, Episode 52) (2020)
- The Spectacular Spider-Man: "Reinforcement" (Season 2, Episode 3) (2009)
- Tom and Jerry:
  - "The Night Before Christmas" (1941)
  - "Mice Follies" (1954)
  - "The A-Tom-inable Snowman" (1966)
- The Tom and Jerry Show:
  - "The Plight Before Christmas" (Season 1, Episode 28) (2014)
  - "Dragon Down the Holidays" (Season 2, Episode 15) (2017)
- Tom and Jerry Tales: "Ho Ho Horrors" (Season 1, Episode 22) (2007)
- Top Cat: "The Long, Hot Winter" (Season 1, Episode 15) (1962)
- Unikitty!:
  - "No Day Like Snow Day" (Season 1, Episode 3) (2017)
  - "Top of the Naughty List" (Season 1, Episode 39) (2018)
- Wacky Races:
  - "It's a Wacky Life" (Season 1, Episode 18) (2017)
  - "Dashing Thru the Snow" (Season 1, Episode 20) (2017)
  - "Signed, Sealed, and Wacky" (Season 2, Episode 24) (2018)
- X-Men: Evolution: "On Angel's Wings" (Season 2, Episode 9) (2001)

===== Animaniacs =====
- Animaniacs
  - "Twas The Day Before Christmas/Jingle Boo/The Great Wakkorotti: The Holiday Concert/A Christmas Plotz/Little Drummer Warners" (Season 1, Episodes 49 & 50) (1993)
  - "The Twelve Days of Christmas" (Season 3, Episode 10D) (1996)
  - "Noel" (Season 4, Episode 2C) (1996)
  - "The Christmas Tree" (Season 5, Episode 8A) (1997)
- Pinky and the Brain: "A Pinky and the Brain Christmas" (Season 1, Episode 8) (1995)
- Pinky, Elmyra and the Brain: "Yule Be Sorry" (Season 1, Episode 7A) (1998)
- Animaniacs (2020): "How the Brain Thieved Christmas, Part 1 & 2/Santamaniacs" (Season 3, Episode 9) (2023/Hulu)

===== The Flintstones =====
- "Christmas Flintstone" (Season 5, Episode 15) (December 25, 1964) (ABC)
- A Flintstone Christmas (1977/NBC)
- A Flintstone Family Christmas (1993/ABC)
- A Flintstones Christmas Carol (1994/ABC)

==== Looney Tunes ====
- Looney Tunes:
  - "Gift Wrapped" (1952)
  - "Bugs Bunny's Looney Christmas Tales" (1979/CBS)
- Tiny Toon Adventures: "It's A Wonderful Tiny Toons Christmas Special" (Season 3, Episode 20) (1992/Fox Kids)
- Taz-Mania: "No Time For Christmas" (Season 3, Episode 13) (1993/Fox Kids)
- The Sylvester & Tweety Mysteries:
  - "It Happened One Night Before Christmas" (Season 1, Episode 10) (1995/Kids' WB)
  - "Feather Christmas/A Fist Full of Lutefisk" (Season 4, Episode 41) (1998/Kids' WB)
- Baby Looney Tunes: "Christmas In July" (Season 1, Episode 12b) (2002)
- The Looney Tunes Show: "A Christmas Carol" (Season 2, Episode 10) (2012/Cartoon Network)
- New Looney Tunes:
  - "Tis the Seasoning/Winter Blunderland" (Season 1, Episode 44) (2017)
  - "North Pole Position" (Season 3, Episode 4a) (2019)
  - "The Pepe Who Came in From the Cold" (Season 3, Episode 27a) (2020)
  - "The Legend of Burrito Monday" (Season 3, Episode 52) (2020)
- Looney Tunes Cartoons:
  - "Bugs Bunny's 24-Carrot Holiday Special" (Season 1, Episode 11) (2020)
  - "Winter Hungerland" (Season 6, Episode 4c) (2023)
- Bugs Bunny Builders:
  - "Looneyburg Lights" (Season 1, Episode 19/20) (2022)
  - "Santa's Toyshop" (Season 2, Episode 40) (2025)
- Tiny Toons Looniversity: "Winter Blunderland" (Season 2, Episodes 13 & 14) (2025)

===== Scooby-Doo =====
- The New Scooby-Doo Mysteries: "The Nutcracker Scoob" (Season 1, Episode 13) (1984)
- What's New, Scooby-Doo?: A Scooby-Doo Christmas" (Season 1, Episode 10) (2002)
- Scooby-Doo! Haunted Holidays (2012)
- Be Cool, Scooby-Doo!
  - "Scary Christmas" (Season 1, Episode 14) (2015)
  - "Scroogey Doo" (Season 2, Episode 10) (2017)

===== The Smurfs =====
- "The Baby's First Christmas" (Season 3, Episode 42) (1983)
- The Magic Sack of Mr. Nicholas" (Season 7, Episode 25a) (1987)
- "'Tis The Season to Be Smurfy" (1987)

==== Other Animations ====
===== Adventures in Odyssey =====
- "Electric Christmas" (1994)

===== Angry Birds =====
Angry birds classic & series

- Angry Birds Toons
  - "Jingle Yells" (Season 1, Episode 40) (2013)
  - "Joy to the Pigs" (Season 2, Episode 10) (2014)
  - "Last Tree Standing" (Season 3, Episode 11) (2015)
- Piggy Tales
  - "Snowed Up" (Season 1, Episode 28) (2014)
  - "Light Dance" (Season 3, Episode 24) (2016)
  - "Pig Expectations" (Season 3, Episode 25) (2016)
  - "Gift Wrapped" (Season 3, Episode 26) (2016)
  - "Holiday Song" (Season 3, Episode 27) (2016)
  - "Holiday Heist" (Season 4, Episode 2) (2017)
  - "Joyful Jingle" (Season 4, Episode 16) (2017)
  - "Happy New Pig" (Season 4, Episode 24) (2017)
- Angry Birds: Bubble Trouble
  - "Santa's Slip-Up" (Season 2, Episode 1) (2022)

===== BOZ the Bear =====
- "A WowieBOZowee Christmas" (2007)

===== GoGoRiki =====
  - "Snow Daze" (Season 1, Episode 12a) (2008)
  - "Operation Santa Claus" (Season 1, Episode 12b) (2008)
  - "Happy New Year" (Season 1, Episode 12c) (2008)

===== Hermie and Friends =====
- "A Fruitcake Christmas" (2005)

===== LeapFrog =====
- "A Tad of Christmas Cheer" (2007)

===== Anime =====
- Astro Boy: "The Light Ray Robot" (Season 1, Episode 13)
- Bobobo-bo Bo-bobo: "Let's Get Wiggy With It" (Season 1, Episode 2) (2005)
- Cyborg 009: "Christmas Eve Mirage" (Season 1, Episode 11)
- Digimon: Digital Monsters "A Very Digi Christmas (Season 2, Episode 38) (2001)
- Dinosaur King: "Santa Saurus!" (Season 1, Episode 45) (2007)
- Flint the Time Detective: "Cavemen's Christmas" (Season 1, Episode 13)
- Hamtaro:
  - "Merry Christmas!" (Season 1, Episode 25) (2000)
  - "It's Santa, Merry Christmas" (Season 9 Episode 26) (2004)
  - "A Christmas Ride!" (Season 11, Episode 26) (2005)
- Love Hina
  - "Love Hina Christmas Special - Silent Eve" (2000)
- Ranma ½: "Tendo Family Christmas Scramble"(1993)
- Sgt. Frog: The Space Frog Who Stole Christmas!"(Season 1, Episode 39)
- Yo-Kai Watch:
  - "A Very Christmas/The Koma-Santa Clause/Yo-Kai Ol' Saint Trick" (Season 2, Episode 24) (2016)
  - "Christmas Blackout!; Time for a Yo-kai Watch Upgrade" (Season 3, Episode 18) (2018)

===== Nintendo =====
- Donkey Kong Country: The Kongo Bongo Festival of Lights (1999)
- The Super Mario Bros. Super Show!: Koopa Klaus (1989)
- The Super Mario Bros. Super Show!: Santa Claus is Coming to Flatbush (1989)
- Super Mario World: The Night Before Cave Christmas (1991)

====== Pokémon ======
- "Holiday Hi-Jynx" (Season 2, Episode 65) (1998)
- "Pikachu's Winter Vacations: Christmas Night" (1999)
- "Pikachu's Winter Vacations: Stantler's Little Helpers" (2000)
- "Pikachu's Winter Vacations: Delibird's Dilemma" (2001)
- "Pikachu's Winter Vacations: Snorlax Snowman" (2001)

===== Adventures of Sonic the Hedgehog =====
- Sonic Christmas Blast (1996)

==== Disney Sing-Along Songs ====
- Very Merry Christmas Songs (1988/2002)
- The 12 Days of Christmas (1993)

=== Pippi Longstocking ===
- "Pippi's Christmas" (Season 1, Episode 14) (1998)

=== VeggieTales ===
- "The Toy That Saved Christmas" (1996)
- "The Star of Christmas" (2002)
- "Saint Nicholas: A Story of Joyful Giving" (2009)
- "It's a Meaningful Life" (2010)
- "The Little Drummer Boy (2011)
- Merry Larry and the True Light of Christmas" (2013)

=== VeggieTales in the City ===
- "An Ichabeezer Christmas/A Christmas Play" (Season 2, Episode 6) (2017)

=== The VeggieTales Show ===
- "The Best Christmas Gift" (Season 1, Episode 1) (2019)

=== Netflix ===
- Action Pack:
  - "The Action Pack Saves Christmas" (2022)
- Angry Birds: Summer Madness:
  - "Pigmas" (Season 3, Episode 4) (2022)
- A StoryBots Christmas (2017)
- The Bad Guys: A Very Bad Holiday (2023)
- Beat Bugs:
  - "Christmas Time Is Here Again" (Season 2, Episode 5) (2016)
- The Boss Baby: Christmas Bonus (2022)
- Chico Bon Bon: Monkey with a Tool Belt:
  - "Chico Bon Bon and the Very Berry Holiday" (2020)
- The Creature Cases:
  - "The Missing Mammoth: A Holiday Mystery" (2022)
- Cupcake & Dino: General Services:
  - "Christmas is Cancelled/Ice Station Dino" (Season 1, Episode 13) (2018)
- The Cuphead Show!:
  - "Holiday Tree-dition" (Season 3, Episode 5) (2022)
  - "A Very Devil Christmas" (Season 3, Episode 6) (2022)
- Dead End: Paranormal Park:
  - "The Nightmare Before Christmas in July (Season 1, Episode 5) (2022)
- DreamWorks Dragons: Rescue Riders:
  - "Huttsgalor Holiday" (2020)
- The Epic Tales of Captain Underpants:
  - "Mega Blissmas" (2020)
- Gabby's Dollhouse:
  - "A CAT-Tabulous Christmas" (Season 6, Episode 1) (2022)
  - "Mermaid Christmas Cruise" (Season 8, Episode 7) (2023)
- Go, Dog. Go!:
  - "Snow Dog, Snow" (Season 2, Episode 1) (2021)
- Go! Go! Cory Carson:
  - "A Go! Go! Cory Carson Christmas" (2020)
- Harvey Girls Forever!:
  - "Miracle on Harvey Street/I Know What You Did Last Stu-mmer" (Season 4, Episode 2) (2020)
- Hilda:
  - "Chapter 10: The Yule Lads" (Season 2, Episode 10) (2020)
- Home
  - "Home for the Holidays" (2017)
- Inspector Gadget (2015):
  - "The Claw Who Stole Christmas/The Thingy" (Season 2, Episode 15) (2018)
- Johnny Test:
  - "Johnny's Holiday Light Fight" (Season 1, Episode 20) (2021)
- Llama Llama:
  - "Snow Show/Secret Santa" (Season 1, Episode 6) (2018)
- Mighty Express:
  - "A Mighty Christmas" (2020)
- Miraculous Ladybug:
  - "A Special Christmas/Santa Claws (Season 2, Episode 1) (2016)
  - "Christmaster" (Season 3, Episode 24) (2019)
- The Mr. Peabody & Sherman Show:
  - "Charles Dickens" (Season 2, Episode 10B) (2016)
  - "Robert Edwin Peary" (Season 3, Episode 10B) (2016)
- My Little Pony: Make Your Mark:
  - "Winter Wishday" (Season 1, Episode 10) (2022)
- Octonauts:
  - "Octonauts and the Great Christmas Rescue" (2011)
  - "Octonauts and a Very Vegimal Christmas" (2013)
- Oggy Oggy:
  - "The Most Wonderful Time of the Year/White Christmas/The Mysterious Gift" (Season 3, Episode 23) (2023)
- Spirit Riding Free:
  - "Lucky and the Christmas Spirit" (Season 2, Episode 5) (2017)
  - "Spirit of Christmas" (2019)
- Super Monsters:
  - "Super Monsters and the Wish Star" (2018)
  - "Super Monsters Save Christmas" (2019)
  - "Santa's Super Monster Helpers" (2020)
- Team Zenko Go:
  - "Harmony Harbor Holiday Surprise" (Season 2, Episode 5) (2022)
- Trash Truck:
  - "A Trash Truck Christmas" (2020)
- Trolls: The Beat Goes On!:
  - "Snow Day" (Season 5, Episode 5A) (2019)
- True and the Rainbow Kingdom:
  - "TRUE: Winter Wishes" (Season 4, Episode 6-7) (2019)
- Wonderoos: Holiday Holiday! (2020)

=== Amazon Prime ===
- Click, Clack, Moo: "Christmas at the Farm" (2017)
- Costume Quest: "Heroes on Holiday" (Season 1, Episode 14) (2019)
- Creative Galaxy: "Baby Georgia's First Christmas/Christmas Memories" (Season 1, Episode 13) (2014)
- If You Give a Mouse a Cookie: "If You Give a Mouse a Christmas Cookie" (2016)
- Pete the Cat: "A Very Groovy Christmas" (Season 1, Episode 3) (2018)
- The Snowy Day
- Wishenpoof: "A Wish World Christmas" (Season 2, Episode 12–13) (2017)

=== Peacock ===
- Madagascar: A Little Wild: Holiday Goose Chase (2021)
- Trolls: TrollsTopia:
  - "Merry Cloudmas" (Season 4, Episode 5B) (2021)

=== Apple TV ===
- Doug Unplugs: "Botty Holidays" (Season 2, Episode 7) (2021)
- Eva the Owlet: "Eva's Moon Wish" (Season 1, Episode 9) (2024)
- Frog and Toad: "Christmas Eve" (Season 1, Episode 9) (2023)
- Get Rolling with Otis: "A Winter's Cow Tale" (Season 1, Episode 9) (2021)
- Goldie: "Goldie Christmas Special" (2026)
- Interrupting Chicken: "A Chicken Carol" (Season 1, Episode 9) (2022)
- Pinecone & Pony: "Festival of Might" (Season 2, Episode 6A) (2023)
- Pretzel and the Puppies: "Merry Muttgomery!" (Season 1, Episode 9) (2022)
- Shape Island: "The Winter Blues" (Season 1, Episode 10) (2023)
- The Snoopy Show:
  - "Twas The Nest Before Christmas/Happiness is the Gift of Giving/Do Not Open Until" (Season 2, Episode 13) (2022)
  - "Happiness is Holiday Traditions/Window Wonderland/Spike's Old-Fashioned Christmas" (Season 3, Episode 13) (2023)
- Stillwater: "The Way Home" (Season 1, Episode 13) (2021)
- Wonder Pets: In the City: "Help the Holiday Hamster!/Save the Snowman" (Season 2, Episode 13) (2026)

== Sports television Christmas games records ==
=== NFL Christmas Day television games records ===
- Longest NFL games: 82 minutes and 40 seconds: Miami Dolphins at Kansas City Chiefs, December 25, 1971 (Longest NFL game)
- Most passing yards by a player in a game: (11 times, Over 300 passing yards)
  - 367 passing yards: Boomer Esiason, at Minnesota Vikings, December 25, 1989
  - 358 passing yards: Trent Green vs. Oakland Raiders, December 25, 2004
  - 350 passing yards: Troy Aikman, at Arizona Cardinals, December 25, 1995
  - 320 passing yards: Patrick Mahomes, at Pittsburgh Steelers, December 25, 2024
  - 317 passing yards: Brett Favre, at Chicago Bears, December 25, 2005
  - 311 passing yards: Drew Brees, vs. Minnesota Vikings, December 25, 2020
  - 310 passing yards: Tua Tagovailoa, vs. Green Bay Packers, December 25, 2022
  - 307 passing yards: Dak Prescott, at Washington Commanders, December 25, 2025
  - 303 passing yards: Wade Wilson, vs. Cincinnati Bengals, December 25, 1989
  - 303 passing yards: Jake Plummer, at Tennessee Titans, December 25, 2004
  - 301 passing yards: Jalen Hurts, vs. New York Giants, December 25, 2023
- Most passing yards by a player in one half:
  - 239 passing yards: Boomer Esiason, at Minnesota Vikings, December 25, 1989 (2nd half)
  - 229 passing yards: Tua Tagovailoa, vs. Green Bay Packers, December 25, 2022 (1st half)
  - 219 passing yards: Ben Roethlisberger, vs. Baltimore Ravens, December 25, 2016 (2nd half)
- Most passing yards by a player in one quarter: 164 passing yards: Ben Roethlisberger, vs. Baltimore Ravens, December 25, 2016 (4th quarter)
- Fewest passing yards by a starting quarterback in a game: 35 passing yards: Anthony Wright, at Tennessee Titans, December 25, 2000
- Most rushing yards by a player in a game: (19 times, Over 100 rushing yards)
  - 185 rushing yards: Olandis Gary, at Detroit Lions, December 25, 1999
  - 155 rushing yards: Alvin Kamara, vs. Minnesota Vikings, December 25, 2020
  - 147 rushing yards: Derrick Henry, at Houston Texans, December 25, 2024
  - 145 rushing yards: Zamir White, at Kansas City Chiefs, December 25, 2023
  - 142 rushing yards: Chris Johnson, vs. San Diego Chargers, December 25, 2009 (NFL league leader)
  - 126 rushing yards: Nick Chubb, at Green Bay Packers, December 25, 2021
  - 122 rushing yards: Brian Westbrook at Dallas Cowboys, December 25, 2006
  - 122 rushing yards: Le'Veon Bell, vs. Baltimore Ravens, December 25, 2016
  - 121 rushing yards: Kahlil Bell, at Green Bay Packers, December 25, 2011
  - 118 rushing yards: Cam Akers, vs. Denver Broncos, December 25, 2022
  - 114 rushing yards: Gary Brown, at San Francisco 49ers, December 25, 1993
  - 110 rushing yards: Ronnie Brown, vs. New York Jets, December 25, 2006
  - 108 rushing yards: Alfred Blue, vs. Pittsburgh Steelers, December 25, 2017
  - 108 rushing yards: Jonathan Taylor, at Arizona Cardinals, December 25, 2021
  - 105 rushing yards: Thomas Jones, at Green Bay Packers, December 25, 2005
  - 105 rushing yards: Jacory Croskey-Merritt, vs. Dallas Cowboys, December 25, 2025
  - 103 rushing yards: Malik Davis, at Washington Commanders, December 25, 2025
  - 102 rushing yards: Christian McCaffrey, vs. Baltimore Ravens, December 25, 2023
  - 100 rushing yards: Wendell Hayes, vs. Miami Dolphins, December 25, 1971
- Most rushing yards by a player in one half: 174 rushing yards: Olandis Gary, at Detroit Lions, December 25, 1999 (2nd half)
- Most rushing yards by a player in one quarter: 134 rushing yards: Olandis Gary, at Detroit Lions, December 25, 1999 (3rd quarter)
- Fewest rushing yards by a player in a game: -10 rushing yards: Equanimeous St. Brown vs. Cleveland Browns, December 25, 2021
- Most receiving yards by a player in a game: (21 times, Over 100 receiving yards)
  - 203 receiving yards: Kevin Williams at Arizona Cardinals, December 25, 1995
  - 172 receiving yards: Larry Centers, vs. Dallas Cowboys, December 25, 1995
  - 160 receiving yards: Travis Kelce, vs. Denver Broncos, December 25, 2016
  - 143 receiving yards: Jaylen Waddle, vs. Green Bay Packers, December 25, 2022
  - 140 receiving yards: Paul Warfield, at Kansas City Chiefs, December 25, 1971
  - 126 receiving yards: George Kittle, vs. Baltimore Ravens, December 25, 2023
  - 124 receiving yards: Tony Gonzalez, vs. Oakland Raiders, December 25, 2004
  - 118 receiving yards: Anthony Carter, vs. Cincinnati Bengals, December 25, 1989
  - 117 receiving yards: Jerry Jeudy, at Los Angeles Rams, December 25, 2022
  - 115 receiving yards: Miles Austin, at Arizona Cardinals, December 25, 2010
  - 115 receiving yards: Jordy Nelson, vs. Chicago Bears, December 25, 2011
  - 114 receiving yards: Davante Adams, vs. Cleveland Browns, December 25, 2021
  - 113 receiving yards: Brandon Aiyuk, vs. Baltimore Ravens, December 25, 2023
  - 110 receiving yards: Ed Podolak, vs. Miami Dolphins, December 25, 1971
  - 110 receiving yards: Andre Roberts, vs. Dallas Cowboys, December 25, 2010
  - 109 receiving yards: Eddie Brown, at Minnesota Vikings, December 25, 1989
  - 108 receiving yards: Leon Washington, at Miami Dolphins, December 25, 2006
  - 107 receiving yards: Donald Driver, at Chicago Bears, December 25, 2005
  - 104 receiving yards: Elmo Wright, vs. Miami Dolphins, December 25, 1971
  - 103 receiving yards: Derrick Mason, at Minnesota Vikings, December 25, 2005
  - 103 receiving yards: Tyreek Hill, vs. Green Bay Packers, December 25, 2022
- Most receiving yards by a player in one half:
  - 124 receiving yards: Kevin Williams, at Arizona Cardinals, December 25, 1995 (1st half)
  - 123 receiving yards: Travis Kelce, vs. Denver Broncos, December 25, 2016 (1st half)
- Most receiving yards by a player in one quarter: 105 receiving yards: Travis Kelce, vs. Denver Broncos, December 25, 2016 (1st quarter)
- Fewest receiving yards by a player in a game: -6 receiving yards: Brandon Manumaleuna at Tennessee Titans, December 25, 2009
- Most receptions by a player in a game: (2 times)
  - 12 catches: James Brooks, at Minnesota Vikings, December 25, 1989
  - 12 catches: Larry Centers, vs. Dallas Cowboys, December 25, 1995
- Highest reception per reception (minimum 3 receptions) in a game: 31.0: Bernard Berrian at Green Bay Packers, December 25, 2005
- Lowest reception per reception (minimum 3 receptions) in a game: 0.0: Isiah Pacheco vs. Las Vegas Raiders, December 25, 2023 (4 reception)
- Most rushing attempts by a player in a game: 29 attempts: Olandis Gary, at Detroit Lions, December 25, 1999
- Most rushing attempts by a player in one half: 21 attempts: Olandis Gary, at Detroit Lions, December 25, 1999 (2nd half)
- Most rushing attempts by a player in one quarter: 11 attempts: Olandis Gary, at Detroit Lions, December 25, 1999 (4th quarter)
- Highest rushing per carry (minimum 10 attempts) in a game: 9.5: Jacory Croskey-Merritt, vs. Dallas Cowboys, December 25, 2025
- Lowest rushing per carry (minimum 10 attempts) in a game: 1.7: Emmitt Smith at Tennessee Titans, December 25, 2000
- Most sacks by a defensive player in a game: (5 times, Over 3.0 sacks)
  - 4.0 sacks: Chris Doleman, vs. Cincinnati Bengals, December 25, 1989
  - 3.0 sacks: Reggie Hayward, at Tennessee Titans, December 25, 2004
  - 3.0 sacks: Mike Hilton, at Houston Texans, December 25, 2017
  - 3.0 sacks: Malcolm Koonce, at Kansas City Chiefs, December 25, 2023
  - 3.0 sacks: Jer'Zhan Newton, vs. Dallas Cowboys, December 25, 2025
- Never played on NFL Christmas Day: (4 teams)
  - Atlanta Falcons
  - Carolina Panthers
  - Jacksonville Jaguars
  - New England Patriots
- Most kickoff return for a touchdown in a game: 1 touchdowns: Johnnie Morton, at Miami Dolphins, December 25, 1994
- Most punt return for a touchdown in a game: 1 touchdowns: Antonio Chatman, vs. Chicago Bears, December 25, 2005
- Most interception return for a touchdown in a game: (9 times)
  - 1 touchdowns: Brock Marion, at Arizona Cardinals, December 25, 1995
  - 1 touchdowns: Aeneas Williams, vs. Dallas Cowboys, December 25, 1995
  - 1 touchdowns: Keith Bulluck, vs. Dallas Cowboys, December 25, 2000
  - 1 touchdowns: Lance Briggs, at Chicago Bears, December 25, 2005
  - 1 touchdowns: Dominique Rodgers-Cromartie, vs. Dallas Cowboys, December 25, 2010
  - 1 touchdowns: Greg Toler, vs. Dallas Cowboys, December 25, 2010
  - 1 touchdowns: Cobie Durant, vs. Denver Broncos, December 25, 2022
  - 1 touchdowns: Adoree' Jackson, at Philadelphia Eagles, December 25, 2023
  - 1 touchdowns: Jack Jones, at Kansas City Chiefs, December 25, 2023
- Most fumble recovery for a touchdown in a game: (4 times)
  - 1 touchdowns: Henry Ford, vs. Dallas Cowboys, December 25, 2000
  - 1 touchdowns: Edwin Williams, at Green Bay Packers, December 25, 2011
  - 1 touchdowns: Derek Barnett, vs. Oakland Raiders, December 25, 2017
  - 1 touchdowns: Bilal Nichols, at Kansas City Chiefs, December 25, 2023
- Successful onside kick recovery: Dallas Cowboys at Tennessee Titans, December 25, 2000
- Longest field goal: (2 times)
  - 56 yards: Matt Gay, vs. Denver Broncos, December 25, 2022
  - 56 yards: Will Reichard, vs. Detroit Lions, December 25, 2025
- Longest missed field goal: 58 yards: Brandon Aubrey, at Washington Commanders, December 25, 2025
- Most field goal 50 or longer made in a game: (4 times)
  - 2 field goal: Matt Gay, vs. Denver Broncos, December 25, 2022
  - 2 field goal: Matt Prater, vs. Tampa Bay Buccaneers, December 25, 2022
  - 2 field goal: Brandon Aubrey, at Washington Commanders, December 25, 2025
  - 2 field goal: Will Reichard, vs. Detroit Lions, December 25, 2025
- Most passing completion in a game:
  - 32 completion: Trent Green, vs. Oakland Raiders, December 25, 2004
  - 32 completion: Tom Brady, at Arizona Cardinals, December 25, 2022
  - 31 completion: Boomer Esiason, at Minnesota Vikings, December 25, 1989
  - 30 completion: Brett Favre, at Chicago Bears, December 25, 2005
  - 30 completion: Joe Flacco, at Pittsburgh Steelers, December 25, 2016
- Most passing completion by both teams in a game: 57 completion: Tampa Bay Buccaneers (32) at Arizona Cardinals (25), December 25, 2022
- Most passing completion in one half:
  - 19 completion: Boomer Esiason, at Minnesota Vikings, December 25, 1989 (2nd half)
  - 18 completion: Trent Green, vs. Oakland Raiders, December 25, 2004 (1st half)
  - 18 completion: Ben Roethlisberger, vs. Baltimore Ravens, December 25, 2016 (2nd half)
- Most passing completion by both teams in one half: 34 completion: Pittsburgh Steelers (18) vs. Baltimore Ravens (16), December 25, 2016 (2nd half)
- Most passing completion in one quarter: (2 times)
  - 14 completion: Boomer Esiason, at Minnesota Vikings, December 25, 1989 (4th quarter)
  - 14 completion: Ben Roethlisberger, vs. Baltimore Ravens, December 25, 2016 (4th quarter)
- Most passing completion by both teams in one quarter: 23 completion: Pittsburgh Steelers (14) vs. Baltimore Ravens (9), December 25, 2016 (4th quarter)
- Most passing attempts in a game:
  - 54 attempts: Boomer Esiason, at Minnesota Vikings, December 25, 1989
  - 51 attempts: Brett Favre, at Chicago Bears, December 25, 2005
  - 48 attempts: Tom Brady, at Arizona Cardinals, December 25, 2022
- Most passing attempts by both teams in a game: 94 attempts: Tampa Bay Buccaneers (48) at Arizona Cardinals (46), December 25, 2022
- Most passing attempts in one half: 31 attempts: Boomer Esiason, at Minnesota Vikings, December 25, 1989 (2nd half)
- Most passing attempts in one quarter:
  - 22 attempts: Kyler Murray, vs. Indianapolis Colts, December 25, 2021 (4th quarter)
  - 21 attempts: Boomer Esiason, at Minnesota Vikings, December 25, 1989 (4th quarter)
- Most times sacked by a quarterback in a game: 7 sacks: Max Brosmer vs. Detroit Lions, December 25, 2025
- Trick play touchdowns: Dontari Poe passing touchdown, vs. Denver Broncos, December 25, 2016
- Most passing touchdowns by a player in a game: 5 touchdowns: Aaron Rodgers, vs. Chicago Bears, December 25, 2011
- Most passing touchdowns by a player in one half: (3 times)
  - 3 touchdowns: Aaron Rodgers, vs. Chicago Bears, December 25, 2011 (2nd half)
  - 3 touchdowns: Kirk Cousins, at New Orleans Saints, December 25, 2020 (2nd half)
  - 3 touchdowns: Aaron Rodgers, vs. Cleveland Browns, December 25, 2021 (1st half)
- Most passing touchdowns by a player in one quarter: (8 times)
  - 2 touchdowns: Trent Green, vs. Oakland Raiders, December 25, 2004 (2nd quarter)
  - 2 touchdowns: Philip Rivers, at Tennessee Titans, December 25, 2009 (2nd quarter)
  - 2 touchdowns: Aaron Rodgers, vs. Chicago Bears, December 25, 2011 (3rd quarter)
  - 2 touchdowns: Ben Roethlisberger, vs. Baltimore Ravens, December 25, 2016 (4th quarter)
  - 2 touchdowns: Kirk Cousins, at New Orleans Saints, December 25, 2020 (3rd quarter)
  - 2 touchdowns: Aaron Rodgers, vs. Cleveland Browns, December 25, 2021 (2nd quarter)
  - 2 touchdowns: Lamar Jackson, at San Francisco 49ers, December 25, 2023 (3rd quarter)
  - 2 touchdowns: Patrick Mahomes, at Pittsburgh Steelers, December 25, 2024 (1st quarter)
- Most passing interception by a team in a game: 5 interception: San Francisco 49ers vs. Baltimore Ravens, December 25, 2023
- Most passing interception by a player in a game: (2 times)
  - 4 interception: Baker Mayfield, at Green Bay Packers, December 25, 2021
  - 4 interception: Brock Purdy, vs. Baltimore Ravens, December 25, 2023
- Most passing interception by a player in one half: (2 times)
  - 3 interception: Baker Mayfield, at Green Bay Packers, December 25, 2021 (1st half)
  - 3 interception: Brock Purdy, vs. Baltimore Ravens, December 25, 2023 (1st half)
- Highest passing yards per attempts (minimum 20 attempts) in a game: 12.4: Tua Tagovailoa, vs. Green Bay Packers, December 25, 2022
- Lowest passing yards per attempts (minimum 20 attempts) in a game: 1.8: Anthony Wright, at Tennessee Titans, December 25, 2000
- Highest passing completion percentage (minimum 20 attempts) in a game: 85.7%: Baker Mayfield, vs. Denver Broncos, December 25, 2022
- Lowest passing completion percentage (minimum 20 attempts) in a game: 25.0%: Anthony Wright, at Tennessee Titans, December 25, 2000
- Highest passing rating (minimum 20 attempts) in a game: 142.7 passing rating: Aaron Rodgers, vs. Chicago Bears, December 25, 2011
- Lowest passing rating (minimum 20 attempts) in a game: 0.0 passing rating: Anthony Wright, at Tennessee Titans, December 25, 2000
- Longest NFL drive: 10:08: Detroit Lions at Minnesota Vikings, December 25, 2025
- Most kick return by a player in a game: 8 return: Jason McAddley, vs. Denver Broncos, December 25, 2004
- Most kick return by a player in one half: 5 return: Michael Wiley, at Tennessee Titans, December 25, 2000 (2nd half)
- Most kick return by a player in one quarter: 5 return: Michael Wiley, at Tennessee Titans, December 25, 2000 (3rd quarter)
- Highest kick return average (minimum 3 returns) in a game: 39.0: Johnnie Morton, at Miami Dolphins, December 25, 1994
- Highest punt return average (minimum 3 returns) in a game: 30.0: Antonio Chatman, vs. Chicago Bears, December 25, 2005
- Most punt return by a player in a game: (5 times)
  - 5 return: Leo Lewis, vs. Cincinnati Bengals, December 25, 1989
  - 5 return: Leon Washington, at Miami Dolphins, December 25, 2006
  - 5 return: Eli Rogers, at Houston Texans, December 25, 2017
  - 5 return: Pharoh Cooper, vs. Tampa Bay Buccaneers, December 25, 2022
  - 5 return: Kalif Raymond, at Minnesota Vikings, December 25, 2025
- Most punt return by a player in one half: 4 return: Eli Rogers, at Houston Texans, December 25, 2017 (2nd half)
- Most punt return by a player in one quarter: 3 return: Leon Washington, at Miami Dolphins, December 25, 2006 (3rd quarter)
- Most combined return by a player in a game: 9 return: Andre Roberts, December 25, 2010
- Most combined return by a player in one half: 7 return: Andre Roberts, December 25, 2010 (2nd half)
- Most combined return by a player in one quarter: 5 return: Michael Wiley, at Tennessee Titans, December 25, 2000 (3rd quarter)
- Most kick return yards by a player in a game: 175 kick return yards: Dante Hall, vs. Oakland Raiders, December 25, 2004
- Most punt return yards by a player in a game:
  - 90 punt return yards: Antonio Chatman, vs. Chicago Bears, December 25, 2005
  - 88 punt return yards: Leo Lewis, vs. Cincinnati Bengals, December 25, 1989
  - 82 punt return yards: Eli Rogers, at Houston Texans, December 25, 2017
- Most combined return yards by a player in a game: 180 return yards: Dante Hall, vs. Oakland Raiders, December 25, 2004
- Most extra points made in a game: 7 extra points: Wil Lutz, vs. Minnesota Vikings, December 25, 2020
- Most extra points attempts in a game: 7 attempts: Wil Lutz, vs. Minnesota Vikings, December 25, 2020
- Missed extra points on Christmas Day: (6 times)
  - David Buehler, at Arizona Cardinals, December 25, 2010
  - Cairo Santos, vs. Denver Broncos, December 25, 2016
  - Dan Bailey, at New Orleans Saints, December 25, 2020
  - Matt Prater, vs. Indianapolis Colts, December 25, 2021
  - Chris Naggar, at Green Bay Packers, December 25, 2021 (First and only career games)
  - Harrison Butker, at Pittsburgh Steelers, December 25, 2024
- Most consecutive extra points: 73 consecutive made: December 25, 1971 to December 25, 2010
- Most total yards by a player in a game:
  - 350 total yards: Ed Podolak, vs. Miami Dolphins, December 25, 1971 (NFL Playoff Records)
  - 307 total yards: Kevin Williams, at Arizona Cardinals, December 25, 1995
- Most total yards by a player in one half: 190 total yards: Kevin Williams, at Arizona Cardinals, December 25, 1995 (1st half)
- Most total yards by a player in one quarter: 134 total yards: Olandis Gary, at Detroit Lions, December 25, 1999 (3rd quarter)
- Most total yards by one team in a game: 583 total yards: New Orleans Saints vs. Minnesota Vikings, December 25, 2020
- Most total yards by one team in one half: 330 total yards: Kansas City Chiefs vs. Denver Broncos, December 25, 2016 (1st half)
- Most total yards by one team in one quarter: 223 total yards: Kansas City Chiefs vs. Denver Broncos, December 25, 2016 (1st quarter)
- Fewest total yards by one team in a game: 95 total yards: Dallas Cowboys at Tennessee Titans, December 25, 2000
- Fewest total yards by one team in one half:
  - 28 total yards: Tennessee Titans vs. Denver Broncos, December 25, 2004 (2nd half)
  - 32 total yards: Dallas Cowboys at Tennessee Titans, December 25, 2000 (2nd half)
  - 36 total yards: Minnesota Vikings vs. Detroit Lions, December 25, 2025 (1st half)
- Fewest total yards by one team in one quarter:
  - -18 total yards: Kansas City Chiefs vs. Las Vegas Raiders, December 25, 2023 (1st quarter)
  - -6 total yards: Tennessee Titans vs. Denver Broncos, December 25, 2004 (3rd quarter)
  - 0 total yards: Kansas City Chiefs vs. Denver Broncos, December 25, 2025 (3rd quarter)
  - 2 total yards: Dallas Cowboys at Tennessee Titans, December 25, 2000 (3rd quarter)
  - 2 total yards: Minnesota Vikings vs. Detroit Lions, December 25, 2025 (2nd quarter)
- Fewest total yards by both teams in a game: 392 total yards: Minnesota Vikings (161) vs. Detroit Lions (231), December 25, 2025
- Fewest total yards by both teams in one half: 155 total yards: Minnesota Vikings (36) vs. Detroit Lions (119), December 25, 2025 (1st half)
- Fewest total yards by both teams in one quarter:
  - 60 total yards: Las Vegas Raiders (78) at Kansas City Chiefs (-18), December 25, 2023 (1st quarter)
  - 62 total yards: Dallas Cowboys (2) at Tennessee Titans (60), December 25, 2000 (3rd quarter)
- Most punts in a game: 10 punts: Donnie Jones vs. New York Jets, December 25, 2006
- Most punts in one half: (2 times)
  - 6 punts: Donnie Jones vs. New York Jets, December 25, 2006 (1st half)
  - 6 punts: Ben Graham at Miami Dolphins, December 25, 2006 (1st half)
- Most punts in one quarter: (2 times)
  - 4 punts: Donnie Jones vs. New York Jets, December 25, 2006 (2nd quarter)
  - 4 punts: Ben Graham at Miami Dolphins, December 25, 2006 (2nd quarter)
- Most punts by both teams in a game: 18 punts: New York Jets (8) at Miami Dolphins (10), December 25, 2006
- Most punts by both teams in one half: 12 punts: New York Jets (6) at Miami Dolphins (6), December 25, 2006 (1st half)
- Most punts by both teams in one quarter: 8 punts: New York Jets (4) at Miami Dolphins (4), December 25, 2006 (2nd quarter)
- Highest punting average (minimum 4 punts) in a game: 53.8: Matt Araiza at Pittsburgh Steelers, December 25, 2024
- Punter completion the pass: Andy Lee vs. Tampa Bay Buccaneers, December 25, 2022
- Most turnovers by one team in a game: 6 turnovers: Detroit Lions at Minnesota Vikings, December 25, 2025
- Longest runs scrimmage:
  - 72 yards: Jacory Croskey-Merritt, vs. Dallas Cowboys, December 25, 2025
  - 70 yards: Tyreek Hill, vs. Denver Broncos, December 25, 2016
  - 65 yards: Jordan Addison, vs. Detroit Lions, December 25, 2025
- Longest pass completion:
  - 86 yards: Dak Prescott to KaVontae Turpin, at Washington Commanders, December 25, 2025
  - 84 yards: Tua Tagovailoa to Jaylen Waddle, vs. Green Bay Packers, December 25, 2022
  - 80 yards: Alex Smith to Travis Kelce, vs. Denver Broncos, December 25, 2016
- Longest kick return: (2 times)
  - 93 yards: Johnnie Morton, at Miami Dolphins, December 25, 1994
  - 93 yards: Keisean Nixon, at Miami Dolphins, December 25, 2022 (no TD)
- Longest punt return: 85 yards: Antonio Chatman, vs. Chicago Bears, December 25, 2005
- Most fumble by a player in a game: (3 times)
  - 3 fumbles: Anthony Wright, at Tennessee Titans, December 25, 2000
  - 3 fumbles: T. J. Yates, vs. Pittsburgh Steelers, December 25, 2017
  - 3 fumbles: Jared Goff, at Minnesota Vikings, December 25, 2025
- Most fumbles lost by a player in a game: 3 fumbles lost: Jared Goff, Detroit Lions at Minnesota Vikings, December 25, 2025
- Most fumble by one team in a game: 8 fumbles: Dallas Cowboys at Tennessee Titans, December 25, 2000
- Most fumble by both team in a game: 10 fumbles: Dallas Cowboys (8) at Tennessee Titans (2), December 25, 2000
- Most fumble by one team in one half: 5 fumbles: Dallas Cowboys at Tennessee Titans, December 25, 2000 (2nd half)
- Most field goals missed in a game: 3 field goal missed: Jan Stenerud, vs. Miami Dolphins, December 25, 1971
- Most two-point conversions in a game: (5 times)
  - 1 conversions: Josh McCown, at Green Bay Packers, December 25, 2011
  - 1 conversions: Steve Smith Sr., at Pittsburgh Steelers, December 25, 2016
  - 1 conversions: Latavius Murray, at Los Angeles Rams, December 25, 2022
  - 1 conversions: Brandon Bolden, at Kansas City Chiefs, December 25, 2023
  - 1 conversions: Saquon Barkley, at Philadelphia Eagles, December 25, 2023
- Most games played by NFL head coaches: 5 games: Andy Reid, 1999-present
- Most wins by NFL head coaches: 3 wins: Andy Reid, 1999-present
- Most losses by NFL head coaches: 2 losses: Andy Reid, 1999-present
- Oldest NFL player to play Christmas Day: 45 years and 162 days: Gary Anderson, vs. Denver Broncos, December 25, 2004
- Youngest NFL player to play Christmas Day: 21 years and 11 days: Randy Starks, vs. Denver Broncos, December 25, 2004
- Most fumbles forced in a game: (2 times)
  - 2 fumbles: Jason Fisk, vs. Dallas Cowboys, December 25, 2000
  - 2 fumbles: Randall Godfrey, vs. Dallas Cowboys, December 25, 2000
- Most fumbles recovered in a game: (6 times)
  - 2 fumbles: Chris Spielman, at Miami Dolphins, December 25, 1994
  - 2 fumbles: Larry Allen, at Tennessee Titans, December 25, 2000
  - 2 fumbles: Daniel Sorensen, vs. Denver Broncos, December 25, 2016
  - 2 fumbles: T. J. Yates, vs. Pittsburgh Steelers, December 25, 2017
  - 2 fumbles: Kyler Murray, vs. Indianapolis Colts, December 25, 2021
  - 2 fumbles: Andrew Van Ginkel, vs. Detroit Lions, December 25, 2025
- Most consecutive field goals:
  - 17 consecutive made: December 25, 2023 to December 25, 2025
  - 15 consecutive made: December 25, 2022 to December 25, 2023
  - 11 consecutive made: December 25, 1994 to December 25, 2000
  - 10 consecutive made: December 25, 2025 to present
- Most points by a player in a game: 36 points: Alvin Kamara, vs. Minnesota Vikings, December 25, 2020
- Most touchdowns by a player in a game: 6 touchdowns: Alvin Kamara, vs. Minnesota Vikings, December 25, 2020 (Tied NFL Records)
- Most touchdowns by a player in one half: (3 times)
  - 3 touchdowns: Bernie Parmalee, vs. Detroit Lions, December 25, 1994 (1st half)
  - 3 touchdowns: Alvin Kamara, vs. Minnesota Vikings, December 25, 2020 (1st half)
  - 3 touchdowns: Alvin Kamara, vs. Minnesota Vikings, December 25, 2020 (2nd half)
- Most touchdowns by a player in one quarter: (5 times)
  - 2 touchdowns: Bernie Parmalee, vs. Detroit Lions, December 25, 1994 (2nd quarter)
  - 2 touchdowns: Reuben Droughns, at Tennessee Titans, December 25, 2004 (1st quarter)
  - 2 touchdowns: Le'Veon Bell, vs. Baltimore Ravens, December 25, 2016 (4th quarter)
  - 2 touchdowns: Alvin Kamara, vs. Minnesota Vikings, December 25, 2020 (1st quarter)
  - 2 touchdowns: Alvin Kamara, vs. Minnesota Vikings, December 25, 2020 (4th quarter)
- Most rushing touchdowns by a player in a game: 6 touchdowns: Alvin Kamara, vs. Minnesota Vikings, December 25, 2020 (Tied NFL Records, Ernie Nevers)
- Most rushing touchdowns by a player in one half: (3 times)
  - 3 touchdowns: Bernie Parmalee, vs. Detroit Lions, December 25, 1994 (1st half)
  - 3 touchdowns: Alvin Kamara, vs. Minnesota Vikings, December 25, 2020 (1st half)
  - 3 touchdowns: Alvin Kamara, vs. Minnesota Vikings, December 25, 2020 (2nd half)
- Most receiving touchdowns in a game: (7 times)
  - 2 touchdowns: Kevin Williams, at Arizona Cardinals, December 25, 1995
  - 2 touchdowns: Tony Gonzalez, vs. Oakland Raiders, December 25, 2004
  - 2 touchdowns: Jordy Nelson, vs. Chicago Bears, December 25, 2011
  - 2 touchdowns: James Jones, vs. Chicago Bears, December 25, 2011
  - 2 touchdowns: Irv Smith Jr., at New Orleans Saints, December 25, 2020
  - 2 touchdowns: Davante Adams, vs. Cleveland Browns, December 25, 2021
  - 2 touchdowns: Tyler Higbee, vs. Denver Broncos, December 25, 2022
- Most interceptions by a player in a game: (6 times)
  - 2 interceptions: Kyle Hamilton, at San Francisco 49ers, December 25, 2023
  - 2 interceptions: Cobie Durant, vs. Denver Broncos, December 25, 2022
  - 2 interceptions: Marco Wilson, vs. Tampa Bay Buccaneers, December 25, 2022
  - 2 interceptions: Rasul Douglas, vs. Cleveland Browns, December 25, 2021
  - 2 interceptions: Chris Harris, at Green Bay Packers, December 25, 2005
  - 2 interceptions: Mike McGruder, vs. Houston Oilers, December 25, 1993
- Most interceptions by a player in one quarter: 2 interceptions: Chris Harris, at Green Bay Packers, December 25, 2005 (4th quarter)
- Most field goals in a game: 5 field goal: Rich Karlis, vs. Cincinnati Bengals, December 25, 1989
- Most field goals attempts in a game: 6 attempts: Rich Karlis, vs. Cincinnati Bengals, December 25, 1989
- Most field goals in one half: 5 field goal: Rich Karlis, vs. Cincinnati Bengals, December 25, 1989 (1st half) (Vikings franchise records, Tied NFL Records)
- Most field goals in one quarter: 3 field goal: Rich Karlis, vs. Cincinnati Bengals, December 25, 1989 (2nd quarter) (Vikings tied franchise records)
- Most field goals by both teams in a game: 7 field goal: Tampa Bay Buccaneers (4) at Arizona Cardinals (3), December 25, 2022
- Most field goals by both teams in one half: (2 times)
  - 5 field goal: Minnesota Vikings (5) vs. Cincinnati Bengals (0), December 25, 1989 (1st half)
  - 5 field goal: Baltimore Ravens (2) vs. Minnesota Vikings (3), December 25, 2005 (2nd half)
- Most field goals by both teams in one quarter: (3 times)
  - 3 field goal: Minnesota Vikings (3) vs. Cincinnati Bengals (0), December 25, 1989 (2nd quarter)
  - 3 field goal: Oakland Raiders (2) at Kansas City Chiefs (1), December 25, 2004 (4th quarter)
  - 3 field goal: Baltimore Ravens (2) vs. Minnesota Vikings (1), December 25, 2005 (4th quarter)
- Most blocked kicks in a game: (3 times)
  - 1 blocked kicks: Dick Anderson, at Kansas City Chiefs, December 25, 1971
  - 1 blocked kicks: Eddie Robinson Jr., at San Francisco 49ers, December 25, 1993
  - 1 blocked kicks: Langston Walker, at Kansas City Chiefs, December 25, 2004
- Most blocked field goal in a game: (3 times)
  - 1 blocked kicks: Dick Anderson, at Kansas City Chiefs, December 25, 1971
  - 1 blocked kicks: Eddie Robinson Jr., at San Francisco 49ers, December 25, 1993
  - 1 blocked kicks: Langston Walker, at Kansas City Chiefs, December 25, 2004
- Most blocked extra points in a game: None
- Most blocked punts in a game: None
- Most safety in a game: (4 times)
  - 1 safety: Alan Page, Minnesota Vikings vs. Dallas Cowboys, December 25, 1971
  - 1 safety: Indianapolis Colts at Arizona Cardinals, December 25, 2021
  - 1 safety: San Francisco 49ers vs. Baltimore Ravens, December 25, 2023
  - 1 safety: Kamari Lassiter, Houston Texans vs. Baltimore Ravens, December 25, 2024
- Largest margin of victory:
  - 37 points: Los Angeles Rams (51) vs. Denver Broncos (14), December 25, 2022
  - 31 points: Tennessee Titans (31) vs. Dallas Cowboys (0), December 25, 2000
- Most points by one teams in a game:
  - 52 points: New Orleans Saints vs. Minnesota Vikings, December 25, 2020
  - 51 points: Los Angeles Rams vs. Denver Broncos, December 25, 2022
- Most points by both teams in a game: 85 points: New Orleans Saints (52) vs. Minnesota Vikings (33), December 25, 2020
- Fewest points by one teams in a game:
  - 0 points: Dallas Cowboys at Tennessee Titans, December 25, 2000
  - 2 points: Houston Texans vs. Baltimore Ravens, December 25, 2024
  - 6 points: Houston Texans vs. Pittsburgh Steelers, December 25, 2017
- Fewest points by both teams in a game: 17 points: San Francisco 49ers (7) vs. Houston Oilers (10), December 25, 1993
- Most points by one teams in first quarter:
  - 21 points: Kansas City Chiefs vs. Denver Broncos, December 25, 2016
  - 17 points: Dallas Cowboys at Arizona Cardinals, December 25, 1995
  - 17 points: Denver Broncos at Tennessee Titans, December 25, 2004
  - 17 points: Los Angeles Rams vs. Denver Broncos, December 25, 2022
- Most points by one teams in second quarter: 20 points: Miami Dolphins vs. Detroit Lions, December 25, 1994
- Most points by one teams in third quarter:
  - 24 points: Tennessee Titans vs. Dallas Cowboys, December 25, 2000
  - 17 points: Baltimore Ravens at San Francisco 49ers, December 25, 2023
  - 15 points: New York Giants at Philadelphia Eagles, December 25, 2023
- Most points by one teams in fourth quarter:
  - 21 points: Pittsburgh Steelers vs. Baltimore Ravens, December 25, 2016
  - 21 points: New Orleans Saints vs. Minnesota Vikings, December 25, 2020
- Most points by one teams in first half:
  - 31 points: Los Angeles Rams vs. Denver Broncos, December 25, 2022
  - 27 points: Miami Dolphins vs. Detroit Lions, December 25, 1994
- Most points by one teams in second half:
  - 28 points: New Orleans Saints vs. Minnesota Vikings, December 25, 2020
  - 24 points: Pittsburgh Steelers vs. Baltimore Ravens, December 25, 2016
  - 24 points: Tennessee Titans vs. Dallas Cowboys, December 25, 2000
- Most points by both teams in first quarter:
  - 28 points: Kansas City Chiefs (21) vs. Denver Broncos (7), December 25, 2016
  - 27 points: Denver Broncos (17) at Tennessee Titans (10), December 25, 2004
  - 21 points: New Orleans Saints (14) vs. Minnesota Vikings (7), December 25, 2020
  - 20 points: Green Bay Packers (10) at Miami Dolphins (10), December 25, 2022
- Most points by both teams in second quarter:
  - 28 points: Kansas City Chiefs (14) vs. Oakland Raiders (14), December 25, 2004
  - 27 points: Miami Dolphins (20) vs. Detroit Lions (7), December 25, 1994
  - 24 points: Dallas Cowboys (17) at Washington Commanders (7), December 25, 2025
  - 23 points: Minnesota Vikings (16) vs. Cincinnati Bengals (7), December 25, 1989
- Most points by both teams in third quarter:
  - 24 points: Dallas Cowboys (0) at Tennessee Titans (24), December 25, 2000
  - 21 points: Green Bay Packers (14) vs. Chicago Bears (7), December 25, 2011
  - 20 points: New Orleans Saints (13) vs. Minnesota Vikings (7), December 25, 2020
- Most points by both teams in fourth quarter:
  - 31 points: Pittsburgh Steelers (21) vs. Baltimore Ravens (10), December 25, 2016
  - 27 points: New Orleans Saints (21) vs. Minnesota Vikings (6), December 25, 2020
  - 25 points: Los Angeles Rams (17) vs. Denver Broncos (8), December 25, 2022
- Most points by both teams in first half:
  - 42 points: Kansas City Chiefs (21) vs. Oakland Raiders (21), December 25, 2004
  - 40 points: Denver Broncos (24) at Tennessee Titans (16), December 25, 2004
  - 38 points: New Orleans Saints (24) vs. Minnesota Vikings (10), December 25, 2020
  - 37 points: Miami Dolphins (27) vs. Detroit Lions (10), December 25, 1994
  - 37 points: Los Angeles Rams (31) vs. Denver Broncos (6), December 25, 2022
- Most points by both teams in second half:
  - 47 points: New Orleans Saints (28) vs. Minnesota Vikings (19), December 25, 2020
  - 45 points: Pittsburgh Steelers (24) vs. Baltimore Ravens (21), December 25, 2016
  - 39 points: Green Bay Packers (21) vs. Chicago Bears (18), December 25, 2011
  - 35 points: New York Giants (22) at Philadelphia Eagles (13), December 25, 2023
- Fewest points by both teams in first half: (2 times)
  - 0 points: Detroit Lions vs. Denver Broncos, December 25, 1995
  - 0 points: Miami Dolphins vs. New York Jets, December 25, 2006
- Fewest points by both teams in second half: 7 points: San Francisco 49ers (7) vs. Houston Oilers (0), December 25, 1993
- Longest scoreless streak: 49 minutes and 29 seconds: December 25, 2006
- Games ended NFL Scorigami: New Orleans Saints (52) vs. Minnesota Vikings (33), December 25, 2020
- Most touchdowns by one team in a game: 7 touchdowns: New Orleans Saints vs. Minnesota Vikings, December 25, 2020
- Most touchdowns by one team in one half: (2 times)
  - 4 touchdowns: New Orleans Saints vs. Minnesota Vikings, December 25, 2020 (2nd half)
  - 4 touchdowns: Los Angeles Rams vs. Denver Broncos, December 25, 2022 (1st half)
- Most touchdowns by one team in one quarter: (4 times)
  - 3 touchdowns: Tennessee Titans vs. Dallas Cowboys, December 25, 2000 (3rd quarter)
  - 3 touchdowns: Kansas City Chiefs vs. Denver Broncos, December 25, 2016 (1st quarter)
  - 3 touchdowns: Pittsburgh Steelers vs. Baltimore Ravens, December 25, 2016 (4th quarter)
  - 3 touchdowns: New Orleans Saints vs. Minnesota Vikings, December 25, 2020 (4th quarter)
- Most touchdowns by both teams in a game: 12 touchdowns: New Orleans Saints (7) vs. Minnesota Vikings (5), December 25, 2020
- Most touchdowns by both teams in one half: 7 touchdowns: New Orleans Saints (4) vs. Minnesota Vikings (3), December 25, 2020 (2nd half)
- Most touchdowns by both teams in one quarter: (4 times)
  - 4 touchdowns: Kansas City Chiefs (2) vs. Oakland Raiders (2), December 25, 2004 (2nd quarter)
  - 4 touchdowns: Kansas City Chiefs (3) vs. Denver Broncos (1), December 25, 2016 (1st quarter)
  - 4 touchdowns: Pittsburgh Steelers (3) vs. Baltimore Ravens (1), December 25, 2016 (4th quarter)
  - 4 touchdowns: New Orleans Saints (3) vs. Minnesota Vikings (1), December 25, 2020 (4th quarter)
- Most rushing touchdowns by one team in a game: 7 touchdowns: New Orleans Saints vs. Minnesota Vikings, December 25, 2020
- Most rushing touchdowns by one team in one half: 4 touchdowns: New Orleans Saints vs. Minnesota Vikings, December 25, 2020 (2nd half)
- Most rushing touchdowns by one team in one quarter: 3 touchdowns: New Orleans Saints vs. Minnesota Vikings, December 25, 2020 (4th quarter)
- Most rushing touchdowns by both teams in a game: 9 touchdowns: New Orleans Saints (7) vs. Minnesota Vikings (2), December 25, 2020 (Tied NFL Records)
- Most first downs by one team in a game: 36 first downs: New Orleans Saints vs. Minnesota Vikings, December 25, 2020
- Most first downs by both teams in a game: 61 first downs: New Orleans Saints (36) vs. Minnesota Vikings (25), December 25, 2020
- Fewest first downs by one team in a game: 6 first downs: Dallas Cowboys at Tennessee Titans, December 25, 2000
- Fewest first downs by both teams in a game: 27 first downs: Detroit Lions (16) at Minnesota Vikings (11), December 25, 2025

=== NFL Christmas Eve television games records ===
- Longest NFL game: 75 minutes and 43 seconds: Baltimore Colts vs. Oakland Raiders, December 24, 1977 (Ghost to the Post)
- Most passing yards by a player in a game: (47 times, Over 300 passing yards)
  - 481 passing yards: Vinny Testaverde, at Baltimore Ravens, December 24, 2000
  - 411 passing yards: Nick Mullens, vs. Detroit Lions, December 24, 2023
  - 388 passing yards: Marc Bulger, vs. Washington Redskins, December 24, 2006
  - 382 passing yards: Blake Bortles, at San Francisco 49ers, December 24, 2017
  - 382 passing yards: Sam Bradford, at Green Bay Packers, December 24, 2016
  - 375 passing yards: Joe Burrow, at New England Patriots, December 24, 2022
  - 373 passing yards: Matthew Stafford, vs. San Diego Chargers, December 24, 2011
  - 368 passing yards: Joe Flacco, at Houston Texans, December 24, 2023
  - 367 passing yards: Jameis Winston, at Carolina Panthers, December 24, 2017
  - 365 passing yards: Brett Favre, at Minnesota Vikings, December 24, 2004
  - 355 passing yards: Gardner Minshew, at Dallas Cowboys, December 24, 2022
  - 355 passing yards: Jared Goff, at Carolina Panthers, December 24, 2022
  - 354 passing yards: Jamie Martin, vs. San Francisco 49ers, December 24, 2005
  - 350 passing yards: Russell Wilson, vs. Arizona Cardinals, December 24, 2016
  - 350 passing yards: Matt Hasselbeck, vs. Jacksonville Jaguars, December 24, 2011
  - 347 passing yards: Dak Prescott, vs. Philadelphia Eagles, December 24, 2022
  - 347 passing yards: Aaron Rodgers, vs. Minnesota Vikings, December 24, 2016
  - 345 passing yards: Ken Stabler, at Baltimore Colts, December 24, 1977
  - 343 passing yards: Jim Everett, at Denver Broncos, December 24, 1994
  - 343 passing yards: Joe Namath, at San Diego Chargers, December 24, 1967
  - 339 passing yards: Dan Marino, vs. Kansas City Chiefs, December 24, 1989
  - 334 passing yards: Daniel Jones, at Minnesota Vikings, December 24, 2022
  - 334 passing yards: Chris Miller, vs. Detroit Lions, December 24, 1989
  - 329 passing yards: Tyrod Taylor, vs. Buffalo Bills, December 24, 2016
  - 325 passing yards: Blake Bortles, vs. Tennessee Titans, December 24, 2016
  - 325 passing yards: Vinny Testaverde, at Jacksonville Jaguars, December 24, 1995
  - 325 passing yards: Bubby Brister, at Cincinnati Bengals, December 24, 1994
  - 323 passing yards: Matt Barkley, vs. Washington Redskins, December 24, 2016
  - 322 passing yards: Philip Rivers, at Cleveland Browns, December 24, 2016
  - 320 passing yards: Mark Rypien, vs. Miami Dolphins, December 24, 1995
  - 320 passing yards: John Elway, at Oakland Raiders, December 24, 1995
  - 318 passing yards: Neil O'Donnell, at Green Bay Packers, December 24, 1995
  - 317 passing yards: Jay Schroeder, at Atlanta Falcons, December 24, 1994
  - 316 passing yards: Steve Young, at Atlanta Falcons, December 24, 1995
  - 313 passing yards: Steve Grogan, vs. Los Angeles Rams, December 24, 1989
  - 312 passing yards: Bryce Young, vs. Green Bay Packers, December 24, 2023
  - 312 passing yards: Drew Bledsoe, vs. Miami Dolphins, December 24, 2000
  - 312 passing yards: Bob Waterfield, at Cleveland Browns, December 24, 1950
  - 308 passing yards: Kelly Holcomb, at Cincinnati Bengals, December 24, 2005
  - 306 passing yards: Dan Pastorini, at Miami Dolphins, December 24, 1978
  - 305 passing yards: Billy Joe Tolliver, vs. Denver Broncos, December 24, 1989
  - 304 passing yards: Alex Smith, vs. Miami Dolphins, December 24, 2017
  - 304 passing yards: Tom Brady, vs. Miami Dolphins, December 24, 2011
  - 304 passing yards: Chris Miller, vs. Washington Redskins, December 24, 1994
  - 301 passing yards: Jared Goff, at Tennessee Titans, December 24, 2017
  - 301 passing yards: Brett Favre, vs. Pittsburgh Steelers, December 24, 1995
  - 300 passing yards: Kyle Orton, vs. Oakland Raiders, December 24, 2011
- Most passing yards in one half: 284 passing yards: Joe Burrow, at New England Patriots, December 24, 2022 (1st half)
- Most passing yards in one quarter: 204 passing yards: John Skelton, at Cincinnati Bengals, December 24, 2011 (4th quarter)
- Most pass attempts by a player in a game:
  - 69 attempts: Vinny Testaverde, at Baltimore Ravens, December 24, 2000
  - 66 attempts: Chris Miller, vs. Detroit Lions, December 24, 1989
- Most pass attempts by a player in one half: 42 attempts: Vinny Testaverde, at Baltimore Ravens, December 24, 2000 (2nd half)
- Most pass attempts by a player in one quarter: 31 attempts: Davis Mills, vs. Cleveland Browns, December 24, 2023 (4th quarter)
- Most pass completion in a game: 40 completion: Joe Burrow, at New England Patriots, December 24, 2022
- Most pass completion in one half: 28 completion: Joe Burrow, at New England Patriots, December 24, 2022 (1st half)
- Most pass completion in one quarter: 17 completion: Sam Bradford, at Green Bay Packers, December 24, 2016 (4th quarter)
- Most passing touchdowns in a game: 5 touchdowns: Rich Gannon, vs. Carolina Panthers, December 24, 2000
- Most passing touchdowns in one half: 4 touchdowns: Russell Wilson, vs. Arizona Cardinals, December 24, 2016 (2nd half)
- Most passing touchdowns in one quarter: 3 touchdowns: Russell Wilson, vs. Arizona Cardinals, December 24, 2016 (4th quarter)
- Most passing interception in a game: (3 times)
  - 5 interception: Matt Barkley, vs. Washington Redskins, December 24, 2016
  - 5 interception: Mike Phipps, at Miami Dolphins, December 24, 1972
  - 5 interception: George Blanda, at San Diego Chargers, December 24, 1961
- Most passing interception in one half: 4 interception: Matt Barkley, vs. Washington Redskins, December 24, 2016 (2nd half)
- Most rushing yards by a player in a game: (62 times, Over 100 rushing yards)
  - 220 rushing yards: Marshall Faulk, at New Orleans Saints, December 24, 2000
  - 210 rushing yards: Greg Bell, at New England Patriots, December 24, 1989
  - 206 rushing yards: Jay Ajayi, at Buffalo Bills, December 24, 2016
  - 194 rushing yards: Julius Jones, at Carolina Panthers, December 24, 2005
  - 189 rushing yards: Brad Hubbert, vs. New York Jets, December 24, 1967
  - 172 rushing yards: Ricky Williams, vs. Tennessee Titans, December 24, 2005
  - 165 rushing yards: D'Onta Foreman, vs. Detroit Lions, December 24, 2022
  - 158 rushing yards: Barry Sanders, at Atlanta Falcons, December 24, 1989
  - 153 rushing yards: Ron Dayne, vs. Indianapolis Colts, December 24, 2006
  - 150 rushing yards: Steven Jackson, vs. Washington Redskins, December 24, 2006
  - 150 rushing yards: Cadillac Williams, vs. Atlanta Falcons, December 24, 2005
  - 145 rushing yards: Bilal Powell, vs. Los Angeles Chargers, December 24, 2017
  - 140 rushing yards: Shaun Alexander, vs. San Diego Chargers, December 24, 2006
  - 139 rushing yards: Shaun Alexander, vs. Indianapolis Colts, December 24, 2005
  - 135 rushing yards: Travis Henry, at Buffalo Bills, December 24, 2006
  - 132 rushing yards: Evan Royster, vs. Minnesota Vikings, December 24, 2011
  - 132 rushing yards: Marcus Allen, at Los Angeles Raiders, December 24, 1994
  - 131 rushing yards: Maurice Jones-Drew, vs. New England Patriots, December 24, 2006
  - 131 rushing yards: Larry Johnson, vs. San Diego Chargers, December 24, 2005
  - 130 rushing yards: Willie Parker, at Cleveland Browns, December 24, 2005
  - 129 rushing yards: Dion Lewis, vs. Buffalo Bills, December 24, 2017
  - 129 rushing yards: Ladell Betts, at St. Louis Rams, December 24, 2006
  - 129 rushing yards: Rudi Johnson, at Denver Broncos, December 24, 2006
  - 128 rushing yards: LeSean McCoy, vs. Miami Dolphins, December 24, 2016
  - 128 rushing yards: Edgerrin James, vs. Minnesota Vikings, December 24, 2000
  - 127 rushing yards: Aaron Jones, at Carolina Panthers, December 24, 2023
  - 126 rushing yards: Derrick Henry, vs. Houston Texans, December 24, 2022
  - 126 rushing yards: Reggie Bush, at New York Giants, December 24, 2006
  - 125 rushing yards: Chuba Hubbard, vs. Detroit Lions, December 24, 2022
  - 123 rushing yards: LaDainian Tomlinson, at Seattle Seahawks, December 24, 2006
  - 122 rushing yards: Rashaan Salaam, vs. Philadelphia Eagles, December 24, 1995
  - 120 rushing yards: Stephen Davis, vs. Arizona Cardinals, December 24, 2000
  - 119 rushing yards: Jordan Howard, vs. Washington Redskins, December 24, 2016
  - 118 rushing yards: Todd Gurley, at Tennessee Titans, December 24, 2017
  - 116 rushing yards: Giovani Bernard, vs. Detroit Lions, December 24, 2017
  - 116 rushing yards: Rashard Mendenhall, vs. St. Louis Rams, December 24, 2011
  - 115 rushing yards: Scottie Graham, at Cincinnati Bengals, December 24, 1995
  - 113 rushing yards: Reggie Bush, at New England Patriots, December 24, 2011
  - 113 rushing yards: Greg Hill, vs. Seattle Seahawks, December 24, 1995
  - 112 rushing yards: Khalil Herbert, vs. Arizona Cardinals, December 24, 2023
  - 112 rushing yards: Peyton Hillis, at Baltimore Ravens, December 24, 2011
  - 111 rushing yards: C. J. Spiller, vs. Denver Broncos, December 24, 2011
  - 110 rushing yards: Emmitt Smith, at New Orleans Saints, December 24, 1999
  - 109 rushing yards: Toby Gerhart, at Washington Redskins, December 24, 2011
  - 109 rushing yards: Maurice Hicks, at St. Louis Rams, December 24, 2005
  - 108 rushing yards: Deuce McAllister, at New York Giants, December 24, 2006
  - 108 rushing yards: Clinton Portis, vs. New York Giants, December 24, 2005
  - 108 rushing yards: Aaron Craver, at Oakland Raiders, December 24, 1995
  - 107 rushing yards: Kenneth Walker III, at Kansas City Chiefs, December 24, 2022
  - 107 rushing yards: Doug Martin, vs. Denver Broncos, December 24, 2018
  - 107 rushing yards: Marshawn Lynch, vs. San Francisco 49ers, December 24, 2011
  - 107 rushing yards: LaDainian Tomlinson, vs. Denver Broncos, December 24, 2007
  - 107 rushing yards: Jamal Anderson, vs. Kansas City Chiefs, December 24, 2000
  - 106 rushing yards: Devin Singletary, at Chicago Bears, December 24, 2022
  - 105 rushing yards: Edgerrin James, at San Francisco 49ers, December 24, 2006
  - 103 rushing yards: Steven Jackson, at Pittsburgh Steelers, December 24, 2011
  - 103 rushing yards: Maurice Jones-Drew, at Tennessee Titans, December 24, 2011
  - 102 rushing yards: DeShaun Foster, at Atlanta Falcons, December 24, 2006
  - 101 rushing yards: Fred Taylor, at Houston Texans, December 24, 2005
  - 101 rushing yards: Larry Brown, vs. Green Bay Packers, December 24, 1972
  - 100 rushing yards: Joseph Addai, at Houston Texans, December 24, 2006
  - 100 rushing yards: Edgar Bennett, at Tampa Bay Buccaneers, December 24, 1994
- Most rushing yards by a player in one half: 133 rushing yards: Marshall Faulk, at New Orleans Saints, December 24, 2000 (2nd half)
- Most rushing yards by a player in one quarter:
  - 126 rushing yards: Brad Hubbert, vs. New York Jets, December 24, 1967 (2nd quarter) (This NFL play by play date only go back 1977 NFL season)
  - 90 rushing yards: Marshall Faulk, at New Orleans Saints, December 24, 2000 (4th quarter)
- Most rushing attempts by a player in a game: 34 attempts: Julius Jones, at Carolina Panthers, December 24, 2005
- Highest rushing per carry (minimum 10 attempts) in a game: 12.6: Brad Hubbert, vs. New York Jets, December 24, 1967
- Lowest rushing per carry (minimum 10 attempts) in a game: 0.6: Chris Warren, at Kansas City Chiefs, December 24, 1995
- Most receiving yards by a player in a game: (105 times, Over 100 receiving yards)
  - 265 receiving yards: Amari Cooper, at Houston Texans, December 24, 2023
  - 210 receiving yards: Isaac Bruce, vs. Miami Dolphins, December 24, 1995
  - 202 receiving yards: Adam Thielen, at Green Bay Packers, December 24, 2016
  - 200 receiving yards: Torrance Small, at Denver Broncos, December 24, 1994
  - 171 receiving yards: Doug Baldwin, vs. Arizona Cardinals, December 24, 2016
  - 169 receiving yards: Jared Cook, vs. Jacksonville Jaguars, December 24, 2011
  - 165 receiving yards: Charles Johnson, at San Diego Chargers, December 24, 1994
  - 164 receiving yards: Victor Cruz, at New York Jets, December 24, 2011
  - 163 receiving yards: Torry Holt, vs. San Francisco 49ers, December 24, 2005
  - 163 receiving yards: Paul Costa, at Oakland Raiders, December 24, 1967
  - 162 receiving yards: Donald Driver, at Minnesota Vikings, December 24, 2004
  - 160 receiving yards: Santana Moss, vs. New York Giants, December 24, 2005
  - 158 receiving yards: Todd Gurley, at Tennessee Titans, December 24, 2017
  - 154 receiving yards: Jordy Nelson, vs. Minnesota Vikings, December 24, 2016
  - 154 receiving yards: Sammy Watkins, vs. Miami Dolphins, December 24, 2016
  - 153 receiving yards: Jerry Rice, at Atlanta Falcons, December 24, 1995
  - 149 receiving yards: Julio Jones, at New Orleans Saints, December 24, 2017
  - 148 receiving yards: Isaac Bruce, vs. Washington Redskins, December 24, 2006
  - 147 receiving yards: Allen Robinson, vs. Tennessee Titans, December 24, 2016
  - 147 receiving yards: Dedric Ward, at Baltimore Ravens, December 24, 2000
  - 144 receiving yards: Bob Hayes, vs. Cleveland Browns, December 24, 1967
  - 143 receiving yards: Brandon Marshall, at New England Patriots, December 24, 2011
  - 141 receiving yards: Justin Jefferson, vs. Detroit Lions, December 24, 2023
  - 141 receiving yards: Don Maynard, at San Diego Chargers, December 24, 1967
  - 139 receiving yards: Richie Anderson, at Baltimore Ravens, December 24, 2000
  - 138 receiving yards: Wes Welker, vs. Miami Dolphins, December 24, 2011
  - 137 receiving yards: Robert Brooks, vs. Pittsburgh Steelers, December 24, 1995
  - 137 receiving yards: Louis Lipps, at Tampa Bay Buccaneers, December 24, 1989
  - 136 receiving yards: Bert Emanuel, vs. Arizona Cardinals, December 24, 1994
  - 136 receiving yards: Tom Fears, at Cleveland Browns, December 24, 1950 (1950 NFL Championship Game)
  - 135 receiving yards: Cameron Meredith, vs. Washington Redskins, December 24, 2016
  - 135 receiving yards: Carl Pickens, vs. Philadelphia Eagles, December 24, 1994
  - 135 receiving yards: Richard Johnson, at Atlanta Falcons, December 24, 1989
  - 135 receiving yards: Wallace Francis, vs. Philadelphia Eagles, December 24, 1978
  - 133 receiving yards: Justin Jefferson, vs. New York Giants, December 24, 2022
  - 132 receiving yards: J. J. Nelson, at Seattle Seahawks, December 24, 2016
  - 132 receiving yards: Sterling Sharpe, at Tampa Bay Buccaneers, December 24, 1994
  - 130 receiving yards: Brandon LaFell, at Houston Texans, December 24, 2016
  - 130 receiving yards: Michael Jackson, at Jacksonville Jaguars, December 24, 1995
  - 128 receiving yards: Tee Higgins, at New England Patriots, December 24, 2022
  - 128 receiving yards: Jason Tucker, at New Orleans Saints, December 24, 1999
  - 127 receiving yards: Tim Brown, vs. Denver Broncos, December 24, 1995
  - 125 receiving yards: Mervyn Fernandez, at New York Giants, December 24, 1989
  - 123 receiving yards: Webster Slaughter, vs. New York Jets, December 24, 1994
  - 123 receiving yards: Dave Kocourek, vs. Houston Oilers, December 24, 1961
  - 122 receiving yards: Brandon Stokley, at Seattle Seahawks, December 24, 2005
  - 122 receiving yards: Calvin Williams, at Cincinnati Bengals, December 24, 1994
  - 121 receiving yards: Torry Holt, at New Orleans Saints, December 24, 2000
  - 120 receiving yards: George Kittle, vs. Washington Commanders, December 24, 2022
  - 120 receiving yards: CeeDee Lamb, vs. Philadelphia Eagles, December 24, 2022
  - 119 receiving yards: Larry Fitzgerald, vs. New York Giants, December 24, 2017
  - 119 receiving yards: Andre Johnson, vs. Jacksonville Jaguars, December 24, 2005
  - 118 receiving yards: CeeDee Lamb, at Miami Dolphins, December 24, 2023
  - 118 receiving yards: Ernest Wilford, at Houston Texans, December 24, 2005
  - 118 receiving yards: George Sauer, at San Diego Chargers, December 24, 1967
  - 117 receiving yards: Chad Johnson, vs. Buffalo Bills, December 24, 2005
  - 115 receiving yards: Vincent Brisby, at Chicago Bears, December 24, 1994
  - 115 receiving yards: Gary Garrison, vs. New York Jets, December 24, 1967
  - 114 receiving yards: DeSean Jackson, at Chicago Bears, December 24, 2016
  - 114 receiving yards: Muhsin Muhammad, at Oakland Raiders, December 24, 2000
  - 113 receiving yards: Travis Kelce, vs. Seattle Seahawks, December 24, 2022
  - 113 receiving yards: DeVonta Smith, at Dallas Cowboys, December 24, 2022
  - 113 receiving yards: Jeff Graham, vs. Pittsburgh Steelers, December 24, 2000
  - 113 receiving yards: Cliff Branch, at Baltimore Colts, December 24, 1977
  - 112 receiving yards: Marvin Harrison, at Houston Texans, December 24, 2006
  - 112 receiving yards: Mike Barber, at Miami Dolphins, December 24, 1978
  - 111 receiving yards: Roy Williams, at New Orleans Saints, December 24, 2005
  - 111 receiving yards: Jake Reed, at Cincinnati Bengals, December 24, 1995
  - 111 receiving yards: Don Beebe, at Indianapolis Colts, December 24, 1994
  - 111 receiving yards: Henry Ellard, at New England Patriots, December 24, 1989
  - 110 receiving yards: Ashley Lelie, vs. Oakland Raiders, December 24, 2005
  - 110 receiving yards: Nate Burleson, vs. Green Bay Packers, December 24, 2004
  - 109 receiving yards: T. J. Hockenson, vs. New York Giants, December 24, 2022
  - 109 receiving yards: Tyreek Hill, vs. Miami Dolphins, December 24, 2017
  - 109 receiving yards: Marvin Harrison, vs. Minnesota Vikings, December 24, 2000
  - 108 receiving yards: D. J. Chark, at Carolina Panthers, December 24, 2022
  - 108 receiving yards: Keelan Cole, at San Francisco 49ers, December 24, 2017
  - 108 receiving yards: Mark Clayton, at Pittsburgh Steelers, December 24, 2006
  - 108 receiving yards: Hart Lee Dykes, vs. Los Angeles Rams, December 24, 1989
  - 108 receiving yards: Charlie Smith, at Atlanta Falcons, December 24, 1978
  - 107 receiving yards: Cole Kmet, vs. Arizona Cardinals, December 24, 2023
  - 107 receiving yards: Jakeem Grant, at Kansas City Chiefs, December 24, 2017
  - 107 receiving yards: Mike Evans, at Carolina Panthers, December 24, 2017
  - 107 receiving yards: Mike Furrey, vs. Chicago Bears, December 24, 2006
  - 107 receiving yards: Lee Evans, at Cincinnati Bengals, December 24, 2005
  - 106 receiving yards: Amon-Ra St. Brown, at Minnesota Vikings, December 24, 2023
  - 106 receiving yards: J. J. Stokes, at Atlanta Falcons, December 24, 1995
  - 105 receiving yards: T. Y. Hilton, at Oakland Raiders, December 24, 2016
  - 105 receiving yards: Larry Fitzgerald, at Cincinnati Bengals, December 24, 2011
  - 105 receiving yards: Hines Ward, at Cleveland Browns, December 24, 2005
  - 104 receiving yards: Ricky Proehl, vs. Carolina Panthers, December 24, 2005
  - 103 receiving yards: A. J. Brown, at Dallas Cowboys, December 24, 2022
  - 103 receiving yards: Brandon LaFell, vs. Tampa Bay Buccaneers, December 24, 2011
  - 103 receiving yards: Ken Burrough, at Miami Dolphins, December 24, 1978
  - 102 receiving yards: Calvin Johnson, vs. San Diego Chargers, December 24, 2011
  - 102 receiving yards: Steven Jackson, vs. Washington Redskins, December 24, 2006
  - 102 receiving yards: Troy Brown, vs. Miami Dolphins, December 24, 2000
  - 102 receiving yards: Mark Clayton, vs. Kansas City Chiefs, December 24, 1989
  - 101 receiving yards: Brandon Jones, at Buffalo Bills, December 24, 2006
  - 101 receiving yards: Corey Bradford, vs. Jacksonville Jaguars, December 24, 2005
  - 101 receiving yards: Mark Carrier, at Washington Redskins, December 24, 1995
  - 101 receiving yards: Mark Carrier, vs. Pittsburgh Steelers, December 24, 1989
  - 101 receiving yards: Jerry Rice, vs. Chicago Bears, December 24, 1989
  - 100 receiving yards: Kendrick Bourne, vs. Cincinnati Bengals, December 24, 2022
- Most receiving yards by a player in one half: 173 receiving yards: Amari Cooper, at Houston Texans, December 24, 2023 (1st half)
- Most receiving yards by a player in one quarter: 128 receiving yards: Victor Cruz, at New York Jets, December 24, 2011 (2nd quarter)
- Longest pass completion: 99 yards: Eli Manning to Victor Cruz, at New York Jets, December 24, 2011 (Tied NFL Records)
- Longest runs scrimmage: 80 yards: Brad Hubbert, vs. New York Jets, December 24, 1967
- Highest reception per reception (minimum 3 receptions) in a game: 54.7: Victor Cruz, at New York Jets, December 24, 2011
- Lowest reception per reception (minimum 3 receptions) in a game: -1.7: Javonte Williams, vs. New England Patriots, December 24, 2023
- Most reception in a game: 15 reception: Isaac Bruce, vs. Miami Dolphins, December 24, 1995
- Most field goals in a game: 5 field goals: Rian Lindell, vs. Tennessee Titans, December 24, 2006
- Most field goals in one half: 4 field goals: Rian Lindell, vs. Tennessee Titans, December 24, 2006 (1st half)
- Most field goals in one quarter: 3 field goals: Rian Lindell, vs. Tennessee Titans, December 24, 2006 (2nd quarter)
- Most field goals by both teams in a game: 8 field goals: Tennessee Titans (3) at Buffalo Bills (5), December 24, 2006
- Most field goals by both teams in one half: 6 field goals: Tennessee Titans (2) at Buffalo Bills (4), December 24, 2006 (1st half)
- Most field goals by both teams in one quarter: 5 field goals: Tennessee Titans (2) at Buffalo Bills (3), December 24, 2006 (2nd quarter)
- Most field goals 50 or longer made in a game:
  - 3 field goals: Jason Sanders, vs. Dallas Cowboys, December 24, 2023
  - 2 field goals: Dan Bailey, vs. Seattle Seahawks, December 24, 2017
  - 2 field goals: Matt Bryant, at Carolina Panthers, December 24, 2016
  - 2 field goals: Jason Myers, vs. Tennessee Titans, December 24, 2016
  - 2 field goals: Rob Bironas, vs. Jacksonville Jaguars, December 24, 2011
  - 2 field goals: Jeff Wilkins, vs. San Francisco 49ers, December 24, 2005
  - 2 field goals: Paul Edinger, at Detroit Lions, December 24, 2000
  - 2 field goals: Morten Andersen, vs. San Francisco 49ers, December 24, 1995
- Longest field goal:
  - 61 yards: Greg Joseph, vs. New York Giants, December 24, 2022
  - 59 yards: Morten Andersen, vs. San Francisco 49ers, December 24, 1995
- Most extra points made in a game: (2 times)
  - 7 made: Sebastian Janikowski, vs. Carolina Panthers, December 24, 2000
  - 7 made: Danny Villanueva, vs. Cleveland Browns, December 24, 1967
- Most extra points attempts in a game: (2 times)
  - 7 attempts: Sebastian Janikowski, vs. Carolina Panthers, December 24, 2000
  - 7 attempts: Danny Villanueva, vs. Cleveland Browns, December 24, 1967
- Most touchdowns by a player in a game: (10 times)
  - 3 touchdowns: Shane Zylstra, at Carolina Panthers, December 24, 2022
  - 3 touchdowns: David Johnson, at Seattle Seahawks, December 24, 2016
  - 3 touchdowns: Santana Moss, vs. New York Giants, December 24, 2005
  - 3 touchdowns: Shaun Alexander, vs. Indianapolis Colts, December 24, 2005
  - 3 touchdowns: LaBrandon Toefield, at Houston Texans, December 24, 2005
  - 3 touchdowns: Marshall Faulk, at New Orleans Saints, December 24, 2000
  - 3 touchdowns: Marvin Harrison, vs. Minnesota Vikings, December 24, 2000
  - 3 touchdowns: Sterling Sharpe, at Tampa Bay Buccaneers, December 24, 1994
  - 3 touchdowns: Barry Sanders, at Atlanta Falcons, December 24, 1989
  - 3 touchdowns: Don Maynard, at San Diego Chargers, December 24, 1967
- Most touchdowns by a player in one half: 3 touchdowns: Sterling Sharpe, at Tampa Bay Buccaneers, December 24, 1994 (1st half)
- Most touchdowns by a player in one quarter: (12 times)
  - 2 touchdowns: Mike Evans, vs. Jacksonville Jaguars, December 24, 2023 (2nd quarter)
  - 2 touchdowns: D. J. Chark, vs. Green Bay Packers, December 24, 2023 (4th quarter)
  - 2 touchdowns: George Kittle, vs. Washington Commanders, December 24, 2022 (3rd quarter)
  - 2 touchdowns: Dion Lewis, vs. Buffalo Bills, December 24, 2017 (4th quarter)
  - 2 touchdowns: David Johnson, at Seattle Seahawks, December 24, 2016 (4th quarter)
  - 2 touchdowns: Chris Thompson, at Chicago Bears, December 24, 2016 (1st quarter)
  - 2 touchdowns: DeAndré Washington, vs. Indianapolis Colts, December 24, 2016 (3rd quarter)
  - 2 touchdowns: Ron Dayne, vs. Indianapolis Colts, December 24, 2006 (1st quarter)
  - 2 touchdowns: Santana Moss, vs. New York Giants, December 24, 2005 (1st quarter)
  - 2 touchdowns: Chris Chambers, vs. Tennessee Titans, December 24, 2005 (2nd quarter)
  - 2 touchdowns: Sterling Sharpe, at Tampa Bay Buccaneers, December 24, 1994 (2nd quarter)
  - 2 touchdowns: Brad Hubbert, vs. New York Jets, December 24, 1967 (2nd quarter)
- Most rushing touchdowns by a player in a game: (3 times)
  - 3 touchdowns: David Johnson, at Seattle Seahawks, December 24, 2016
  - 3 touchdowns: LaBrandon Toefield, at Houston Texans, December 24, 2005
  - 3 touchdowns: Barry Sanders, at Atlanta Falcons, December 24, 1989
- Most rushing touchdowns by a player in one quarter: 2 touchdowns: Brad Hubbert, vs. New York Jets, December 24, 1967 (2nd quarter)
- Most receiving touchdowns in a game: (5 times)
  - 3 touchdowns: Shane Zylstra, at Carolina Panthers, December 24, 2022
  - 3 touchdowns: Santana Moss, vs. New York Giants, December 24, 2005
  - 3 touchdowns: Marvin Harrison, vs. Minnesota Vikings, December 24, 2000
  - 3 touchdowns: Sterling Sharpe, at Tampa Bay Buccaneers, December 24, 1994
  - 3 touchdowns: Don Maynard, at San Diego Chargers, December 24, 1967
- Most receiving touchdowns in one half: 3 touchdowns: Sterling Sharpe, at Tampa Bay Buccaneers, December 24, 1994 (1st half)
- Most punts in a game: 12 punts: David Lee, vs. Oakland Raiders, December 24, 1977
- Most punts by both teams in a game: 18 punts: New York Jets (9) vs. New York Giants (9), December 24, 2011
- Highest punting average (minimum 4 punts) in a game: 59.0: Shane Lechler, at Denver Broncos, December 24, 2005
- Longest kick return: 103 yards: Damiere Byrd, vs. Tampa Bay Buccaneers, December 24, 2017
- Longest punt return: 99 yards: Dwayne Harris vs. Denver Broncos, December 24, 2018 (2nd longest punt return in history behind Robert Bailey 103 yards in 1994)
- Longest interception return: 98 yards: Chris McAlister, vs. New York Jets, December 24, 2000
- Most interception by a player in a game: (24 times)
  - 2 interception: Kerby Joseph, at Minnesota Vikings, December 24, 2023
  - 2 interception: Antoine Bethea, vs. New York Giants, December 24, 2017
  - 2 interception: Ross Cockrell, at Arizona Cardinals, December 24, 2017
  - 2 interception: Jairus Byrd, vs. Tampa Bay Buccaneers, December 24, 2016
  - 2 interception: Malcolm Butler, vs. New York Jets, December 24, 2016
  - 2 interception: Bashaud Breeland, at Chicago Bears, December 24, 2016
  - 2 interception: Josh Norman, at Chicago Bears, December 24, 2016
  - 2 interception: Clinton Hart, at Seattle Seahawks, December 24, 2006
  - 2 interception: Jermaine Phillips, at Cleveland Browns, December 24, 2006
  - 2 interception: Rodney Harrison, vs. Pittsburgh Steelers, December 24, 2000
  - 2 interception: Duane Starks, vs. New York Jets, December 24, 2000
  - 2 interception: Aeneas Williams, at Washington Redskins, December 24, 2000
  - 2 interception: Carl Lee, at Denver Broncos, December 24, 1994
  - 2 interception: Fred Strickland, at New England Patriots, December 24, 1989
  - 2 interception: Felix Wright, vs. Houston Oilers, December 24, 1988
  - 2 interception: Bruce Laird, vs. Oakland Raiders, December 24, 1977
  - 2 interception: Tom Jackson, vs. Pittsburgh Steelers, December 24, 1977
  - 2 interception: Dick Anderson, vs. Cleveland Browns, December 24, 1972
  - 2 interception: Doug Swift, vs. Cleveland Browns, December 24, 1972
  - 2 interception: Warren Powers, vs. Buffalo Bills, December 24, 1967
  - 2 interception: Bud Whitehead, vs. Houston Oilers, December 24, 1961
  - 2 interception: Bob Zeman, vs. Houston Oilers, December 24, 1961
  - 2 interception: Charlie McNeil, vs. Houston Oilers, December 24, 1961
  - 2 interception: Warren Lahr, vs. Los Angeles Rams, December 24, 1950
- Most pass defended in a game: 6 pass defended: Kyle Fuller, vs. Cleveland Browns, December 24, 2017
- Most kickoff return touchdowns in a game: (8 times)
  - 1 touchdowns: Dameon Pierce, vs. Cleveland Browns, December 24, 2023
  - 1 touchdowns: Damiere Byrd, vs. Tampa Bay Buccaneers, December 24, 2017
  - 1 touchdowns: Terrence McGee, at Cincinnati Bengals, December 24, 2005
  - 1 touchdowns: Will Blackwell, at San Diego Chargers, December 24, 2000
  - 1 touchdowns: Tamarick Vanover, vs. Seattle Seahawks, December 24, 1995 (First play)
  - 1 touchdowns: Herschel Walker, at Cincinnati Bengals, December 24, 1994
  - 1 touchdowns: Andre Coleman, vs. Pittsburgh Steelers, December 24, 1994
  - 1 touchdowns: Marshall Johnson, vs. Oakland Raiders, December 24, 1977
- Most punt return touchdowns in a game:
  - 2 touchdowns: Jermaine Lewis, vs. New York Jets, December 24, 2000 (Tied NFL records)
  - 1 touchdowns: Dwayne Harris, vs. Denver Broncos, December 24, 2018
  - 1 touchdowns: Leodis McKelvin, vs. Denver Broncos, December 24, 2011
  - 1 touchdowns: Josh Cribbs, at Baltimore Ravens, December 24, 2011
  - 1 touchdowns: Brian Mitchell, at Los Angeles Rams, December 24, 1994
  - 1 touchdowns: Dave Meggett, vs. Los Angeles Raiders, December 24, 1989
- Most interception return for a touchdowns in a game: (19 times)
  - 1 touchdowns: Josh Sweat, at Dallas Cowboys, December 24, 2022
  - 1 touchdowns: Marcus Jones, vs. Cincinnati Bengals, December 24, 2022
  - 1 touchdowns: Dontae Johnson, vs. Jacksonville Jaguars, December 24, 2017
  - 1 touchdowns: Justin Coleman, at Dallas Cowboys, December 24, 2017
  - 1 touchdowns: Jordan Poyer, at New England Patriots, December 24, 2017
  - 1 touchdowns: Jalen Ramsey, vs. Tennessee Titans, December 24, 2016
  - 1 touchdowns: Cliff Avril, vs. San Diego Chargers, December 24, 2011
  - 1 touchdowns: Jairus Byrd, vs. Denver Broncos, December 24, 2011
  - 1 touchdowns: Derrick Brooks, at Cleveland Browns, December 24, 2006
  - 1 touchdowns: Chase Blackburn, at Washington Redskins, December 24, 2005
  - 1 touchdowns: Terrence McGee, at Cincinnati Bengals, December 24, 2005
  - 1 touchdowns: Karlos Dansby, vs. Philadelphia Eagles, December 24, 2005
  - 1 touchdowns: Chris Claiborne, vs. Green Bay Packers, December 24, 2004
  - 1 touchdowns: Rodney Harrison, vs. Pittsburgh Steelers, December 24, 2000
  - 1 touchdowns: R. W. McQuarters, at Detroit Lions, December 24, 2000
  - 1 touchdowns: Eric Allen, vs. Carolina Panthers, December 24, 2000
  - 1 touchdowns: Darrin Smith, vs. St. Louis Rams, December 24, 2000
  - 1 touchdowns: Chris McAlister, vs. New York Jets, December 24, 2000
  - 1 touchdowns: Bruce Laird, vs. Oakland Raiders, December 24, 1977
- Most fumble recovery for a touchdowns in a game: (12 times)
  - 1 touchdowns: Cody Davis, at Denver Broncos, December 24, 2023
  - 1 touchdowns: Rex Burkhead, at Tennessee Titans, December 24, 2022
  - 1 touchdowns: Wesley Woodyard, vs. Los Angeles Rams, December 24, 2017
  - 1 touchdowns: Robert Nkemdiche, vs. New York Giants, December 24, 2017
  - 1 touchdowns: Spencer Johnson, vs. Denver Broncos, December 24, 2011
  - 1 touchdowns: Daven Holly, vs. Tampa Bay Buccaneers, December 24, 2006
  - 1 touchdowns: Shaun Rogers, vs. New Orleans Saints, December 24, 2005
  - 1 touchdowns: Darrien Gordon, vs. Carolina Panthers, December 24, 2000
  - 1 touchdowns: Fred Weary, vs. Dallas Cowboys, December 24, 1999
  - 1 touchdowns: Jerome Henderson, at Chicago Bears, December 24, 1995
  - 1 touchdowns: Jerry Rice, at Atlanta Falcons, December 24, 1995
  - 1 touchdowns: Larry Brink, at Cleveland Browns, December 24, 1950
- Most non-offensive touchdowns by a player in a game: (2 times)
  - 2 touchdowns: Terrence McGee, at Cincinnati Bengals, December 24, 2005
  - 2 touchdowns: Jermaine Lewis, vs. New York Jets, December 24, 2000
- Highest passing rating (minimum 20 attempts) in a game: 155.8 passing rating: Jim Everett, at Denver Broncos, December 24, 1994
- Lowest passing rating (minimum 20 attempts) in a game: 1.7 passing rating: Sam Howell, at New York Jets, December 24, 2023
- Highest completion percentage (minimum 20 attempts) in a game: 85.2%: Jim Everett, at Denver Broncos, December 24, 1994
- Lowest completion percentage (minimum 20 attempts) in a game: (2 times)
  - 27.2%: Sam Howell, at New York Jets, December 24, 2023
  - 27.2%: Jack Kemp, at Oakland Raiders, December 24, 1967
- Highest passing yards per attempts (minimum 20 attempts) in a game: 13.6: Jameis Winston, at Carolina Panthers, December 24, 2017
- Lowest passing yards per attempts (minimum 20 attempts) in a game: 2.5: Sam Howell, at New York Jets, December 24, 2023
- Most total yards by one team in a game: 570 total yards: Carolina Panthers vs. Detroit Lions, December 24, 2022
- Most total yards by one team in one half: 364 total yards: Carolina Panthers vs. Detroit Lions, December 24, 2022 (1st half)
- Most total yards by one team in one quarter: 251 total yards: Carolina Panthers vs. Detroit Lions, December 24, 2022 (2nd quarter)
- Fewest total yards by one team in a game: 152 total yards: Baltimore Ravens vs. New York Jets, December 24, 2000
- Fewest total yards by one team in one half: 30 total yards: Cleveland Browns vs. Pittsburgh Steelers, December 24, 2005 (1st half)
- Fewest total yards by one team in one quarter: -13 total yards: Denver Broncos vs. New England Patriots, December 24, 2023 (3rd quarter)
- Fewest total yards by both teams in a game: 371 total yards: Carolina Panthers (194) at Atlanta Falcons (177), December 24, 2006
- Fewest total yards by both teams in one half: 139 total yards: Carolina Panthers (63) at Atlanta Falcons (76), December 24, 2006 (2nd half)
- Fewest total yards by both teams in one quarter: 26 total yards: Seattle Seahawks (1) vs. Arizona Cardinals (25), December 24, 2016 (1st quarter)
- Games ended NFL Scorigami: (2 times)
  - Jacksonville Jaguars (33) at San Francisco 49ers (44), December 24, 2017
  - New England Patriots (18) vs. Cincinnati Bengals (22), December 24, 2022
- Most safety scored in a game: (8 times)
  - 1 safety: Denico Autry, vs. San Diego Chargers, December 24, 2015
  - 1 safety: Chris Canty, at New York Jets, December 24, 2011
  - 1 safety: Michael McCrary, vs. New York Jets, December 24, 2000
  - 1 safety: Anthony Cook, at Buffalo Bills, December 24, 1995
  - 1 safety: New York Giants vs. Dallas Cowboys, December 24, 1994
  - 1 safety: Kansas City Chiefs at Los Angeles Raiders, December 24, 1994
  - 1 safety: Sherman Cocroft, vs. Pittsburgh Steelers, December 24, 1989
  - 1 safety: Miami Dolphins vs. Houston Oilers, December 24, 1978
- Successful onside kick recovery: Jacksonville Jaguars at San Francisco 49ers, December 24, 2017
- Most games played by NFL head coaches: 9 games: Bill Belichick, 1991-1995, 2000-2023
- Most wins by NFL head coaches: 6 wins: Bill Belichick, 1991-1995, 2000-2023
- Most losses by NFL head coaches: 3 losses: Bill Belichick, 1991-1995, 2000-2023
- Oldest NFL player to play NFL Christmas Eve: 46 years and 127 days: Morten Andersen, vs. Carolina Panthers, December 24, 2006
- Youngest NFL player to play NFL Christmas Eve: 20 years and 344 days: Kevin Jefferson, vs, Philadelphia Eagles, December 24, 1994
- Most fumbles forced by a player in a game: 3 fumbles: DeMarcus Ware, at Carolina Panthers, December 24, 2005
- Most fumbles recovered in a game: 3 fumbles: Kyle Turley, at St. Louis Rams, December 24, 2000
- Most fumbles by a player in a game:
  - 4 fumbles: Charlie Frye, vs. Pittsburgh Steelers, December 24, 2005
  - 3 fumbles: Jameis Winston, at Carolina Panthers, December 24, 2017
  - 3 fumbles: Matt Moore, at New England Patriots, December 24, 2011
  - 3 fumbles: Jake Delhomme, vs. Dallas Cowboys, December 24, 2005
  - 3 fumbles: Gus Frerotte, vs. Tennessee Titans, December 24, 2005
- Most kick return by a player in a game: (3 times)
  - 7 return: Matt Willis, at Buffalo Bills, December 24, 2011
  - 7 return: Willie Ponder, vs. Washington Redskins, December 24, 2006
  - 7 return: Tab Perry, vs. Buffalo Bills, December 24, 2005
- Most kick return yards by a player in a game: 220 kick return yards: Terrence McGee, at Cincinnati Bengals, December 24, 2005
- Highest kick return average (minimum 3 returns) in a game: 49.7: Bryan McCann, at Kansas City Chiefs, December 24, 2011
- Most punt return by a player in a game: 9 return: Reggie Swinton vs. Philadelphia Eagles, December 24, 2005
- Most punt return yards by a player in a game: 173 punt return yards: Jermaine Lewis, vs. New York Jets, December 24, 2000
- Highest punt return average (minimum 3 returns) in a game: 45.0: Leodis McKelvin, vs. Denver Broncos, December 24, 2011
- Most times sacked by a quarterback in a game:
  - 8 sacks: Charlie Frye, vs. Pittsburgh Steelers, December 24, 2005
  - 7 sacks: Robert Griffin III, vs. San Diego Chargers, December 24, 2016
- Most sacks by a defensive player in a game: 3.5 sacks: Shawne Merriman, at Seattle Seahawks, December 24, 2006
- Most blocked kicks in a game: (2 times)
  - 2 blocked kicks: Richard Seymour, at Kansas City Chiefs, December 24, 2011
  - 2 blocked kicks: Shane Dronett, vs. New Orleans Saints, December 24, 1994
- Most blocked field goal in a game:
  - 2 blocked kicks: Richard Seymour, at Kansas City Chiefs, December 24, 2011
  - 2 blocked kicks: Shane Dronett, vs. New Orleans Saints, December 24, 1994
  - 1 blocked kicks: Ade Ogundeji, at Baltimore Ravens, December 24, 2022
  - 1 blocked kicks: Preston Smith, at Chicago Bears, December 24, 2016
  - 1 blocked kicks: Vernon Butler, vs. Atlanta Falcons, December 24, 2016
  - 1 blocked kicks: Rodney Gunter, at Seattle Seahawks, December 24, 2016
  - 1 blocked kicks: Jamie Meder, vs. San Diego Chargers, December 24, 2016
  - 1 blocked kicks: Jeb Terry, at Cleveland Browns, December 24, 2006
  - 1 blocked kicks: Julius Peppers, vs. Dallas Cowboys, December 24, 2005
  - 1 blocked kicks: Renaldo Wynn, vs. New York Giants, December 24, 2005
  - 1 blocked kicks: Dewayne White, vs. Atlanta Falcons, December 24, 2005
  - 1 blocked kicks: Michael Boulware, vs. Indianapolis Colts, December 24, 2005
  - 1 blocked kicks: Troy Barnett at Chicago Bears, December 24, 1994
- Most blocked extra point in a game: (7 times)
  - 1 blocked kicks: Theo Jackson, vs. Detroit Lions, December 24, 2023
  - 1 blocked kicks: Carl Nassib, at Chicago Bears, December 24, 2017
  - 1 blocked kicks: William Gholston, at Carolina Panthers, December 24, 2017
  - 1 blocked kicks: Jalen Myrick, at San Francisco 49ers, December 24, 2017
  - 1 blocked kicks: Hassan Ridgeway, at Oakland Raiders, December 24, 2016
  - 1 blocked kicks: Margus Hunt, at Houston Texans, December 24, 2016
  - 1 blocked kicks: Sean Jones, vs. Tampa Bay Buccaneers, December 24, 2006
- Most blocked punts in a game: (7 times)
  - 1 blocked kicks: Josh Metellus, vs. New York Giants, December 24, 2022
  - 1 blocked kicks: Heath Farwell, vs. San Francisco 49ers, December 24, 2011
  - 1 blocked kicks: Vernon Fox, at St. Louis Rams, December 24, 2006
  - 1 blocked kicks: Sherman Cocroft, vs. Pittsburgh Steelers, December 24, 1989
  - 1 blocked kicks: John Schultz, vs. Pittsburgh Steelers, December 24, 1977
  - 1 blocked kicks: Ted Hendricks, at Baltimore Colts, December 24, 1977
  - 1 blocked kicks: Charlie Babb, vs. Cleveland Browns, December 24, 1972
- Most blocked punt return for a touchdowns: 1 touchdowns: Charlie Babb, vs. Cleveland Browns, December 24, 1972
- Defensive two-point conversion: Aaron Colvin, at San Francisco 49ers, December 24, 2017
- Most points by one team in a game: (2 times)
  - 52 points: Dallas Cowboys vs. Cleveland Browns, December 24, 1967
  - 52 points: Oakland Raiders vs. Carolina Panthers, December 24, 2000
- Largest magrin victory in a game:
  - 43 points: Oakland Raiders (52) vs. Carolina Panthers (9), December 24, 2000
  - 41 points: Pittsburgh Steelers (41) at Cleveland Browns (0), December 24, 2005
  - 38 points: Dallas Cowboys (52) vs. Cleveland Browns (14), December 24, 1967
- Largest comeback in a game: 21 points: Cincinnati Bengals vs. Minnesota Vikings, December 24, 1995
- Most points by one team in first half: (3 times)
  - 28 points: New York Jets at San Diego Chargers, December 24, 1967
  - 28 points: Green Bay Packers at Tampa Bay Buccaneers, December 24, 1994
  - 28 points: Green Bay Packers vs. Minnesota Vikings, December 24, 2016
- Most points by one team in second half:
  - 31 points: New Orleans Saints vs. Indianapolis Colts, December 24, 1989
  - 30 points: San Francisco 49ers vs. Washington Commanders, December 24, 2022
  - 29 points: Buffalo Bills at Chicago Bears, December 24, 2022
- Most points by one team in first quarter: 17 points: New York Jets vs. Washington Commanders, December 24, 2023
- Most points by one team in second quarter:
  - 21 points: Kansas City Chiefs at Miami Dolphins, December 24, 1989
  - 21 points: Minnesota Vikings at Cincinnati Bengals, December 24, 1995
  - 21 points: Minnesota Vikings vs. Green Bay Packers, December 24, 2004
  - 20 points: Baltimore Ravens vs. New York Jets, December 24, 2000
- Most points by one team in third quarter:
  - 21 points: Dallas Cowboys vs. Cleveland Browns, December 24, 1967
  - 21 points: Carolina Panthers vs. Tampa Bay Buccaneers, December 24, 2011
  - 20 points: New England Patriots at Denver Broncos, December 24, 2023
- Most points by one team in fourth quarter: 24 points: New Orleans Saints vs. Indianapolis Colts, December 24, 1989
- Most points by both teams in a game:
  - 77 points: Jacksonville Jaguars (33) at San Francisco 49ers (44), December 24, 2017
  - 74 points: Dallas Cowboys (40) vs. Philadelphia Eagles (34), December 24, 2022
  - 73 points: New York Jets (42) at San Diego Chargers (31), December 24, 1967
  - 71 points: San Diego Chargers (37) vs. Pittsburgh Steelers (34), December 24, 1994
- Most points by both teams in first half: 52 points: New York Jets (28) at San Diego Chargers (24), December 24, 1967
- Most points by both teams in second half:
  - 48 points: Seattle Seahawks (28) vs. Arizona Cardinals (20), December 24, 2016
  - 45 points: Oakland Raiders (24) at Baltimore Colts (21), December 24, 1977
  - 45 points: Jacksonville Jaguars (17) at San Francisco 49ers (28), December 24, 2017
  - 43 points: San Francisco 49ers (30) vs. Washington Commanders (13), December 24, 2022
- Most points by both teams in first quarter: 24 points: Washington Redskins (14) vs. New York Giants (10), December 24, 2005
- Most points by both teams in second quarter:
  - 38 points: Minnesota Vikings (21) vs. Green Bay Packers (17), December 24, 2004
  - 31 points: New York Jets (14) at San Diego Chargers (17), December 24, 1967
  - 31 points: Washington Redskins (17) at Los Angeles Rams (14), December 24, 1994
- Most points by both teams in third quarter:
  - 29 points: New Orleans Saints (15) vs. Tampa Bay Buccaneers (14), December 24, 2016
  - 28 points: Buffalo Bills (14) vs. Miami Dolphins (14), December 24, 2016
- Most points by both teams in fourth quarter:
  - 41 points: Seattle Seahawks (21) vs. Arizona Cardinals (20), December 24, 2016
  - 35 points: Jacksonville Jaguars (14) at San Francisco 49ers (21), December 24, 2017
- Fewest points by both teams in a game: 12 points: New York Jets (0) vs. New Orleans Saints (12), December 24, 1995
- Most first downs by one team in a game 32 first downs: Jacksonville Jaguars at San Francisco 49ers, December 24, 2017
- Most first downs by both teams in a game 58 first downs: Jacksonville Jaguars (32) at San Francisco 49ers (26), December 24, 2017

=== NBA television games records ===
- Most points by one team in a game: 162 points: Syracuse Nationals vs. New York Knicks, December 25, 1960
- Most points by one team in first half: 78 points: Syracuse Nationals vs. New York Knicks, December 25, 1960
- Most points by one team in second half: 84 points: Syracuse Nationals vs. New York Knicks, December 25, 1960
- Most points by one team in first quarter: 42 points: Portland Trail Blazers vs. Los Angeles Lakers, December 25, 1983
- Most points by one team in second quarter: 43 points: Philadelphia 76ers vs. New York Knicks, December 25, 1968
- Most points by one team in third quarter: 51 points: Dallas Mavericks vs. Los Angeles Lakers, December 25, 2022
- Most points by one team in fourth quarter: 43 points: Phoenix Suns vs. Los Angeles Lakers, December 25, 1976
- Most points by one team in an overtime period: 27 points: Denver Nuggets vs. Minnesota Timberwolves, December 25, 2025 (NBA Records)
- Largest margin victory in a game: 62 points: Syracuse Nationals (162) vs. New York Knicks (100), December 25, 1960
- Most points by both teams in a game: 280 points: Denver Nuggets (142) vs. Minnesota Timberwolves (138), December 25, 2025 (OT)
- Most points by both teams in a regulation game: 268 points: Cincinnati Royals (127) at Los Angeles Lakers (141), December 25, 1961
- Most points by both teams in first half: 142 points: Portland Trail Blazers (72) vs. Los Angeles Lakers (70), December 25, 1983
- Most points by both teams in second half: 154 points: Cincinnati Royals (72) at Los Angeles Lakers (82), December 25, 1961
- Most points by both teams in first quarter: 77 points: San Antonio Spurs (41) at Oklahoma City Thunder (36), December 25, 2025
- Most points by both teams in second quarter: (2 times)
  - 75 points: Milwaukee Bucks (34) vs. Detroit Pistons (41), December 25, 1968
  - 75 points: Golden State Warriors (36) vs. Houston Rockets (39), December 25, 2019
- Most points by both teams in third quarter: 86 points: Cincinnati Royals (41) at Los Angeles Lakers (45), December 25, 1961
- Most points by both teams in fourth quarter: 76 points: Seattle SuperSonics (41) vs. Los Angeles Clippers (35), December 25, 1978
- Most points by both teams in an overtime period: 50 points: Denver Nuggets (27) vs. Minnesota Timberwolves (23), December 25, 2025 (NBA Records)
- Fewest points by one team in a game: 68 points: New Orleans Hornets at Orlando Magic, December 25, 2008
- Fewest points by one team in first half: (2 times)
  - 27 points: Rochester Royals vs. Fort Wayne Pistons, December 25, 1954
  - 27 points: Orlando Magic vs. Boston Celtics, December 25, 2009
- Fewest points by one team in second half: 27 points: Orlando Magic vs. New Orleans Hornets, December 25, 2008
- Fewest points by one team in first quarter: 8 points: San Antonio Spurs at Detroit Pistons, December 25, 2005
- Fewest points by one team in second quarter: 8 points: Orlando Magic vs. Boston Celtics, December 25, 2009
- Fewest points by one team in third quarter: 12 points: Chicago Bulls at Los Angeles Lakers, December 25, 2011
- Fewest points by one team in fourth quarter: 8 points: Miami Heat at Dallas Mavericks, December 25, 2011
- Fewest points by one team in overtime period: 4 points: Minneapolis Lakers vs. Detroit Pistons, December 25, 1958
- Fewest points by both teams in a game: 153 points: Rochester Royals (80) vs. Fort Wayne Pistons (73), December 25, 1954
- Fewest points by both teams in first half:
  - 65 points: Orlando Magic (27) vs. Boston Celtics (38), December 25, 2009
  - 66 points: Rochester Royals (27) vs. Fort Wayne Pistons (39), December 25, 1954
  - 66 points: Philadelphia Warriors (34) vs. Boston Celtics (32), December 25, 1956
- Fewest points by both teams in second half: 64 points: Orlando Magic (27) vs. New Orleans Hornets (37), December 25, 2008
- Fewest points by both teams in first quarter: 26 points: San Antonio Spurs (8) at Detroit Pistons (18), December 25, 2005
- Fewest points by both teams in second quarter: (2 times)
  - 28 points: Philadelphia Warriors (13) vs. Boston Celtics (15), December 25, 1956
  - 28 points: Orlando Magic (8) vs. Boston Celtics (20), December 25, 2009
- Fewest points by both teams in third quarter: (3 times)
  - 32 points: Los Angeles Lakers (18) at Los Angeles Clippers (14), December 25, 1991
  - 32 points: San Antonio Spurs (15) at Los Angeles Clippers (17), December 25, 1992
  - 32 points: Chicago Bulls (12) at Los Angeles Lakers (20), December 25, 2011
- Fewest points by both teams in fourth quarter: 27 points: Orlando Magic (14) vs. New Orleans Hornets (13), December 25, 2008
- Fewest points by both teams in overtime period: 9 points: Minneapolis Lakers (4) vs. Detroit Pistons (5), December 25, 1958
- Most games played NBA Christmas games: 58 games: New York Knicks
- Most wins NBA Christmas games: 26 wins: New York Knicks
- Most losses NBA Christmas games: 32 losses: New York Knicks
- Never played on NBA Christmas games: Charlotte Hornets
- Oldest player to played NBA Christmas Day:
  - 41 years and 253 days: Kareem Abdul-Jabbar, at Utah Jazz, December 25, 1988
  - 40 years and 360 days: LeBron James, vs. Houston Rockets, December 25, 2025
  - 40 years and 85 days: Kurt Thomas, at Los Angeles Lakers, December 25, 2012
- Youngest player to played NBA Christmas Day: 18 years and 125 days: Kobe Bryant, at Phoenix Suns, December 25, 1996
- Most games played by a player in a career: 20 games: LeBron James, 2003-present
- Most wins by a player in a career: 11 wins: LeBron James, 2003-present
- Most losses by a player in a career: 9 losses: LeBron James, 2003-present
- Most points by a player in a career: 506 points: LeBron James, 2003-present
- Most three-pointer made by a player in a career: 31 three-pointers: James Harden, 2009-2026
- Most rebounds by a player in a career: 176 rebounds: Bill Russell, 1956-1969
- Most assists by a player in a career: 145 assists: Oscar Robertson, 1960-1974
- Most steals by a player in a career: 29 steals: Russell Westbrook, 2008-2026
- Most blocks by a player in a career: 25 blocks: Shaquille O'Neal, 1992-2011
- Most NBA coaches wins in a career: 11 wins: Phil Jackson and Jack Ramsay
- Most points by a player in a game: (34 times, Over 40 points)
  - 60 points: Bernard King, vs. New Jersey Nets, December 25, 1984
  - 59 points: Wilt Chamberlain, at New York Knicks, December 25, 1961
  - 56 points: Nikola Jokić, vs. Minnesota Timberwolves, December 25, 2025
  - 50 points: Luka Dončić, at Phoenix Suns, December 25, 2023
  - 50 points: Rick Barry, at Cincinnati Royals, December 25, 1966
  - 47 points: Jerry West, at New York Knicks, December 25, 1963
  - 46 points: Tracy McGrady, vs. Detroit Pistons, December 25, 2002
  - 45 points: Dominique Wilkins, at Philadelphia 76ers, December 25, 1987
  - 45 points: Tom Heinsohn, at Syracuse Nationals, December 25, 1961
  - 45 points: Wilt Chamberlain, vs. Syracuse Nationals, December 25, 1959
  - 44 points: Anthony Edwards, at Denver Nuggets, December 25, 2025
  - 44 points: Kevin Durant, vs. Denver Nuggets, December 25, 2010
  - 44 points: Jerry West, vs. Detroit Pistons, December 25, 1965
  - 43 points: Tracy McGrady, at Indiana Pacers, December 25, 2000
  - 43 points: Don Ohl, vs. Detroit Pistons, December 25, 1966
  - 42 points: Victor Wembanyama, at New York Knicks, December 25, 2024
  - 42 points: Kobe Bryant, vs. Miami Heat, December 25, 2004
  - 42 points: Michael Jordan, vs. New York Knicks, December 25, 1992
  - 42 points: Bob Love, at Baltimore Bullets, December 25, 1970
  - 41 points: Mikal Bridges, vs. Sacramento Kings, December 25, 2024
  - 41 points: Nikola Jokić, vs. Phoenix Suns, December 25, 2022
  - 41 points: Jayson Tatum, vs. Milwaukee Bucks, December 25, 2022
  - 41 points: James Harden, vs. Oklahoma City Thunder, December 25, 2018
  - 41 points: Brandon Roy, vs. Denver Nuggets, December 25, 2009
  - 41 points: Tracy McGrady, vs. Cleveland Cavaliers, December 25, 2003
  - 41 points: Billy Cunningham, at Baltimore Bullets, December 25, 1969
  - 40 points: Anthony Davis, vs. Boston Celtics, December 25, 2023
  - 40 points: Kyrie Irving, at Philadelphia 76ers, December 25, 2018
  - 40 points: Dwyane Wade, vs. Los Angeles Lakers, December 25, 2006
  - 40 points: Walt Bellamy, vs. Buffalo Braves, December 25, 1971
  - 40 points: Bob Boozer, at New York Knicks, December 25, 1966
  - 40 points: Elgin Baylor, at Cincinnati Royals, December 25, 1961
  - 40 points: Oscar Robertson, vs. Los Angeles Lakers, December 25, 1961
  - 40 points: Richie Guerin, vs. Philadelphia Warriors, December 25, 1961
- Most points by a player in one half: 40 points: Bernard King, vs. New Jersey Nets, December 25, 1984 (1st half) (This NBA play by play only go back 1996-97 NBA season)
- Most rebounds by a player in a game: 36 rebounds: Wilt Chamberlain, at New York Knicks, December 25, 1961
- Most offensive rebounds by a player in a game: 11 rebounds: Enes Kanter Freedom, vs. Philadelphia 76ers, December 25, 2017
- Most defensive rebounds by a player in a game: (2 times)
  - 17 rebounds: Larry Bird, at New York Knicks, December 25, 1980
  - 17 rebounds: Dwight Howard, vs. Boston Celtics, December 25, 2009
- Most assists by a player in a game: (2 times)
  - 18 assists: Guy Rodgers, vs. Chicago Bulls, December 25, 1966
  - 18 assists: Nate Archibald, vs. Milwaukee Bucks, December 25, 1972
- Most steals by a player in a game: 7 steals: Kyrie Irving, December 25, 2016
- Most steals by a player in one half: 5 steals: Kyrie Irving, December 25, 2016 (2nd half)
- Most blocks by a player in a game: 8 blocks: DeAndre Jordan, December 25, 2011
- Most blocks by a player in one half: 5 blocks: DeAndre Jordan, December 25, 2011 (1st half)
- Most three-pointer by a player in a game: 9 three-pointers: Jamal Murray vs. Minnesota Timberwolves, December 25, 2025
- Most field goal made by a one team in an overtime period: 7 made: Minnesota Timberwolves at Denver Nuggets, December 25, 2025
- Most field goal made by a both teams in an overtime period: 12 made: Denver Nuggets (5) vs. Minnesota Timberwolves (7), December 25, 2025
- Fewest field goal attempts by one team in a game: 64 attempts: Brooklyn Nets vs. Boston Celtics, December 25, 2012
- Fewest field goal attempts by one team in one half: (2 times)
  - 29 attempts: Cleveland Cavaliers at Los Angeles Lakers, December 25, 2009 (2nd half)
  - 29 attempts: Brooklyn Nets vs. Boston Celtics, December 25, 2012 (2nd half)
- Fewest field goal attempts by one team in one quarter: 12 attempts: New York Knicks vs. Boston Celtics, December 25, 2011 (4th quarter)
- Fewest field goal attempts by both teams in a game: 141 attempts: Brooklyn Nets (64) vs. Boston Celtics (77), December 25, 2012
- Fewest field goal attempts by both teams in one half: 60 attempts: Brooklyn Nets (29) vs. Boston Celtics (31), December 25, 2012 (2nd half)
- Fewest field goal attempts by both teams in one quarter: 27 attempts: Brooklyn Nets (13) vs. Boston Celtics (14), December 25, 2012 (4th quarter)
- Most points by a player in an overtime period: 18 points: Nikola Jokić, vs. Minnesota Timberwolves, December 25, 2025 (NBA Records)
- Most assists by a player in an overtime period: 4 assists: Jamal Murray, vs. Minnesota Timberwolves, December 25, 2025
- Most free throw made by a player in an overtime period: 10 made: Nikola Jokić, vs. Minnesota Timberwolves, December 25, 2025
- Most free throw attempts by a player in an overtime period: 11 attempts: Nikola Jokić, vs. Minnesota Timberwolves, December 25, 2025
- Most field goal made by a player in an overtime period: 4 made: Anthony Edwards, at Denver Nuggets, December 25, 2025
- Most three-pointer made by a player in an overtime period: (2 times)
  - 2 three-pointer: Kyrie Irving, at Philadelphia 76ers, December 25, 2018
  - 2 three-pointer: Nikola Jokić, vs. Minnesota Timberwolves, December 25, 2025

=== Soccer television match records and statistics ===
- Player sent off on Christmas Day: (18 times)
  - Mohammed Al-Safri, Al Faisaly FC v Al Fateh SC, 25 December 2015 (90+4th minute)
  - Jorge Torres Nilo, Tigres UANL v Club América, 25 December 2016 (89th minute)
  - Rubens Sambueza, Club América v Tigres UANL, 25 December 2016 (101st minute)
  - Paolo Goltz, Club América v Tigres UANL, 25 December 2016 (103rd minute)
  - Pablo Aguilar, Club América v Tigres UANL, 25 December 2016 (103rd minute)
  - Ventura Alvarado, Club América v Tigres UANL, 25 December 2016 (104th minute)
  - José Arturo Rivas, Tigres UANL v Club América, 25 December 2016 (104th minute)
  - Dany Nounkeu, Kardemir Karabükspor v Kayserispor, 25 December 2016 (15th minute)
  - Erhan Kartal, Alanyaspor v Galatasaray S.K., 25 December 2016 (89th minute)
  - Ömer Bayram, Akhisarspor v Osmanlıspor, 25 December 2017 (63rd minute)
  - Madallah Al-Olayan, Al Taawoun FC v Al Raed S.FC, 25 December 2018 (34th minute)
  - Jorge Flores, Sport Boys Warnes v Club Bolívar, 25 December 2019 (64th minute)
  - Óscar Añez, Club Always Ready v The Strongest, 25 December 2019 (90+1st minute)
  - Ahmad Gohari, Naft Masjed Soleyman F.C. v Machine Sazi F.C., 25 December 2020 (90+7th minute)
  - Diego Hoyos, Club Deportivo Guabirá v Club Blooming, 25 December 2020 (41st minute)
  - Li Chao, Wuhan Yangtze River F.C. v Cangzhou Mighty Lions F.C., 25 December 2021 (12th minute)
  - Cebrail Karayel, Altay S.K. v Kasımpaşa S.K., 25 December 2021 (67th minute)
  - Mohammed Al-Khaibari, Al-Riyadh SC v Al-Ettifaq Club, 25 December 2025 (51st minute)
- International soccer matches played on Christmas Eve: (6 matches)
  - Iran v Palestine, 24 December 2018
  - Iraq v China, 24 December 2018
  - Burkina Faso v Equatorial Guinea, 24 December 2025 (2025 Africa Cup of Nations)
  - Algeria v Sudan, 24 December 2025
  - Ivory Coast v Mozambique, 24 December 2025
  - Cameroon v Gabon, 24 December 2025
- International soccer player sent off on Christmas Eve: (3 times)
  - Liu Yiming, v Iraq, 24 December 2018 (82nd minute)
  - Salah Adel, v Algeria, 24 December 2025 (39th minute)
  - Basilio Ndong, v Burkina Faso, 24 December 2025 (50th minute)
- International soccer matches played on Christmas Day: (5 matches)
  - Iraq v Uzbekistan, 25 December 2014
  - Jordan v Libya, 25 December 2017
  - Afghanistan v Turkmenistan, 25 December 2018
  - Vietnam v North Korea, 25 December 2018
  - Qatar v Kyrgyzstan, 25 December 2018
- International soccer goals scored on Christmas Day: (8 times)
  - Jamshid Iskanderov, v Iraq, 25 December 2014 (13th minute, Penalty)
  - Musa Al-Taamari, v Libya, 25 December 2017 (52nd minute)
  - Faisal Al Badri, v Jordan, 25 December 2017 (75th minute, Penalty)
  - Wahyt Orazsähedow, v Afghanistan, 25 December 2018 (48th minute)
  - Güýçmyrat Annagulyýew, v Afghanistan, 25 December 2018 (51st minute)
  - Nguyễn Tiến Linh, v North Korea, 25 December 2018 (54th minute)
  - Jong Il-gwan, v Vietnam, 25 December 2018 (81st minute)
  - Ali Afif, v Kyrgyzstan, 25 December 2018 (68th minute)
- Premier League goals scored on Christmas Eve: (3 times)
  - Mario Lemina, v Chelsea, 24 December 2023 (51st minute)
  - Matt Doherty, v Chelsea, 24 December 2023 (90+3rd minute)
  - Christopher Nkunku, v Wolverhampton Wanderers, 24 December 2023 (90+6th minute)
- Premier League yellow cards on Christmas Eve: (9 times)
  - Mario Lemina, v Chelsea, 24 December 2023 (27th minute)
  - Conor Gallagher, v Wolverhampton Wanderers, 24 December 2023 (30th minute)
  - Cole Palmer, v Wolverhampton Wanderers, 24 December 2023 (56th minute)
  - Malo Gusto, v Wolverhampton Wanderers, 24 December 2023 (60th minute)
  - Nicolas Jackson, v Wolverhampton Wanderers, 24 December 2023 (62nd minute)
  - Matheus Cunha, v Chelsea, 24 December 2023 (64th minute)
  - Raheem Sterling, v Wolverhampton Wanderers, 24 December 2023 (90+9th minute)
  - Hugo Bueno, v Chelsea, 24 December 2023 (90+10th minute)
  - Marcus Bettinelli, v Wolverhampton Wanderers, 24 December 2023 (90+11th minute)
- A-League Men goals scored on Christmas Eve: (3 times)
  - Bachana Arabuli v Sydney FC, 24 December 2022 (45+1st minute)
  - Ulises Dávila v Sydney FC, 24 December 2022 (71st minute)
  - Bachana Arabuli v Sydney FC, 24 December 2022 (89th minute)
- A-League Men player sent off on Christmas Eve: Joe Lolley v Macarthur FC, 24 December 2022 (56th minute)
- A-League Women goals scored on Christmas Eve: (2 times)
  - Mackenzie Hawkesby v Western Sydney Wanderers, 24 December 2022 (30th minute)
  - Cortnee Vine v Western Sydney Wanderers, 24 December 2022 (34th minute)
- First Christmas Day goal: Jamshid Iskanderov, Uzbekistan v Iraq, 25 December 2014 (13th minute)
- Penalty kick missed: Ali Bahjat, Iraq v Uzbekistan, 25 December 2014 (32nd minute)
- Most penalty goals by a player in a match: 2 goals: Amir Hadžiahmetović, Konyaspor v Alanyaspor, 25 December 2022
- Biggest wins: 4 goals: Club Always Ready v C.D. Palmaflor del Trópico, 25 December 2020
- Most goals by one team in a match: 5 goals: Galatasaray S.K. v Alanyaspor, 25 December 2016
- Most goals by one team in first half: 4 goals: Club Always Ready v C.D. Palmaflor del Trópico, 25 December 2020
- Most goals by both teams in a match: 6 goals: Galatasaray S.K. (5) v Alanyaspor (1), 25 December 2016
- Fastest goals on Christmas Day: 1st minute: Nelson Cabrera, Club Always Ready v C.D. Palmaflor del Trópico, 25 December 2020
- Fastest goals on Christmas Eve: 12 seconds: Orlando Pirates v Marumo Gallants 24 December 2024 (Own goal)
- Fastest goals by women's on Christmas Day: 5th minute: Kozue Ando, v Mynavi Sendai, 25 December 2022
- Latest goals: 90+11th minute: Amir Hadžiahmetović, Konyaspor v Alanyaspor, 25 December 2022
- Fastest 2 goals to start the match: 3rd minute: Club Always Ready v C.D. Palmaflor del Trópico, 25 December 2020

=== NHL television games records (1919-1972) ===
- Never played NHL Christmas games: (20 teams)
  - Anaheim Ducks
  - Calgary Flames
  - Carolina Hurricanes
  - Colorado Avalanche
  - Columbus Blue Jackets
  - Edmonton Oilers
  - Florida Panthers
  - Minnesota Wild
  - Nashville Predators
  - New Jersey Devils
  - New York Islanders
  - Ottawa Senators
  - San Jose Sharks
  - Seattle Kraken
  - Tampa Bay Lightning
  - Utah Mammoth
  - Vancouver Canucks
  - Vegas Golden Knights
  - Washington Capitals
  - Winnipeg Jets
- Most shots by a one team in a Christmas Day game: 54 shots: Boston Bruins vs. Los Angeles Kings, December 25, 1969
- Most shots by a one team in a Christmas Day period: 22 shots: Boston Bruins vs. Pittsburgh Penguins, December 25, 1970
- Most shots by a both teams in a Christmas Day game: 85 shots: Los Angeles Kings (31) at Boston Bruins (54), December 25, 1969
- Most shots by a both teams in a Christmas Day period: 33 shots: Los Angeles Kings (13) at Boston Bruins (20), December 25, 1969 (2nd period)
- Fewest shots by a one team in a Christmas Day game: 17 shots: New York Rangers at Chicago Blackhawks, December 25, 1966
- Fewest shots by a one team in a Christmas Day period: (2 times)
  - 3 shots: Oakland Seals at Boston Bruins, December 25, 1967 (3rd period)
  - 3 shots: New York Rangers at Chicago Blackhawks, December 25, 1966 (1st period)
- Fewest shots by both teams in a Christmas Day game: 43 shots: New York Rangers (17) at Chicago Blackhawks (27), December 25, 1966
- Fewest shots by both teams in a Christmas Day period: 10 shots: Minnesota North Stars (5) vs. St. Louis Blues (5), December 25, 1968 (3rd period)
- Most shots by one team in a Christmas Eve game: 48 shots: Toronto Maple Leafs vs. Los Angeles Kings, December 24, 1969
- Most shots by both teams in a Christmas Eve game: 86 shots: Toronto Maple Leafs (48) vs. Los Angeles Kings (38), December 24, 1969
- Fewest shots by one team in a Christmas Eve game: (2 times)
  - 23 shots: Montreal Canadiens vs. New York Rangers, December 24, 1966
  - 23 shots: Montreal Canadiens vs. Chicago Blackhawks, December 24, 1960
- Fewest shots by both teams in a Christmas Eve game: 47 shots: Montreal Canadiens (23) vs. Chicago Blackhawks (24), December 24, 1960
- Most shots by one team in a Christmas Eve period: 20 shots: Toronto Maple Leafs vs. Los Angeles Kings, December 24, 1969 (3rd period)
- Most shots by both teams in a Christmas Eve period: 34 shots: Toronto Maple Leafs (20) vs. Los Angeles Kings (14), December 24, 1969 (3rd period)
- Fewest shots by one team in a Christmas Eve period: (4 times)
  - 6 shots: California Golden Seals vs. Los Angeles Kings, December 24, 1972 (1st period)
  - 6 shots: California Golden Seals vs. Los Angeles Kings, December 24, 1972 (2nd period)
  - 6 shots: Detroit Red Wings at New York Rangers, December 24, 1972 (3rd period)
  - 6 shots: Montreal Canadiens vs. New York Rangers, December 24, 1966 (2nd period)
- Fewest shots by both teams in a Christmas Eve period: (2 times)
  - 14 shots: California Golden Seals (6) vs. Los Angeles Kings (8), December 24, 1972 (1st period)
  - 14 shots: Toronto Maple Leafs (7) at Chicago Blackhawks (7), December 24, 1972 (2nd period)

== See also ==
- Christmas in the media
- List of Christmas television specials
- List of A Christmas Carol adaptations
- List of Christmas films
- List of Christmas television episodes and specials in the United Kingdom
- List of United States Christmas television specials
- Christmas music
- List of Halloween television specials
- List of Thanksgiving television specials
- List of Easter television specials
- List of St. Patrick's Day television specials
- List of Valentine's Day television specials
- List of Independence Day television specials
