= James Walker Benét =

American writer and journalist (1914–2012)

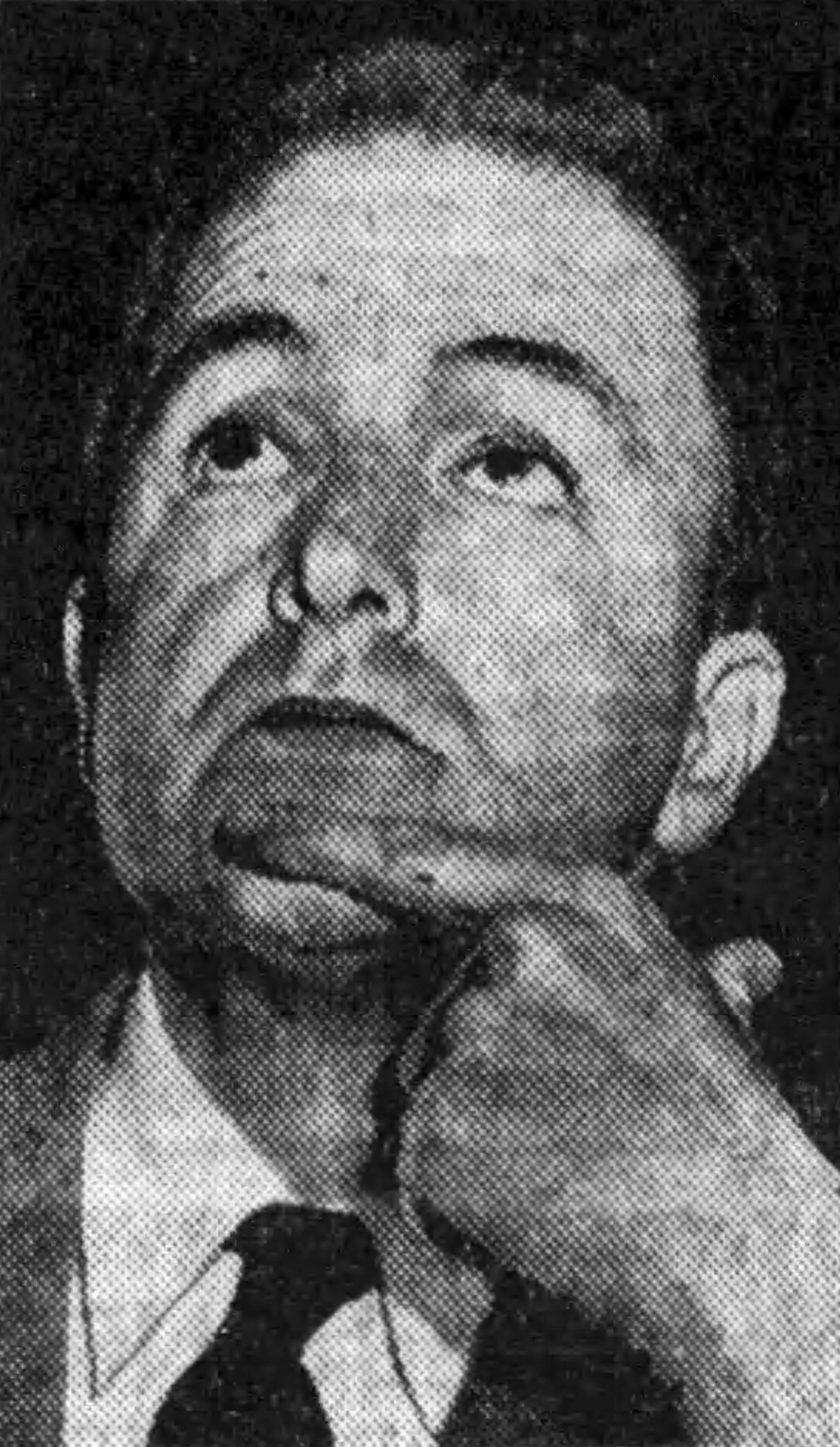
Benét c. 1953

James Walker Benét (1914 – December 16, 2012) was an American journalist, author, and reporter for the San Francisco Chronicle and KQED. Benét was one of the last surviving veterans of the Abraham Lincoln Brigade, a group of American volunteers during the Spanish Civil War who fought for the Republicans as part of the International Brigades.

== Background ==
Benét was born in 1914 in New York City. His father, Pulitzer Prize winner William Rose Benét, founded the Saturday Review of Literature. His aunt, novelist Kathleen Norris, raised him in Marin County, California, after the death of his mother when he was a young child. Benet's uncle, Stephen Vincent Benét, was a writer and poet who won a Pulitzer Prize for John Brown's Body.

=== Academics and involvement in Spanish Civil War ===
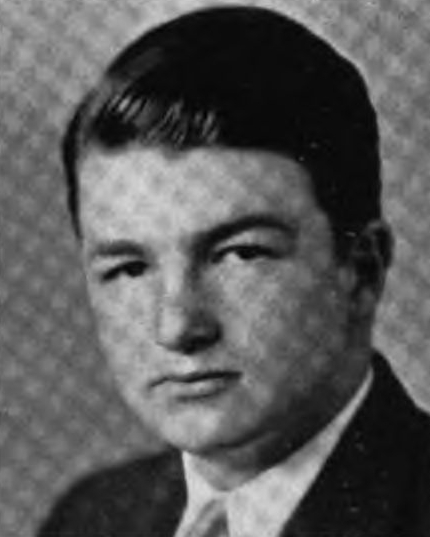
Benét in the Stanford University yearbook, 1935

Benét graduated from Stanford University in 1935. He worked at The New Republic after college, before going to Spain to fight with the Abraham Lincoln Brigade. He was a brigade combat soldier and ambulance driver from 1936 to 1937, later leaving Spain when the war turned in favor of Francisco Franco. In a 2012 interview with Public Radio International, Benét explained his reasoning for joining the war, "If the moment comes when it's the obvious right thing and somebody's got to do it, maybe it's going to be you...I always felt that I was on the right side of history in Spain."

== Newspaper career ==
After returning to the United States, he worked as a reporter for The New Republic and the Telegraph Agency of the Soviet Union (TASS) during World War II.

Benét joined the staff of the San Francisco Chronicle in 1947 as a copy editor. He was soon subpoenaed by the House Un-American Activities Committee in Washington D.C., who wanted information on his time in Spain during the war. While Benét appeared before the committee, he refused to their questions, a position supported by his superiors at the San Francisco Chronicle. The House Un-American Activities Committee ultimately took no action against Benét.

Benét later transitioned from a copy editor to education reporter at the San Francisco Chronicle. He left the newspaper in the late 1960s to work as a reporter at KQED's "Newsroom" from the 1960s until the show's cancellation in 1977. Additionally, he authored a guide book to the San Francisco Bay Area, as well as two mystery novels. He also taught journalism the University of California, Berkeley, and San Francisco State College. He retired in 1979 and moved to Sonoma County, California.

== Married life and death ==
James Benét was married three times. He and his first wife, actress Mary Liles, divorced. He then married Jane Gugel, the San Francisco Chronicle food editor and columnist who wrote under the pen name "Jane Friendly." Following Gugel's death, Benét married her sister-in-law, Ruth Gugel, who later died, leaving him a widower.

Benét died in Santa Rosa, California, on December 16, 2012, at the age of 98. He had resided in Forestville, California.
