= Birgit Nilsson =

Swedish dramatic soprano (1918–2005)

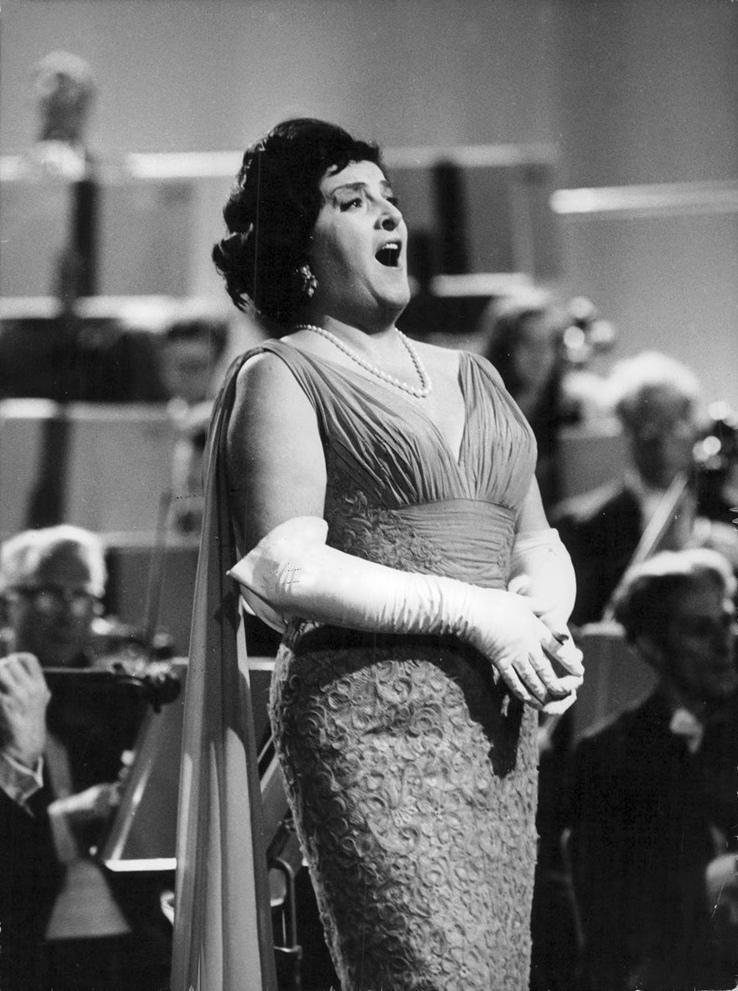
- Birgit Nilsson during a televised opera concert in Stockholm in July 1963.
- Born: 17 May 1918; Västra Karup, Skåne, Sweden
- Died: 25 December 2005 (aged 87); Kristianstad, Skåne, Sweden
- Education: Royal Swedish Academy of Music
- Occupation: Wagnerian soprano
- Years active: 1946–1984
- Awards: Hovsångerska, 1954; Bavarian Kammersängerin; Commandeur des Arts et des Lettres; Gramophone's Hall of Fame in 2012; Illis quorum

Märta Birgit Nilsson (17 May 1918 – 25 December 2005) was a Swedish dramatic soprano renowned for her exceptional vocal stamina and powerful voice, with its gleaming brilliance and clarity in the upper register. Although she sang a wide repertoire of operatic and vocal works, Nilsson was best known for her performances of Richard Wagner, particularly as Isolde in Tristan und Isolde and Brünnhilde in Der Ring des Nibelungen, and the title roles of Richard Strauss's Salome and Giacomo Puccini's Turandot. After her debut at the Royal Swedish Opera in Stockholm in 1946, she established an international career at leading opera houses, including the Vienna State Opera, New York's Metropolitan Opera, and La Scala.

== Biography ==
=== Early life ===
Birgit Nilsson was born Märta Birgit Svensson on a farm at Västra Karup in Skåne (100 km/60 miles north of Malmö) to Nils Svensson and Justina Svensson (née Paulsson). When she was three years old she began picking out melodies on a toy piano her mother bought for her. She once told an interviewer that she could sing before she could walk, adding, "I even sang in my dreams". Her vocal talent was first noticed when she began to sing in her church choir. A choirmaster near her home heard her sing and advised her to take voice lessons.

She studied with Ragnar Blennow in Åstorp for six months to prepare for an audition at the Royal Swedish Academy of Music in Stockholm where she came in first out of a group of 47 singers and was awarded the Christina Nilsson scholarship named for the famous soprano. Her teachers at the academy were Joseph Hislop and Arne Sunnegårdh. However, she considered herself self-taught: "The best teacher is the stage", she told an interviewer in 1981. "You walk out onto it, and you have to learn to project." She deplored her early instruction and attributed her success to native talent. "My first voice teacher [Hislop] almost killed me ... [T]he second was almost as bad."

=== Early career ===
In 1946, Nilsson made her debut at the Royal Swedish Opera in Stockholm with only three days' notice, replacing the ailing singer scheduled for the role of Agathe in Carl Maria von Weber's Der Freischütz. Conductor Leo Blech was not very kind to her and, as she wrote in her autobiography, she even contemplated suicide after the performance. In 1947 she claimed national attention in Verdi's Lady Macbeth conducted by Fritz Busch. A wealth of parts followed, from Richard Strauss and Verdi to Wagner, Puccini, and Tchaikovsky. In Stockholm she built up a steady repertoire of roles in the lyric-dramatic field, including Donna Anna in Don Giovanni, Aida, Lisa in The Queen of Spades (opera), Tosca, Venus in Tannhäuser, Sieglinde in Die Walküre, Senta in Der fliegende Holländer and the Marschallin in Der Rosenkavalier, one of her favourite roles, all sung in Swedish. In 1949 she sang in Ariadne auf Naxos with Hjördis Schymberg and Elisabeth Söderström among others.

=== International engagements ===
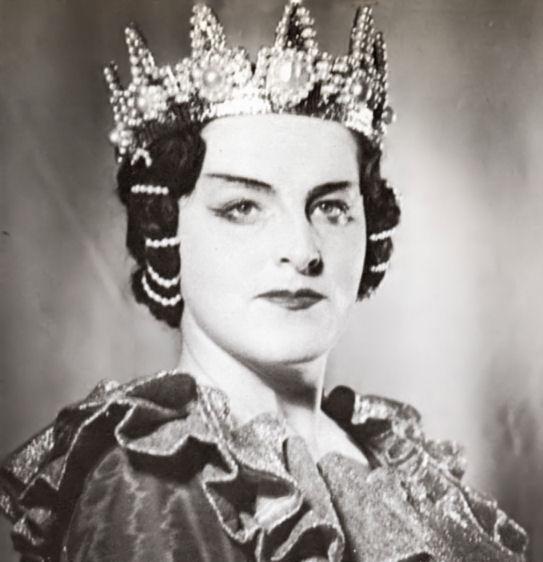
Nilsson as Lady Macbeth in the opera by Verdi at the Royal Swedish Opera, Stockholm, 1947

Under Fritz Busch's tutelage, her career took wing. He was instrumental in securing her first important engagement outside Sweden, as Electra in Mozart's Idomeneo at the Glyndebourne Festival in 1951. Her debut at the Vienna State Opera in 1953 was a turning point; she would be a regular performer there for more than 25 years. It was followed by Elsa in Wagner's Lohengrin at the Bayreuth Festival in 1954, then her first Brünnhilde in a complete Ring at the Bavarian State Opera, at the Munich Opera Festival of 1954. Later she returned as Sieglinde, Brünnhilde, and Isolde until 1969.

She took the title role of Turandot, which is brief but requires an unusually big sound, to La Scala in Milan in 1958, and then to the rest of Italy. Nilsson made her American debut as Brünnhilde in Wagner's Die Walküre in 1956 with the San Francisco Opera. She attained international stardom after a performance as Isolde at the Metropolitan Opera in New York City in 1959, which made front-page news. She said that the single biggest event in her life was being asked to perform at the opening of the 180th season at La Scala as Turandot in 1958. She performed at many major opera houses in the world including Vienna, Berlin, the Royal Opera House at Covent Garden, Tokyo, Paris, Buenos Aires, Chicago, and Hamburg.

She sang with the Sydney Symphony Orchestra in the all-Wagner concert that opened the Concert Hall of the Sydney Opera House in 1973.

=== From the 1960s through to the 1980s ===
Nilsson was widely known as the leading Wagnerian soprano of her time, the successor to the great Norwegian soprano Kirsten Flagstad, particularly as Brünnhilde. However, she also sang many of the other famous soprano roles, among them Leonore, Aida, Turandot, Tosca, Elektra, and Salome. She had, according to The New York Times, a "voice of impeccable trueness and impregnable stamina".

The conductor Erich Leinsdorf thought that her longevity, like Flagstad's, had something to do with her Scandinavian heritage, remarking that Wagner required "thoughtful, patient and methodical people." Nilsson attributed her long career to no particular lifestyle or regimen. "I do nothing special", she once said. "I don't smoke. I drink a little wine and beer. I was born with the right set of parents."

In sheer power, her high notes were sometimes compared to those of the Broadway belter Ethel Merman. However Nilsson claims her "explosive" high notes that were her biggest asset on-stage "have not been recorded like they should have been" in the studio. She later lamented: "It always made me a little bit sad when I heard my own recordings. And many people told me that I sang much better in person than I do on the recordings! That didn't flatter me at all, because I know what's going to be left when I am no longer singing".

Twice at the Met, Nilsson sustained injuries that kept her from performing. In February 1971, she sprained her ankle during a performance of Elektra that resulted in cancellation of one performance (that was replaced by a performance of Fidelio starring Christa Ludwig). Nilsson recovered to sing the broadcast performance of Elektra on 27 February. More seriously, in March 1974 she fell and dislocated her shoulder during a rehearsal of Götterdämmerung. While recuperating in her hospital room at Roosevelt Hospital she said, "other than my bruises and my black and blues I feel fine". Although able to sing Brünnhilde for the first two performances with her arm in a sling, her injury caused her to miss subsequent performances, including that season's Götterdämmerung broadcast. The New York Times' review by Harold C. Schonberg of the production's 8 March 1974 opening night is reprinted in the Metropolitan Opera archives.

=== "Miss N." ===
Beginning in the summer of 1968 at the Bayreuth Festival, Nilsson was obsessively stalked by a much younger American actress and model, Nell Theobald, until Theobald's suicide nine years later in 1977. Nilsson recounted her experiences with Theobald at length in her memoir, La Nilsson, in which she referred to Theobald solely as "Miss N." The stalking incident was later featured in Opera News magazine and The New York Times.

=== Nilsson's humour ===
Nilsson did not get along with famous conductor Herbert von Karajan. Once when rehearsing on stage at the Vienna Staatsoper, her string of pearls broke. While helping her retrieve them, Karajan asked, "Are these real pearls bought with your La Scala fees?" Nilsson replied, "No, these are fake pearls bought with your Vienna Staatsoper fees." When Nilsson first arrived at the Met to rehearse the production of Die Walküre conducted by Karajan, she said, "Nu, where's Herbie?" And Karajan once sent Nilsson a cable several pages long, proposing in great detail a variety of projects, different dates and operas. Nilsson cabled back: "Busy. Birgit."

The Swedish photographer Lennart Nilsson, who became world famous for his documentation of pregnancy from conception to birth, was asked by the magazine Life to photograph Birgit Nilsson's vocal cords as she sang high C. Birgit Nilsson turned the proposal down with the words "Your photographer wants me to swallow the tiny camera so he can take pictures of the vocal cord ^{[sic]}. I don't want that, since I know where it has been before." Eventually, though, she agreed on having the pictures taken.

There was a healthy competition between Nilsson and tenor Franco Corelli as to who could hold the high C the longest in act 2 of Turandot. In one tour performance, after she outlasted him on the high C, he stormed off to Rudolf Bing during the next intermission, saying that he was not going to continue the performance. Bing, who knew how to handle Corelli's tantrums, suggested that he retaliate by biting Nilsson on the neck when Calaf kisses Turandot in act 3. Corelli didn't bite her but he was so delighted with the idea that he told her about Bing's suggestion. She then cabled Bing, informing him she had to cancel the next two performances because she had contracted rabies.

When Nilsson started singing Aida at the Met, soprano Zinka Milanov was miffed as Aida had theretofore been "her" role. After one performance in which Nilsson was singing, Milanov commandeered and drove off in the Rolls-Royce Nilsson had hired for after the performance. When asked about this afterwards, Milanov said "If Madame Nilsson takes my roles, I must take her Rolls."

The secret to singing Isolde, she said, was "comfortable shoes." After a disagreement with the Australian soprano Joan Sutherland, Nilsson was asked if she thought Sutherland's famous bouffant hairdo was real. She answered: "I don't know. I haven't pulled it yet."

Once, asked what was her favourite role, she answered: "Isolde made me famous. Turandot made me rich." When long-time Metropolitan Opera director Sir Rudolf Bing was asked if she was difficult, he reportedly said "Not at all. You put enough money in, and a glorious voice comes out." When Nilsson was preparing her taxes and was asked if she had any dependents, she replied, "Yes, just one, Rudolf Bing."

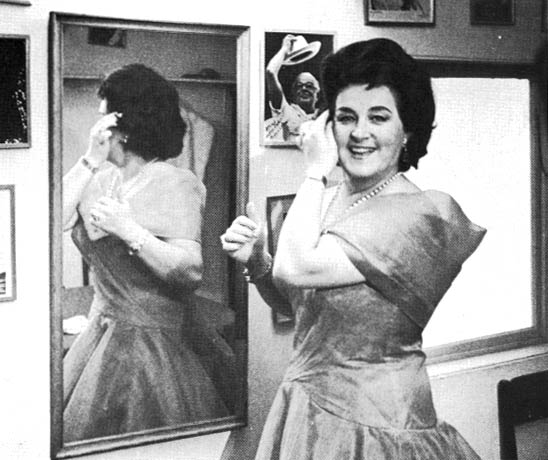
Nilsson behind the stage at Gröna Lund, Stockholm, 1960s

=== Interactions with conductors ===
Nilsson was known for standing up to conductors. In a 1967 rehearsal of Die Walküre with Herbert von Karajan conducting, Nilsson responded to the gloomy lighting of the production by wearing a miner's helmet (complete with Valkyrian wings). When on some occasion von Karajan urged a retake "but this time with more heart. That's the place where you have your purse", Nilsson replied, "I'm so pleased to find we have something in common." When Georg Solti, in Tristan und Isolde, insisted on tempos too slow for Nilsson's taste, she made the first performance even slower, inducing a change of heart in the conductor.

=== Self-criticism ===
Despite her worldwide recognition, Nilsson said she was nervous before every major performance. "Before a premiere, on the way to the opera, I'd hope for just a small, small accident, it didn't need to be much, but just so I would not have to sing", she said in a 1977 interview on Swedish TV. Nilsson often spoke of her limits. She said her voice was not a good fit with what she described as the softer textures and refined tones of Italian operas. Nonetheless, she sang roles in Italianate operas such as Donna Anna in Don Giovanni.

=== Recordings ===
Nilsson recorded all of her major roles in major commercial recordings of the complete works, as well as about a dozen solo recitals of arias, art songs, concerts, and hymns—all were originally released on vinyl LP format and most have been reissued on CD or in digital format. Partly because of her availability to play Brünnhilde, Decca Records undertook the expensive project of making a studio recording of Wagner's four-opera Ring Cycle, conducted by Solti and produced by John Culshaw. The effort took seven years, from 1958 to 1965. The BBC released a 90-minute documentary, The Golden Ring – The Making of Solti's "Ring", produced and narrated by Humphrey Burton.

=== Absence from New York and Salzburg ===
Though a frequent visitor to the Metropolitan Opera, Nilsson did not always see eye to eye with its redoubtable general manager, Rudolf Bing (who was often said to dislike Wagner), nor with conductor Herbert von Karajan. Subsequently, she made fewer New York appearances than hoped in the early 1970s and was virtually excluded from the Salzburg Festival. Her American career was derailed in the mid-1970s by US Internal Revenue Service claims filed for back taxes. Several years later a schedule of payments was worked out, and Nilsson's hiatus from the United States ended. When she returned, Donal Henahan wrote in The New York Times, "The famous shining trumpet of a voice is still far from sounding like a cornet."

Nilsson appeared at the Metropolitan Opera 223 times in 16 roles. She sang two complete Ring cycles in the 1961–62 season, and another in 1974–75. She was Isolde 33 times, and Turandot 52. She played most of the other major soprano parts: Aida, Tosca, the Dyer's Wife in Strauss's Die Frau ohne Schatten, Salome, Elektra, Verdi's Lady Macbeth, and Leonore in Beethoven's Fidelio. In 1966 she simultaneously performed the roles of Venus and Elisabeth (who never appear together) in Wagner's Tannhäuser. She memorably appeared as replacement Sieglinde to Rita Hunter's Brünnhilde in the 1970s. She appeared 232 times at the Vienna State Opera from 1954 to 1982, and the Vienna Philharmonic, the company's orchestra, made her an honorary member in 1999. "If there ever was someone that one can call a real star today and a world-famous opera singer during her time then that was Frau Nilsson", said Ioan Holender, director of the Vienna State Opera.

=== Later life ===
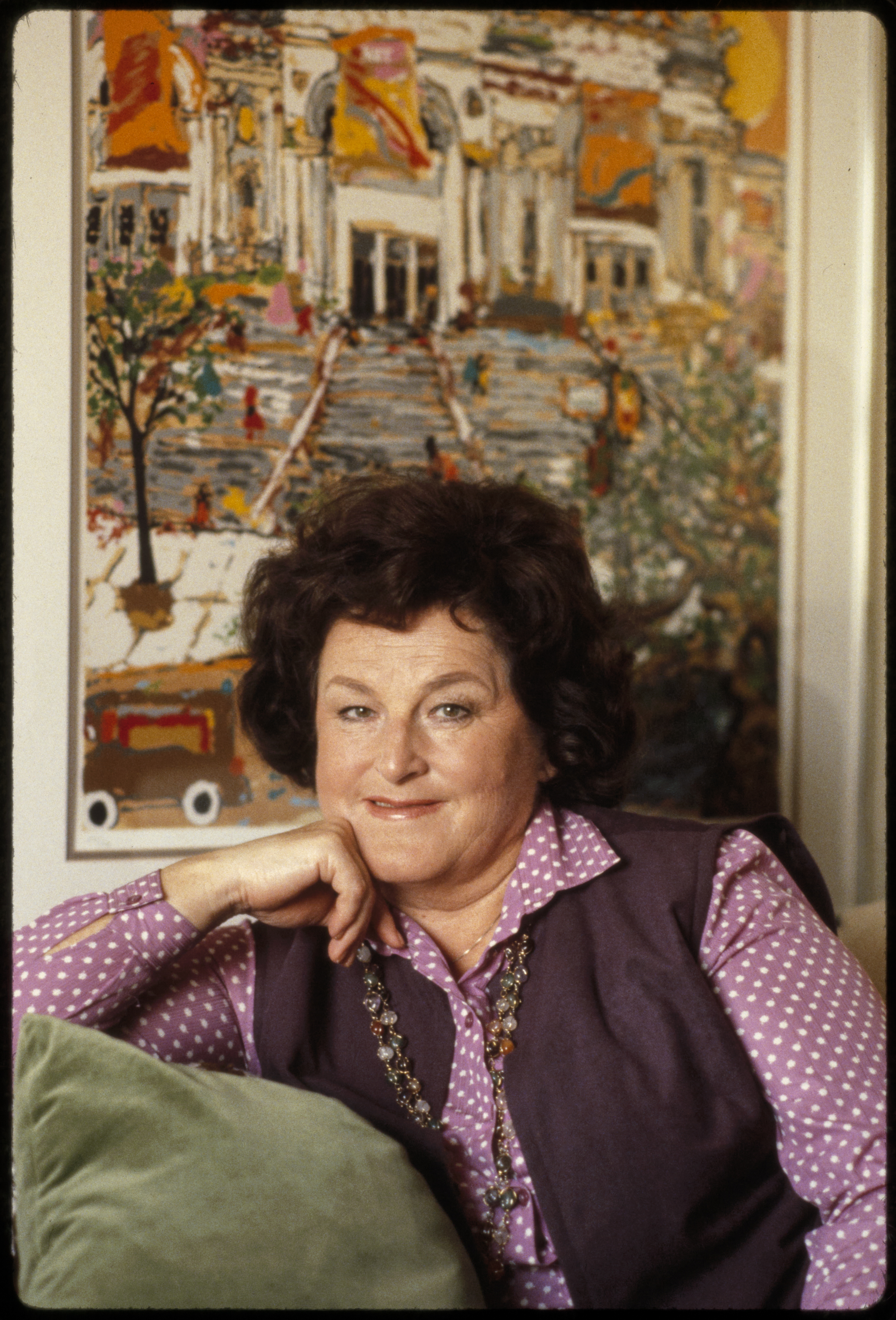
Birgit Nilsson in 1981

Nilsson's autobiography, Mina minnesbilder (My memoirs in pictures) was published in Stockholm in 1977. She retired in 1984 to her childhood home in the Skåne province of southern Sweden, where her father had been a sixth-generation farmer and she had worked to grow beets and potatoes until she was 23. In an interview in the mid-1990s, she appeared happy, serene and as unpretentious as ever. "I've always tried to remember what my mother used to tell me", she said. "Stay close to the earth. Then when you fall down, it won't hurt so much."

In 1981, Sweden issued a postage stamp showing Nilsson as Turandot. She received the Illis quorum gold medal, today the highest award that can be conferred upon a Swedish citizen by the Government of Sweden. In 1988, on the occasion of the 350th anniversary of New Sweden, the first Swedish settlement in America, The American-Scandinavian Foundation named their prize for promising young American opera singers the Birgit Nilsson Prize. Nilsson personally chaired several competitions.

=== Death ===
Nilsson died, aged 87, on 25 December 2005 at her home at Bjärlöv, a small village near Kristianstad in Skåne in the same county where she was born. No cause of death was released. She was survived by her husband Bertil Niklasson (died March 2007), a veterinary surgeon whom she had met on a train and married in 1948. They had no children.

== Legacy ==
Three years after Nilsson's death, in December 2008, the Birgit Nilsson Foundation announced that it would award a prize every two to three years to a concert or opera singer, a classical or opera conductor, or a specific production by an opera company. The prize was funded by Nilsson herself. The foundation said that Nilsson had chosen the first winner, to be announced in early 2009.

On 20 February 2009, Spanish tenor Plácido Domingo was announced as the inaugural recipient of the prize, which carried with it a cash award of $1,000,000. The first award ceremony took place in the Royal Swedish Opera on 13 October 2009. King Carl XVI Gustaf of Sweden personally presented the prize to the designated winner. A jury has been set up by the foundation to make recommendations for future prizes. The second winner of the Birgit Nilsson prize was Riccardo Muti, who received the award in Stockholm on 13 October 2011. On 9 April 2014 it was announced that the third recipient of the prize would be the Vienna Philharmonic.

A Pågatågen train has been named for Nilsson by operator Skånetrafiken, with the train Birgit Nilsson being the first in the new X61 series to depart Malmö Central Station in December 2009.

On 6 April 2011, the Bank of Sweden announced that Nilsson's portrait will feature on the 500 kronor banknote, beginning in October 2016.

== Honours and awards ==
- 1954 Hovsångerska (Royal Court Singer), Stockholm, Sweden
- 1958 Gold Medal, Teatro Liceo, Barcelona, Spain
- 1960 Sweden: Royal medal Litteris et Artibus
- 1960 Honorary member of the Royal Swedish Academy of Music, Stockholm
- 1966 Sonning Award, Denmark
- 1967 Gold Medal For the Promotion of the Art of Music (Swedish: För tonkonstens främjande) of the Royal Swedish Academy of Music, Stockholm
- 1968 Austrian Kammersängerin in 1968
- 1968 Honorary Member of the Vienna State Opera, Vienna, Austria
- 1970 Honorary doctorate from Merrimack College, Andover, Mass. USA
- 1970 Honorary Member of the Royal Academy of Music, London, England
- 1970 Bavarian Kammersängerin, Munich, Germany
- 1972 Denmark: Royal medal Ingenio et Arti
- 1974 Sweden: Commander First Class of the Order of Vasa
- 1975 Norway: Commander First Class of the Order of St. Olav
- 1981 Gold medal of the Royal Swedish Opera (Swedish: Kungliga Operan), Stockholm
- 1981 Sweden: Illis Quorum gold medal, 18th grade with chain
- 1982 Honorary doctorate from the Manhattan School of Music, New York City
- 1982 Honorary doctorate from Michigan State University, East Lansing, US
- 1982 Swedish-American of the Year Award, New York City
- 1988 Germany: Cross of Merit First Class of the Lower Saxony Order of Merit, Land of Lower Saxony
- 1991 France: Commandeur des Arts et des Lettres
- 1993 Royal Opera House Silver Medal for 25-year's service as a Guest Artist, London, England
- 1994 Award of the Sweden–America Foundation (Swedish: Sverige-Amerikastiftelsen), New York City
- 1997 Honorary doctorate of the Sibelius Academy, Helsinki, Finland
- 1999 Honorary member of the Vienna Philharmonic, Vienna, Austria
- 2012 Gramophone's Hall of Fame in 2012

== Videography ==
- The Metropolitan Opera Centennial Gala, Deutsche Grammophon DVD, 00440-073-4538
