= A Child Is Born =

A Child Is Born may refer to:

== Music ==
- A Child Is Born (album), a 2011 album by Geri Allen
- "A Child Is Born" (jazz standard), a 1969 instrumental by Thad Jones
- A Child Is Born, a 1993 recording by Choir of Trinity College, Cambridge, under Richard Marlow
- "A Child Is Born", a song by Brand Nubian from the 1997 soundtrack Soul in the Hole
- "A Child Is Born", 1955 incidental music by Bernard Herrmann

== Other uses ==
- A Child Is Born (book), a 1965 photographic book by Lennart Nilsson
- A Child Is Born (film), a 1939 film written by Robert Rossen
- A Child Is Born (radio play), a 1942 poetic one-act Christmas drama by Stephen Vincent Benét

== See also ==
- "When a Child Is Born", a 1974 song usually associated with Christmas, with a tune from Ciro Dammicco (alias Zacar) and lyrics from Fred Jay, performed by Michael Holm and Johnny Mathis, among others
- A Boy Was Born, Op. 3, a 1933 choral composition by Benjamin Britten
