= 11th International Emmy Awards =

1983 awards ceremony

- Date: November 21, 1983
- Location: Sheraton New York Times Square Hotel, New York City
- Hosted by: Mary Tyler Moore

The 11th International Emmy Awards took place on November 21, 1983 in New York City and hosted by American actress Mary Tyler Moore. The award ceremony, presented by the International Academy of Television Arts and Sciences (IATAS), honors all programming produced and originally aired outside the United States.

== Ceremony ==
The 11th international Emmys ceremony was presented by the International Academy of Television Arts and Sciences (IATAS). The Gala night was mostly for English-language television shows, in particular Great Britain, which led the nominations with five nominations, winning in three categories. Canadian TV series Fraggle Rock, won the Emmy for best children's program. Granada Television's telefilm King Lear won best drama. The special Dangerous Music, produced by Alex Kirby for the UK channel HTV, was awarded in the performing arts category. Blackadder won the award for best popular art program and the award for best documentary went to The Miracle of Life by Sveriges Television.

Brazil's Roberto Marinho (President of Organizações Globo), was honored by the International Academy with the Directorate Award, vying for the prize with Leonard Goldenson, president of the ABC network, William Pailey, founder of CBS, and Emilio Azcarraga, president of the Mexican network Televisa.

== Winners ==
=== Best Drama ===
- King Lear (United Kingdom: Granada Television)

=== Best Documentary ===
- The Miracle of Life (Sweden: Sveriges Television)

=== Best Performing Arts ===
- Blackadder (United Kingdom: BBC One)

=== Best Popular Arts Program ===
- Dangerous Music (United Kingdom: HTV)

=== Best Children's Program ===
- Fraggle Rock (Canada: CBC Television)
