= Benet's Reader's Encyclopedia =

Reference book on world literature

- Author: William Rose Benét
- Genre: Encyclopedia
- Publication date: 1948
- ISBN: 978-0-06-089016-2

Benét's Reader's Encyclopedia is an American reference work devoted to world literature. The first volume appeared in 1948, edited by Pulitzer Prize-winner William Rose Benét, older brother of the writer Stephen Vincent Benét. Benét set out to "present to [the reader] a well-organized supplementary memory, in one volume". The encyclopedia was based on Ebenezer Cobham Brewer's classic Dictionary of Phrase and Fable, and offered a compendium of curious information (such as "Aani. In Egyptian mythology, the dog-headed ape sacred to the god Thoth"). The second edition appeared in 1965, with the addition of new entries, the expansion of old entries, and the addition of illustrations.

== Further editions ==
The second edition appeared in 1965, with the addition of new entries, the expansion of old entries, and the addition of illustrations.

More widely available is the third edition, edited by Katherine Baker Siepmann and published in 1987. While this edition no longer mentions such arcane figures as Aani, it offers substantial background on a wide variety of literary figures and increased the international scope of the volume. Jeppe Aakjaer, for instance, appears as a novelist who "was intensely concerned with social misery and the need for reform," though he is "best known" for his "lyric poetry, in which he celebrates the courage of the peasants and the beauties of his native Jutland."

In 1996, the fourth edition of this reference work appeared. The fifth and to date most recent edition was released in December 2008.

Benet's Reader's Encyclopedia of American Literature (ISBN 0-06-270110-X) was published in 1991 by Harper Collins Publishers. The book contains facts on American authors' major and lesser works, summarizes the critical consensus, gives biographical information and often lists secondary biographical and critical works.
