= Hov Church (Scania) =

Church in Scania, Sweden

Coordinates: 56.43570967914925°N 12.728374351307572°E

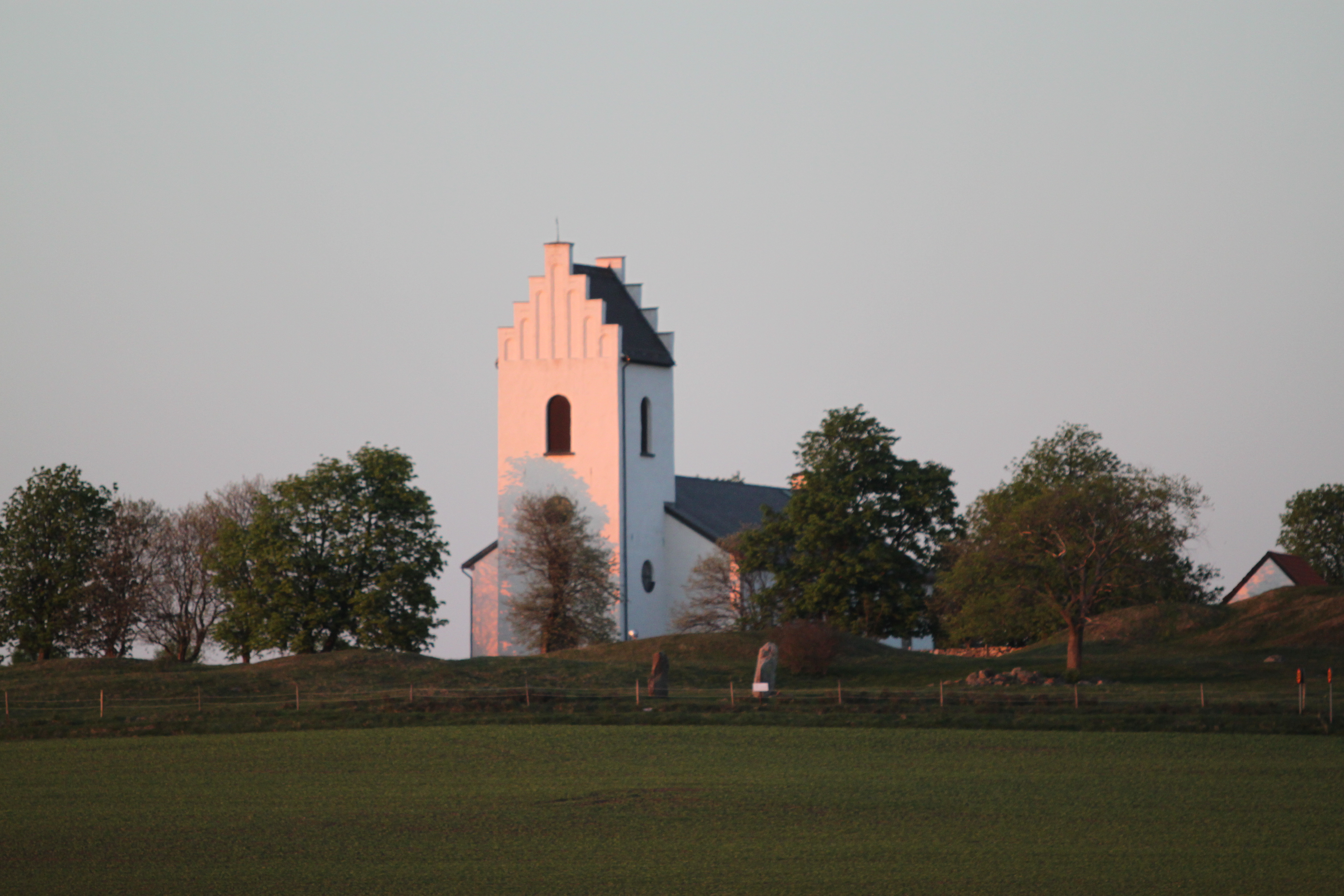
Hov Church in May 2011

Hov Church (Swedish: Hovs kyrka) is located in the village of Hov, Båstad, Scania, Sweden and is one of the three churches used by the parish of Västra Karup.

The current church was built in 1837–1839 to designs by architect Samuel Enander. It is the third church at the same location. The first church was built during the 11th or 12th century. This was enlarged or rebuilt during the 16th century. Its baptismal font is carved in stone and is an artifact from the first church. It is dated to the 13th century. The church also has a rood cross from the 12th century, while the current altarpiece, painted by Fritiof Swensson from Gothenburg, was put up in 1922.
