= Kathleen Norris =

American writer (1880–1966)

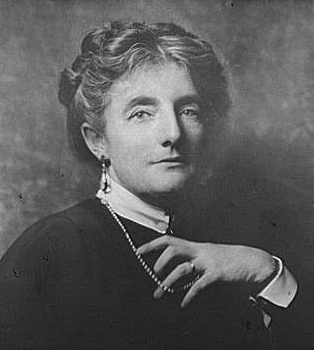
- Norris in 1925, photograph by Arnold Genthe
- Born: July 16, 1880; San Francisco, California, U.S.
- Died: January 18, 1966 (aged 85); San Francisco, California, U.S.
- Education: University of California, Berkeley
- Occupations: Novelist; journalist
- Spouse: Charles Gilman Norris (m. 1909)
- Parent(s): James Alden Thompson; Josephine Moroney

Kathleen Thompson Norris (July 16, 1880 – January 18, 1966) was an American novelist and newspaper columnist. She was one of the most widely read and highest paid female writers in the United States for nearly fifty years, from 1911 to 1959. Norris was a prolific writer who wrote 93 novels, many of which became best sellers. Her stories appeared frequently in the popular press of the day, including The Atlantic, The American Magazine, McClure's, Everybody's, Ladies' Home Journal, and Woman's Home Companion. Norris used her fiction to promote family and moralistic values, such as the sanctity of marriage, the nobility of motherhood, and the importance of service to others.

== Early life ==
Kathleen Thompson Norris was born in San Francisco, California, on July 16, 1880. Her parents were Josephine (née Moroney) and James Alden Thompson. When she was 19 both her parents died. As the oldest sibling she became effectively the head of a large family and had to work. Initially, she found employment in a department store, which was soon followed by work in an accounting office and then the Mechanic's Institute Library.

== Writing career ==
In 1905, she enrolled in a creative writing program at the University of California, Berkeley and began writing short stories. The San Francisco Call, which had published a few of her stories, hired her to write a society column in September 1906. In the course of that work she met Charles Gilman Norris (whose late elder brother was the novelist Frank Norris), and they soon fell in love. He moved to New York to be art editor of The American Magazine. After eight months of daily correspondence and some improvements in her family's financial situation, she joined him there and they were married in April 1909.

She resumed writing short stories, which began to appear in newspapers and then magazines starting in 1910. Charles took on a lifelong role as Kathleen's literary agent, and also took care of many household management roles as she became increasingly successful as a writer. Shortly after becoming a new mother, she wrote her first novel, Mother. It started as a short story in The American Magazine in 1911. A publisher asked her to expand it into a novelette, which became a national sensation and earned the praise of Theodore Roosevelt for its celebration of large families. A devout Catholic, she wrote the book in part as a commentary against birth control, which was rapidly influencing women's attitudes about motherhood. Her 1914 novel Saturday's Child received a positive, lengthy review from William Dean Howells, who remarked on her sensitivity to class issues.

Norris became involved in various social causes, including women's suffrage, Prohibition, pacifism, and organizations to benefit children and the poor.

Many of her novels were made into films, including Butterfly (1924), My Best Girl (1927), The Callahans and the Murphys (1927), Passion Flower (1930), and Change of Heart (1934, based on the novel Manhattan Love Song).

Some of Norris's novels were adapted for a radio series, By Kathleen Norris, making her "the first nationally famous writer to have her works brought to radio listeners as a daily serial program." The program, produced by Phillips Lord, was broadcast on CBS October 9, 1939 – September 26, 1941.

Norris died January 18, 1966, in San Francisco at the home of her son Dr. Frank Norris. She was 85.

== Family ==
In 1919 the family moved to a ranch in the Santa Cruz Mountains near Saratoga, California, adjacent to the Villa Montalvo estate of James Duval Phelan. They later built a house in Palo Alto and spent summers at the ranch. Kathleen's sister Teresa, who had married William Rose Benét and bore three children, died in 1919. Kathleen fought for and eventually obtained guardianship of the two nieces and a nephew: Rosemary, Kathleen Anne and James Benét.

Her granddaughter Kathleen Norris (1935–1967) was the second wife of Prince Andrew Romanoff (1923-2021).

== Selected bibliography ==
The Silver Sheet, a studio publication promoting Thomas Ince Productions, cover illustration of Christine of the Hungry Heart by Kathleen Norris

- Mother (1911; new edition, 1913)
- The Rich Mrs. Burgoyne (1912)
- Poor Dear Margaret Kirby (1913)
- The Treasure (1914)
- Saturday's Child (1914)
- The Story Of Julia Page (1915)
- The Heart of Rachael (1916)
- Martie the Unconquered (1917)
- Josselyn's Wife (1918)
- Sisters (1919)
- Harriet and the Piper (1920)
- The Beloved Woman (1921)
- Certain People of Importance (1922)
- Lucretia Lombard (1922)
- Little Ships (1925)
- Noon; an autobiographical sketch (1925)
- Hildegarde (1926)
- The Sea Gull (1927)
- The Foolish Virgin (1927)
- Younger Sister (1928)
- Home (1928)
- The Love of Julie Borel (1930)
- Second Hand Wife (1932)
- Maiden Voyage (1934)
- Beauty's Daughter (1935), adapted for the 1935 motion picture Navy Wife
- Shining Windows (1935)
- Bread into Roses (1936)
- Dedications (1936)
- Secret Marriage (1936)
- You Can't Have Everything (1937)
- Over at the Crowleys (1941)
- The Venables (1941)
- Through A Glass Darkly (1955)

== Filmography ==
- The Heart of Rachael, directed by Howard Hickman (1918, based on the novel The Heart of Rachael)
- Josselyn's Wife, directed by Howard Hickman (1919, based on the novel Josselyn's Wife)
- The Luck of Geraldine Laird, directed by Edward Sloman (1920, based on the novel The Luck of Geraldine Laird)
- Harriet and the Piper, directed by Bertram Bracken (1920, based on the novel Harriet and the Piper)
- Poor, Dear Margaret Kirby, directed by William P. S. Earle (1921, based on a story by Kathleen Norris)
- Sisters, directed by Albert Capellani (1922, based on the novel Sisters)
- Lucretia Lombard, directed by Jack Conway (1923, based on the novel Lucretia Lombard)
- Christine of the Hungry Heart, directed by George Archainbaud (1924, based on a story by Kathleen Norris)
- Butterfly, directed by Clarence Brown (1924, based on the novel Butterfly)
- Rose of the World, directed by Harry Beaumont (1925, based on the novel Rose of the World)
- Josselyn's Wife, directed by Richard Thorpe (1926, based on the novel Josselyn's Wife)
- Mother, directed by James Leo Meehan (1927, based on the novel Mother)
- The Callahans and the Murphys, directed by George Hill (1927, based on the novel The Callahans and the Murphys)
- My Best Girl, directed by Sam Taylor (1927, based on the novel My Best Girl)
- Passion Flower, directed by William C. deMille (1930, based on the novel Passion Flower)
- Second Hand Wife, directed by Hamilton MacFadden (1933, based on the novel Second Hand Wife)
- Walls of Gold, directed by Kenneth MacKenna (1933, based on the novel Walls of Gold)
- Change of Heart, directed by John G. Blystone (1934, based on the novel Manhattan Love Song)
- Navy Wife, directed by Allan Dwan (1935, based on the novel Beauty's Daughter)
