= Stephen Vincent Benét (general) =

U.S. Army brigadier general (1827–1895)

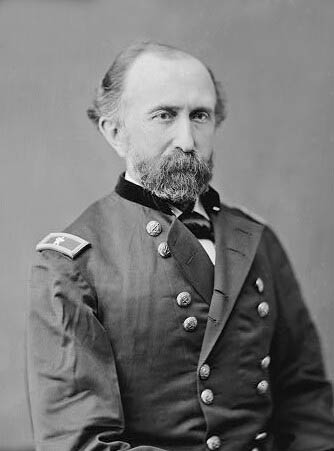
- Brigadier General Stephen Vincent Benét
- Born: January 22, 1827; St. Augustine, Florida
- Died: January 22, 1895 (aged 68); Washington, D.C.
- Burial place: Arlington National Cemetery
- Military career
- Allegiance: United States of America
- Branch: United States Army
- Service years: 1849–1891
- Rank: Brigadier General
- Commands: 8th Chief of Ordnance (1874-1891)
- Conflicts: American Civil War

Brigadier General Stephen Vincent Benét (January 22, 1827 – January 22, 1895) was a career officer in the United States Army and served as the 8th Chief of Ordnance for the U.S. Army Ordnance Corps.

== Early life ==
Stephen Vincent Benét was born in St. Augustine, Florida, on 22 January 1827, the son of a prominent political figure of Spanish descent. His grandfather, a native of Minorca, had settled in St. Augustine toward the end of the 18th century, and a great uncle had been a captain in the Spanish Navy.

At the age of 12, young Benét entered a private school in Alexandria, Virginia, where he compiled an outstanding record over a period of several years. On the strength of this background, he was admitted to the University of Georgia as a junior, but left before completing his course to enter West Point in June 1845. He was the first cadet ever admitted from his home state of Florida, which had been admitted to the Union just three months previously. Originally determined to pursue a career in law, Benét had considered remaining in the Army for a comparatively short period of time. He nonetheless consistently remained one of the top students in his class. He ultimately stood third in his class of 1849.

== Family ==
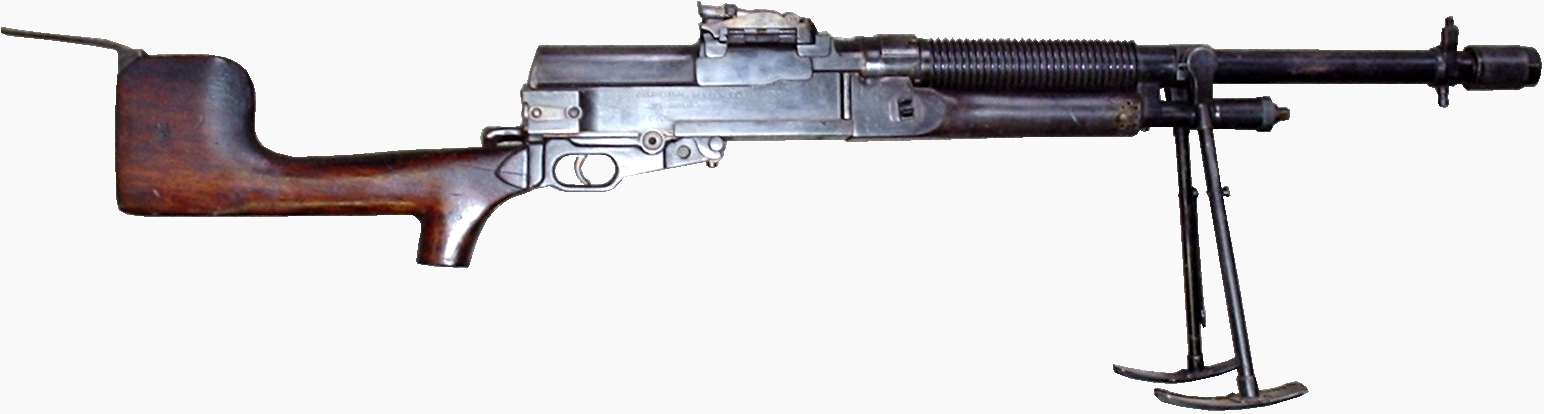
Hotchkiss M1909 Benét–Mercié machine gun

His son Laurence Vincent Benét was a longtime engineer at Hotchkiss et Cie, best known for designing the Hotchkiss M1909 Benét–Mercié machine gun, also participating in multiple other projects. His other son, James Walker Benét, became a colonel and parented three best-known General Benét's grandchildren, William Rose Benét, Stephen Vincent Benét, and Laura Benét, who went to become distinguished twentieth century writers.

=== Family tree ===
- Stephen Vincent Benét (1827–1895)
- Laura Amanda Walker (1833–1900)
- Esteban “Stephen” Benét (?-1812), grandfather
- Catalina Antonia Hernandez (1779–1846), grandmother
- Pedro Jose Lucio Benét (1798–1870), father
- Juana Hernandez (1800–1884), mother
- Estanislada Francisca Benét (1828–1897), brother
- Isabel F. Benét (1835–1915), sister
- Peter Leandro Benét (1837–1882), brother
- Joseph Ravina Benét (1844–1906), sister
- Laurence Vincent Benét (1865–1948), son
- James Walker Benét (1857–1928), son
- Laura Benét (1884–1979), granddaughter
- William Rose Benét (1886–1950), grandson
- Stephen Vincent Benét II (1898–1943), grandson
- James Walker Benét (1914–2012), great-grandson
- Frances Rosemary Benét (1915–1980), great-grandson
- Stephanie Jane Benét (1924–2005), great-granddaughter
- Thomas Carr Benét (1926–2016), great-grandson
- Rachel Felicity Benét (1931–1990), great-granddaughter

== Military career ==
During the 1850s, Benét served in a variety of posts at Watervliet, Frankford, and St. Louis Arsenals, and also taught geography, history, ethics and law at the Military Academy.

Promoted to captain in August 1861, Benét was again detailed to West Point, this time as an instructor in ordnance and gunnery. By 1864, he had been made commandant of Frankford Arsenal, a post he held for five years. In May 1865, Benét was awarded brevets of major and lieutenant colonel for faithful and meritorious service as an ordnance officer during the Civil War. Benét created and patented an internally primed center-fire cartridge in 1868.

When the Dyer Court of Inquiry was convened in 1868, Benét, by then a major, was assigned the task of serving as an expert witness in defense of his chief. He subsequently served on the Ordnance Board for a short time, inspected ordnance and projectiles, and experimented with Parrott guns at Cold Spring, New York.

On the death of General Dyer in June 1874, Benét was appointed brigadier general and the 8th Chief of Ordnance for the U.S Army Ordnance Corps. General Benét's tenure of nearly seventeen years was marked by the development of new facilities at the various ordnance installations around the country. Sandy Hook Proving Ground was established in August 1874. The Ordnance Board studied and recommended significant improvements for field artillery, including breech loaders, high angle fire weapons, elevating mechanisms to allow curved fire with reduced powder charges, uniform construction of interchangeable wheels, and folding trail handspikes. Considerable experimentation was carried on with seacoast guns, armor plate, and high explosives. The early modern machine guns were given some attention after they were first introduced in 1884, and work was also done on a pneumatic dynamite gun. General Benét was also credited with having successfully pressed for retention of the Arsenal system despite determined efforts by private industry to take over all weapons production. The General retired on his 64th birthday, January 22, 1891. During his four years in retirement, Benét was increasingly troubled by ill health, and he died in Washington, D.C., on his 68th birthday, January 22, 1895. He was buried at Arlington National Cemetery.

Military offices
| Preceded by Brigadier General Alexander B. Dyer | Chief of Ordnance of the United States Army; 1874– 1891 | Succeeded by Brigadier General Daniel W. Flagler |
