= Lucretia Lombard =

1923 film by Jack Conway

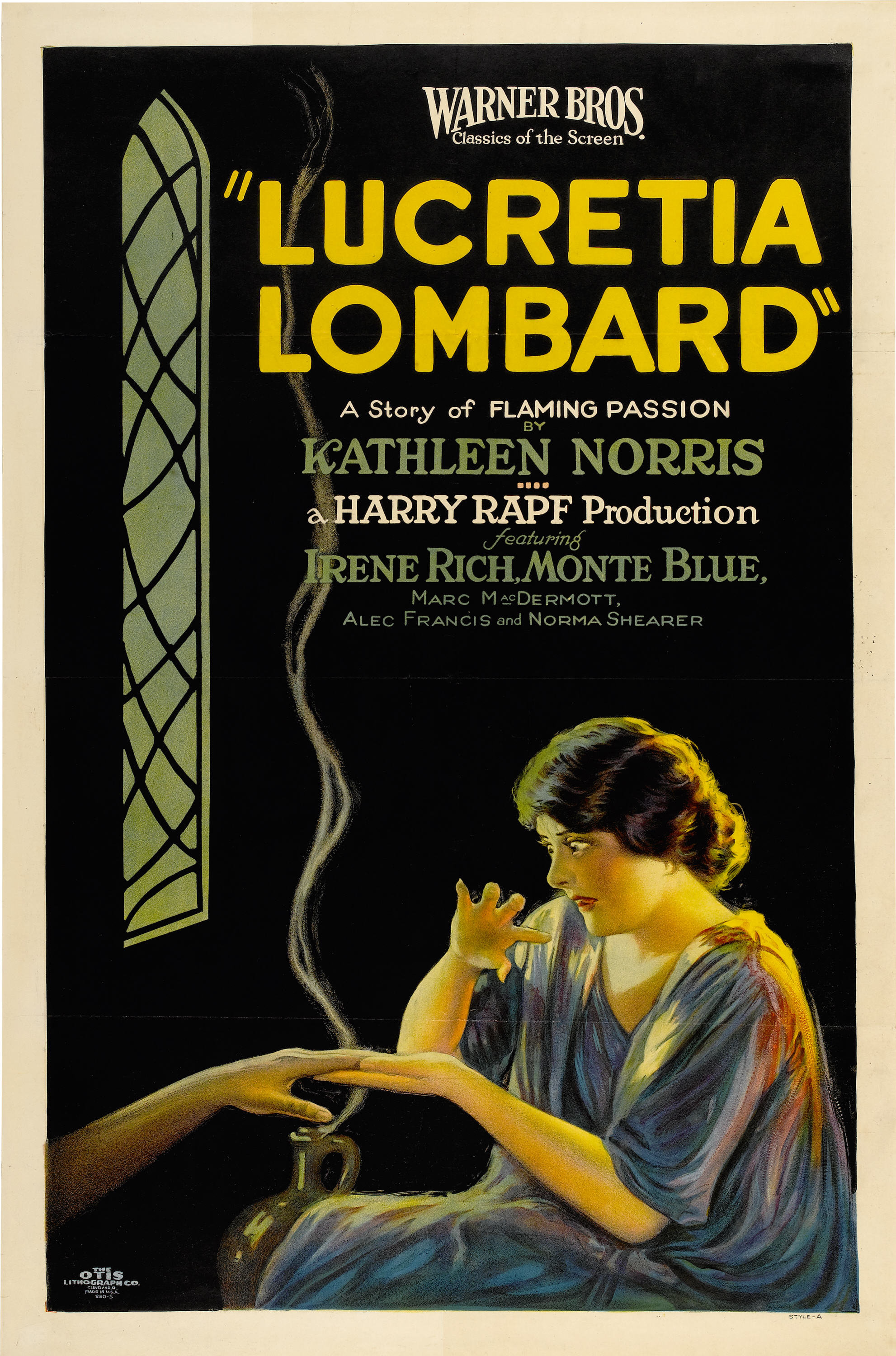
- Movie poster
- Directed by: Jack Conway
- Written by: Scenario: Bertram Milhauser; Sada Cowan
- Based on: Lucretia Lombard by Kathleen Norris
- Produced by: Harry Rapf
- Starring: Irene Rich; Monte Blue; Norma Shearer
- Production company: Warner Bros.
- Distributed by: Warner Bros.
- Release date: December 8, 1923 (limited release)
- Running time: 7 reels
- Country: United States
- Language: Silent (English intertitles)
- Budget: $128,000
- Box office: $385,000

Lucretia Lombard, also known as Flaming Passion, is a 1923 American silent drama film directed by Jack Conway and produced and distributed by Warner Bros. Based upon the 1922 novel of the same name by Kathleen Norris, it stars Irene Rich, Monte Blue, and a young Norma Shearer, just prior to her signing with MGM.

== Cast ==
- Irene Rich as Lucretia Lombard
- Monte Blue as Stephen Winship
- Marc McDermott as Sir Allen Lombard
- Norma Shearer as Mimi
- Alec B. Francis as Judge Winship
- John Roche as Fred Winship
- Lucy Beaumont as Mrs. Winship
- Otto Hoffman as Sandy, Lombard's servant
- Florence Lawrence

== Box office ==
According to Warner Bros records the film earned $348,000 domestically and $37,000 foreign.

== Preservation status ==
Abridged copies of the film still survive at George Eastman House and Pacific Film Archive. It was transferred onto 16mm film by Associated Artists Productions in the 1950s and shown on television.
