= Butterfly (1924 film) =

1924 film by Clarence Brown

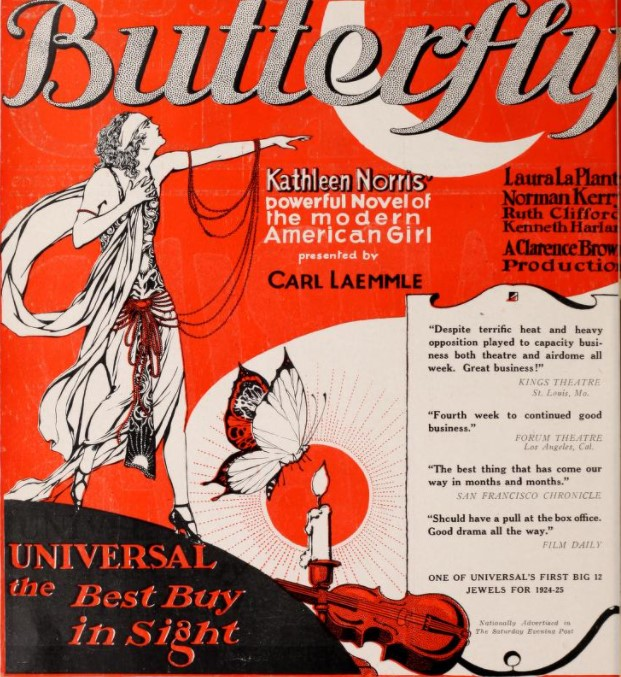
- Advertisement
- Directed by: Clarence Brown
- Written by: Olga Printzlau
- Based on: Butterfly by Kathleen Norris
- Produced by: Carl Laemmle
- Starring: Kenneth Harlan; Laura La Plante; Norman Kerry
- Cinematography: Ben Reynolds
- Distributed by: Universal Pictures
- Release date: October 12, 1924
- Running time: 80 minutes
- Country: United States
- Language: Silent (English intertitles)

Butterfly is an extant 1924 American silent romantic drama film feature, directed by Clarence Brown and starring Kenneth Harlan, Laura La Plante, and Norman Kerry. It was produced and distributed by Universal Pictures. The film was based on the novel by Kathleen Norris.

== Cast ==
- Laura La Plante as Dora Collier
- Ruth Clifford as Hilary Collier
- Kenneth Harlan as Craig Spaulding
- Norman Kerry as Konrad Kronski
- Cesare Gravina as Von Mandescheid
- Margaret Livingston as Violet Van De Wort
- Freeman Wood as Cecil Atherton
- T. Roy Barnes as Cy Dwyer
- Walter Wilkinson as unknown role

== Preservation ==
A print of Butterfly is maintained in the UCLA Film and Television Archive.
