= Västra Karups IF =

Swedish football club

- Full name: Västra Karups Idrottsförening
- Ground: Västra Karups IP; Västra Karup; Sweden
- Chairman: Jens Nygren
- Head coach: Sven-Bertil Bergström (men) and Marco Pettersson (women)
- League: Swedish football Division 4 and 6 for men and 2 and 4 for women Skåne Nordvästra
Home colours

Västra Karups IF is a Swedish football club located in Västra Karup.

== Background ==
Västra Karups IF currently plays in two divisions each for men and women. For men they currently play in Division 4 and 6 Skåne Nordvästra which are the sixth and eighth tier of Swedish football. For women they currently play in Division 2 and 4. They play their home matches at the Västra Karups IP in Västra Karup.

The club is affiliated to Skånes Fotbollförbund.

== Season to season ==
Season	Level	Division	Section	Position	Movements
2006*	Tier 7	Division 5	Skåne Norra	1st	Promoted
2007	Tier 6	Division 4	Skåne Norra	6th	
2008	Tier 6	Division 4	Skåne Norra	3rd	
2009	Tier 6	Division 4	Skåne Västra	7th	
2010	Tier 6	Division 4	Skåne Nordvästra	6th	
2011	Tier 6	Division 4	Skåne Nordvästra	5th	

* League restructuring in 2006 resulted in a new division being created at Tier 3 and subsequent divisions dropping a level.
