= Amos Palmer House (Stonington, Connecticut) =

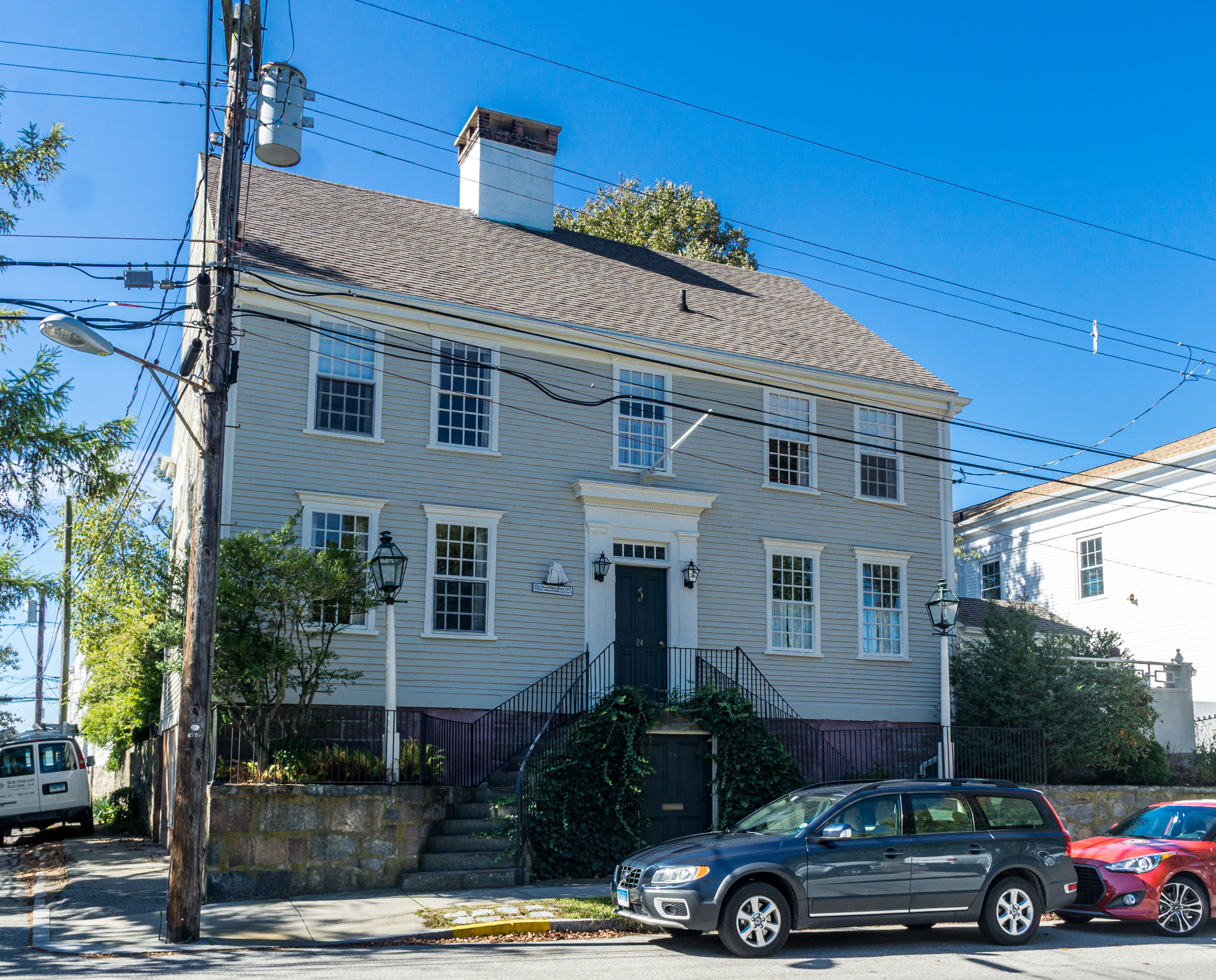
Amos Palmer House in Stonington, Connecticut in October 2017

The Amos Palmer House; is a historic Georgian style home located on Main Street in Stonington, Connecticut. It was built by Captain Amos Palmer in 1787 to replace his former home on the lot which burned after a neighbors' barn caught fire.

The Palmer house was hit by cannon fire between August 9 and 12, 1814 during the War of 1812 from the British ships HMS Ramillies, HMS Pactolus, HMS Dispatch, and HMS Terror under the command of Sir Thomas Hardy. Palmer reputedly took a cannonball which hit his house to Stonington's gunners to fire back at the British.

== Former owners ==
- Amos Palmer (1747-1816), a sea captain and privateer during the American Revolutionary War; the original owner and builder; owned the house until his death on February 18, 1816
- James McNeill Whistler, the artist whose most famous work is the portrait, Whistler's Mother, lived in the home as a child between 1837 and 1840 with his parents George Washington Whistler, an engineer helping to build the Providence to Stonington Railroad, and Anna McNeill Whistler
- Stephen Vincent Benét, the Pulitzer Prize-winning poet and writer bought the house in 1940, and it was owned by his heirs after his death in 1943 until 1983
