= A Child Is Born (radio play) =

1942 radio play by Stephen Vincent Benét

A Child Is Born is a poetic Christmas drama in one act by Stephen Vincent Benét. It was first presented on radio on December 21, 1942, as part of the anthology program Cavalcade of America, the production starred the famous husband-and-wife team of Alfred Lunt and Lynn Fontanne. Later, it began to be presented on television, in productions which starred such actors as Gene Lockhart and Fay Bainter.

Largely written in rhyming verse, the play relates the story of the birth of Christ through the eyes of an innkeeper and his wife. The drama was presented on television many times during the Golden Age of Television, on such anthologies as Actors Studio, Lux Video Theatre, General Electric Theater, and Kraft Television Theatre, but has not been seen on American television since 1956.
