= John Brown's Body (poem) =

Book by Stephen Vincent Benét

John Brown's body lies a-mouldering in the grave.
Spread over it the bloodstained flag of his song,
For the sun to bleach, the wind and the birds to tear,
The snow to cover over with a pure fleece
And the New England cloud to work upon
With the grey absolution of its slow, most lilac-smelling rain,
Until there is nothing there
That ever knew a master or a slave
Or, brooding on the symbol of a wrong,
Threw down the irons in the field of peace.
John Brown is dead, he will not come again,
A stray ghost-walker with a ghostly gun.

— Stephen Vincent Benét, John Brown's Body (1928)

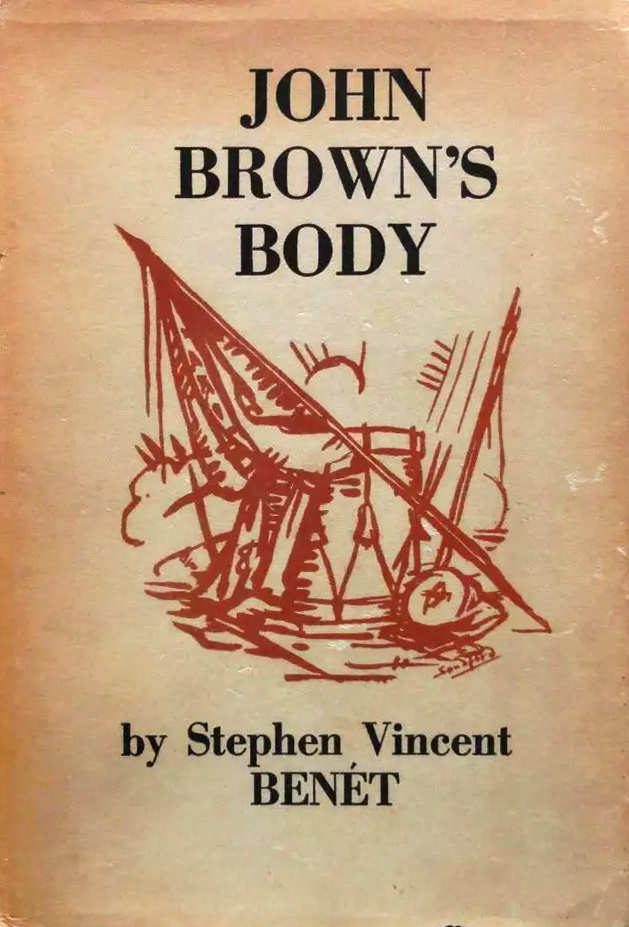
The first edition cover "John Brown's Body", published by Doubleday, Doran

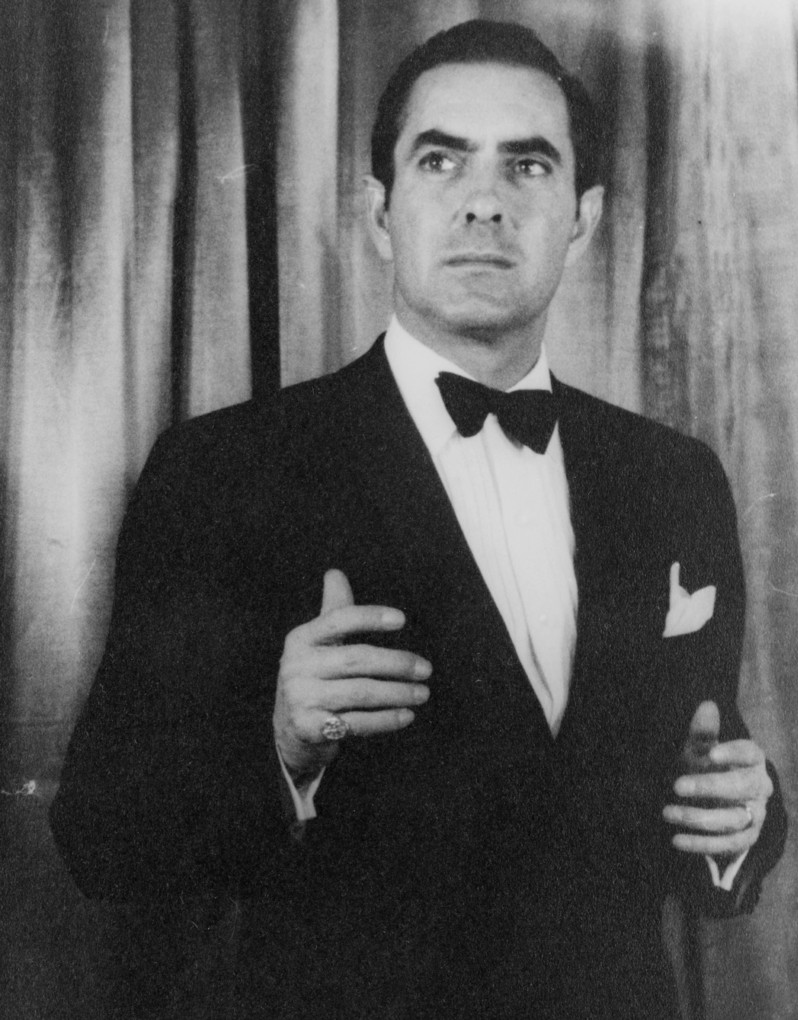
Tyrone Power in the Broadway production in 1953, directed by Charles Laughton

John Brown's Body (1928) is an American epic poem written by Stephen Vincent Benét. The poem's title references the radical abolitionist John Brown, who raided the federal armory at Harpers Ferry, Virginia in October 1859. He was captured and hanged later that year. Benét's poem covers the history of the American Civil War. It won the Pulitzer Prize for Poetry in 1929. It was written while Benét was living in Paris after receiving a Guggenheim Fellowship in 1926.

The poem was performed on Broadway in 1953 in a staged dramatic reading starring Tyrone Power, Judith Anderson, and Raymond Massey, and directed by Charles Laughton.

In 2002, the poem, transformed into a play, was performed in San Quentin State Prison by prisoners. The 2013 documentary film John Brown's Body at San Quentin Prison recounts the story of the production of the play.

In 2015, a recorded performance from 1953 was selected for inclusion in the Library of Congress's National Recording Registry for the recording's "cultural, artistic and/or historical significance to American society and the nation’s audio legacy".
