= Västra Karup =

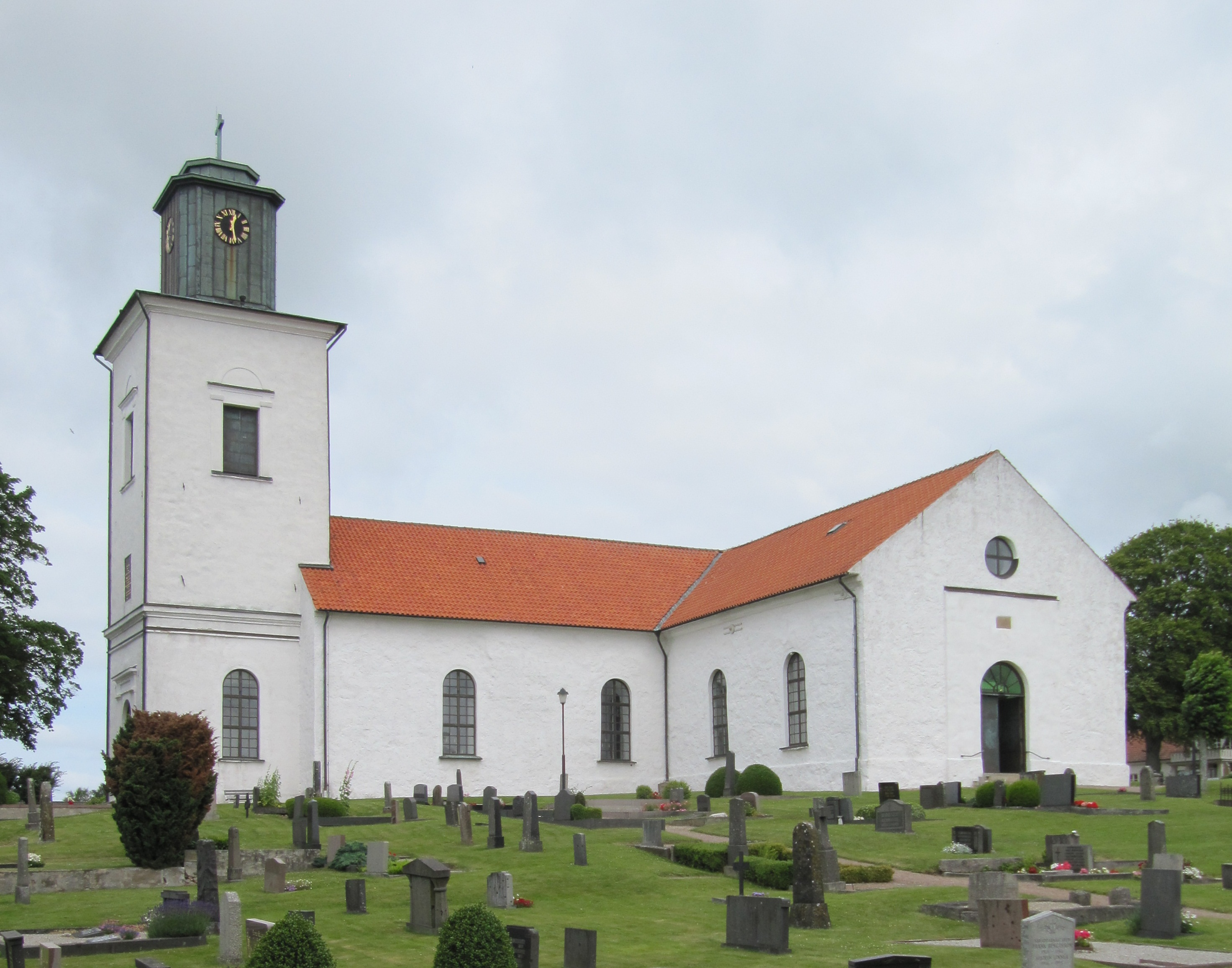
- Västra Karup Church

- Location within Skåne Location within Sweden
- Coordinates: 56°25′N 12°45′E
- Country: Sweden
- Province: Skåne
- County: Skåne County
- Municipality: Båstad Municipality

Area
  - Total: 1.15 km^{2} (0.44 sq mi)

Population (31 December 2010)
  - Total: 582
  - Density: 508/km^{2} (1,320/sq mi)
- Time zone: UTC+1 (CET)
  - Summer (DST): UTC+2 (CEST)

Västra Karup (Swedish pronunciation: [ˈvɛ̌sːtra ˈkɑ̌ːrɵp]) is a locality situated in Båstad Municipality, Skåne County, Sweden with 582 inhabitants in 2010. Birgit Nilsson was born there 1918.

== Sports ==
The following sports clubs are located in Västra Karup:

- Västra Karups IF
