= William Rose Benét =

American writer

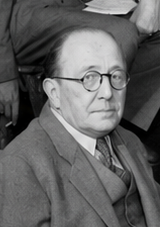
- Born: February 2, 1886; Brooklyn, New York, U.S.
- Died: May 4, 1950 (aged 64); New York City, New York, U.S.
- Education: Yale University (BPhil)
- Occupations: Writer, editor
- Known for: Founder and editor of the Saturday Review of Literature (1924-1950); The Dust Which Is God (1941); The Reader's Encyclopedia (1948)
- Spouses: Teresa Thompson (m. 1912; died 1919) Elinor Wylie (m. 1923; died 1928) Lora Baxter (m. 1932; div. 1937) Marjorie Flack (m. 1941)
- Children: 3, including James Walker Benét
- Relatives: Stephen Vincent Benét (brother)
- Awards: Pulitzer Prize for Poetry (1941)

William Rose Benét (February 2, 1886 – May 4, 1950) was an American poet, writer, and editor. He was the older brother of Stephen Vincent Benét, and the younger brother of Laura Benét.

== Early life and education ==
He was born in Brooklyn, New York, the son of Col. James Walker Benét and his wife, Frances Neill (née Rose), and grandson of Brigadier General Stephen Vincent Benét. He was educated The Albany Academy in Albany, NY and at Sheffield Scientific School of Yale University, graduating with a Ph.B. in 1907. At Yale, he edited and contributed light verse to campus humor magazine The Yale Record.

Benét came to California in 1909 where his father was stationed as a commander of the Benicia Arsenal in Benicia. He arrived at the Carmel-by-the-Sea writers' colony and stayed with, roommate and friend, Sinclair Lewis. Lewis and Benét left Carmel after six months.

== Career ==
He began the Saturday Review of Literature in 1924 and continued to edit and write for it until his death.

In 1942, he was awarded the Pulitzer Prize for Poetry for his book of autobiographical verse, The Dust Which Is God (1941). His brother Stephen Vincent Benét was awarded the same prize two years later in 1944.

Benét is also the author of The Reader's Encyclopedia, a standard American guide to world literature.

Today he is perhaps best known as the author of "The Skater of Ghost Lake," a poem frequently assigned in American schools for its use of onomatopoeia and rhythm as well as its tone of dark mystery.

== Personal life ==
Benét married four times. First, on September 3, 1912, he married Teresa Frances Thompson, with whom he had three children (James Walker Benét (1914-2012), Frances Rosemary Benét, and Kathleen Anne Benét). Teresa died in 1919. Benét's second wife, whom he married on October 5, 1923, was poet Elinor Wylie. She died in 1928. Benét's third wife, whom he married on March 15, 1932, was Lora Baxter. They divorced in 1937. Benét's fourth wife, and widow, was children's writer Marjorie Flack. They were married from June 22, 1941, until his death in 1950.

Benét's son, James Walker Benét, fought in the Abraham Lincoln Brigade and was the author of two suspense novels and a guidebook to the San Francisco Bay Area.

== Works ==
- Merchants of Cathay (1913)
- The Great White Wall: A Poem (1916)
- Perpetual Light: A Memorial (1919)
- Moons of Grandeur: A Book of Poems (1920)
- Dry Points: Studies in Black and White (1921)
- The Flying King of Kurio: A Story of Children (1926)
- Wild Goslings: A Selection of Fugitive Pieces (1927)
- Rip Tide: A Novel in Verse (1932)
- Starry Harness (1933)
- Pocket University: Guide to Daily Reading (1934)
- Golden Fleece: A Collection of Poems and Ballads Old and New (1935)
- Great Poems of the English Language (1936)
- Mother Goose: A Comprehensive Collection of the Rhymes (1936)
- Mad Blake: A Poem (1937)
- Day of Deliverance: A Book of Poems in Wartime (1940)
- The Dust Which is God: A Novel in Verse (1941)
- The Stairway of Surprise: Poems (1947)
- Timothy's Angels, Verse (1947)
- The Reader's Encyclopedia (1948)
- The Spirit of the Scene (1951)
- The First Person Singular (1971)
- The Prose and Poetry of Elinor Wylie (1974)
