= The Miracle of Life (1982 film) =

Documentary film about human reproduction

- Swedish: Sagan om livet
- Directed by: Bo G. Erikson; Carol O. Löfman
- Music by: Anders Berglund
- Country of origin: Sweden
- Original language: Swedish

Production
- Producers: Bo G. Erikson; Carol O. Löfman
- Cinematography: Lennart Nilsson
- Running time: 55 minutes

Original release
- Network: TV2
- Release: 26 November 1982

The Miracle of Life (Swedish: Sagan om livet) is a Swedish documentary film about the human reproductive process. The film won multiple awards including a Peabody and an Emmy (News and Documentary) when it was broadcast as part of the American Public TV series Nova. Photographed by Lennart Nilsson and produced by Bo Erikson and Carol Löfman, the program originally aired in Sweden on November 26, 1982 under the title of Sagan om livet ("The Saga of Life"). The BBC acquired the film as an episode for the documentary series Horizon and aired it that same month. Many scenes were edited and the intro in both the Horizon and Nova versions are different, as well as the ending scene where the baby was born.

The Nova adaptation of the film was broadcast on PBS on February 15, 1983. It was written and produced by Bebe Nixon and narrated by Anita Sangiolo.

A sequel called "Life's Greatest Miracle" aired on November 20, 2001 on PBS using microimagery taken again by Lennart Nilsson with narration by John Lithgow.

== Awards ==
The episode won the following awards:

1984

- American Film Festival Blue Ribbon
- American Film Festival Emily Award
- Ohio State Award
- San Francisco International Film Festival Award

1983

- Emmy Award
- George Foster Peabody Award
- ALA Notable Children's Videos
