= Laura Benét =

American poet (1884–1979)

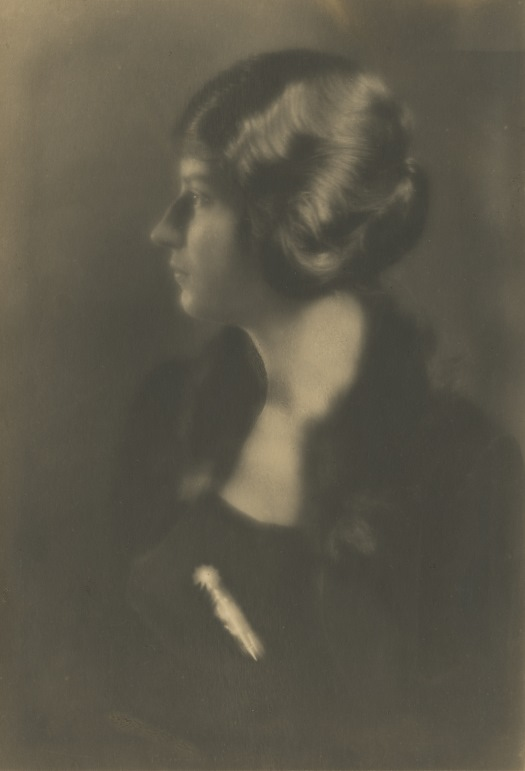
- Portrait of Laura Benet, circa 1910.
- Born: 13 June 1884; Fort Hamilton, Brooklyn, New York
- Died: 17 February 1979 (aged 94); New York
- Resting place: Arlington National Cemetery
- Education: Emma Willard School; Vassar College (A.B.)
- Occupations: Biographer; social worker; newspaper editor
- Relatives: William Rose Benét (brother); Stephen Vincent Benét (brother)

Laura Benét (13 June 1884 – 17 February 1979), was an American social worker, biographer and newspaper editor.

== Early life and education ==
Laura Benét was born at Fort Hamilton, Brooklyn, New York, on June 13, 1884. Her brothers, the writer William Rose Benét and the poet Stephen Vincent Benét, both won the Pulitzer Prize. She graduated from the Emma Willard School in 1903 and, four years later, from Vassar College with an A.B. degree.

== Career ==
Benét was a settlement worker in New York City from 1913 to 1916 and then became an inspector for the Red Cross Sanitary Commission]during World War I.

After the war, she returned home in 1919 to help care for her brother William's three children after the death of his first wife, Teresa Thompson, sister of the novelist Kathleen Thompson Norris, during the 1918 flu pandemic. Benét occasionally wrote for the Literary Review and then began writing biographies for children and adults while working as a newspaper editor for The New York Sun and The New York Times. She mostly wrote literary biographies, including ones on both of her brothers, and also compiled biographies like Famous English and American Essayists. She wrote her memoir, When William Rose, Stephen Vincent, and I Were Young, in 1976.

== Death ==
Benét died in New York on February 17, 1979. She is buried at Arlington National Cemetery with her parents, U.S. Army Colonel James Walker Benét (1857-1928) and Frances Neill Rose Benét (1860-1940).

== Selected works ==
- Fairy Bread, 1921
- Noah's Dove, 1929
- Goods And Chattels, 1930
- The Guinea Pig, 1930 (Note: Published in The Sun)
- Basket for a Fair, 1934
- The Boy Shelley, 1937
- Caleb's Luck, 1938
- The Hidden Valley, 1938
- Enchanting Jenny Lind, 1939
- Roxana Rampant, 1940
- Young Edgar Allan Poe, 1941
- Come Slowly, Eden, 1942
- Washington Irving: Explorer of American Legend, 1944
- Is Morning Sure?, 1947
- Thackeray of the Great Heart and Humorous Pen, 1947
- Barnum's First Circus and Other Stories, 1949
- Famous American Poets, 1950
- Coleridge: Poet of Wild Enchantment, 1952
- Stanley: Invincible Explorer, 1955
- In Love With Time: Poems, 1959
- Famous American Humorists, 1959
- Famous Poets for Young People, 1964
- Horseshoe Nails, 1965
- Famous English and American Essayists, 1966
- Famous Biographies for Young People, 1966
- Washington Irving: Explorer Of American Legend, 1966
- Famous New England Authors, 1970
- The Mystery of Emily Dickinson, 1973
- Bridge of a Single Hair: A Book of Poems, 1974
- When William Rose, Stephen Vincent, and I Were Young, 1976
