= A Child Is Born (book) =

1965 book by Lennart Nilsson

- Cover of 1990 edition
- Author: Lennart Nilsson
- Original title: Ett barn blir till
- Language: English
- Publication date: 1965
- Pages: 156
- ISBN: 0-440-51214-X
- OCLC: 9585107

A Child Is Born (full title: A Child Is Born: The drama of life before birth in unprecedented photographs. A practical guide for the expectant mother; original Swedish title: Ett barn blir till) is a 1965 photographic book by Swedish photojournalist Lennart Nilsson. The book, consisting of 31 chapters and 160 pages, contain photographs charting the development of the human embryo and fetus from conception to birth; it is reportedly the best-selling illustrated book ever published. Nilsson's photographs were originally accompanied by medical text, written by Axel Ingelman-Sundberg and Claes Wirsén, describing prenatal development and offering advice on antenatal care. The images were among the first of developing fetuses to reach a wide popular audience. Their reproduction in the April 30, 1965, edition of Life magazine sparked so much interest that the entire print run of eight million copies sold out within four days; they won Nilsson the American National Press Association Picture of the Year award, and reached a sufficiently iconic status to be chosen for launch into space aboard the NASA probes Voyager 1 and Voyager 2. The book and its images have figured in debates about abortion and the beginning of life, and the book is the subject of a substantial body of feminist critique.

== Synopsis ==
The book proceeds along two "tracks": one series of photographs and accompanying text depict the development of the fetus from conception through to birth; the other shows a woman and her partner as her pregnancy progresses. Early images show sperm proceeding toward an ovum; cell division, implantation, and the development of the embryo are then illustrated. The text accompanying the photographs of the woman supplies some antenatal care advice.

== Reception ==
Life, an American magazine, marked the publication of A Child Is Born by reproducing in its 30 April 1965 edition 16 of the book's photographs. The pictures were run simultaneously in the British Sunday Times and in Paris Match. All eight million printed copies of Life containing the images sold out within four days. The book became reportedly the all-time best-selling illustrated book published; its ubiquity led the academic Barbara Duden to deem it and its pictures "part of the mental universe of our time". Images, text, and diagrams from the book have been reproduced in works as diverse as guides to child protection, development science and anatomy textbooks, and pregnancy manuals. It is widely cited as a pregnancy resource in parenting manuals, and the academic Rebecca Kukla has argued that the book was so culturally influential as to have mediated and to some extent determined the way pregnant women understand their own pregnancies. Images from the book were sent into space aboard the Voyager 1 and Voyager 2 space probes. The American Library Association regards it, alongside Gray's Anatomy, as a core medical reference work for libraries.

The book was often cited as presenting the first images of a live fetus in utero. In fact, Geraldine Flanagan's The First Nine Months Of Life had in 1962 compiled a similar set of fetal images from medical archives.

The images played an important role in debates about abortion and the beginning of human life. Nilsson himself declined to comment on the origins of some of the photographs' subjects, which in fact included many images of terminated and miscarried fetuses: all but one of the images that appeared in Life were of fetuses that had been surgically removed from the womb. Nilsson also refused to be drawn on the question of the point at which life begins, describing himself as a journalist and the debate as one for other authorities. Anti-abortion campaigners perceived and presented the book's images as evidence that a fetus is a well-developed, discrete human person from well before birth. Pro-choice activists, on the other hand, have portrayed the images (and the technology they represent) as evidence of medical and imaging techniques that now allow serious fetal defects to be detected very early and furnish pregnant parents with more information upon which to base choices. Some critics have described as ironic the image's popularity with anti-abortion campaigners who argue that the fetus is a living human, given that many of them depict (surgically or spontaneously) aborted fetuses.

Both the popularity of the images with anti-abortion campaigners and the photographic techniques, which have been described as eliding the presence of the woman in whose womb the fetus is developing, have made the book the subject of substantial feminist critique. Some of these criticisms have addressed the book's language, which often describes the photographs' subjects as "persons" or "babies". Others argue that the focus on the fetus that the book promoted rendered the woman in whose body it was developing invisible and unimportant, or contributed to an atmosphere in which the woman and the fetus were seen as remote, opposite, and in competition with one another for rights and personhood. Others, though, have described Nilsson's book as placing the story of fetal development firmly within the context of the woman's body and life. Some scholars have sought to deconstruct the techniques used and choices made in the images' production, pointing out for example that lighting magnification is used to give month-old fetuses the appearance of a much more viable six-month-old, and lightening techniques used to replace the fetus's deep red skin tone with a "baby-like" pink or gold tone.

== Publishing history ==
By the first decade of the 21st century the book had reached a fourth edition and been published in 20 countries. A CD version of the book was produced in 1994, rendering the images interactive. How Was I Born?, an adaptation of the book's text for children, featured many of the same images.

- Lennart Nilsson (1966). A Child Is Born: The drama of life before birth. Dell. pp. 156. ISBN 0-440-51214-X.
