= Stephen Vincent Benét =

Poet, short story writer, novelist (1898–1943)

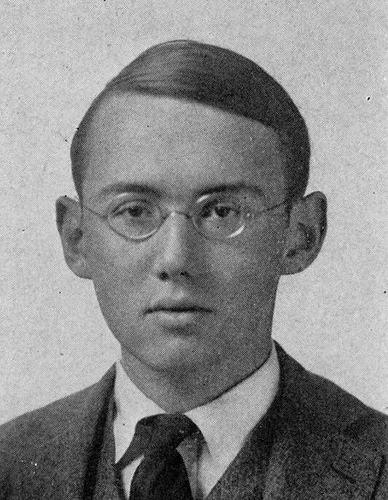
- Benét at Yale College in 1919
- Born: July 22, 1898; Fountain Hill, Pennsylvania, U.S.
- Died: March 13, 1943 (aged 44); New York City, U.S.
- Education: Yale University (BA, MA)
- Occupation: Writer
- Spouse: Rosemary Carr (m. 1921)
- Children: 3
- Relatives: William Rose Benét (brother); Laura Benét (sister)
- Writing career
- Period: 20th century
- Genres: Poetry, short story, novel
- Notable works: John Brown's Body (1929); The Devil and Daniel Webster (1936); By the Waters of Babylon (1937); Seven Brides for Seven Brothers (1954) (adapted from Benét's story The Sobbin' Women)
- Notable awards: Pulitzer Prize for Poetry (1929); O. Henry Award (1937); Pulitzer Prize for Poetry (1944, posthumous)

Stephen Vincent Benét (/bəˈneɪ/ bə-NAY; July 22, 1898 – March 13, 1943) was an American poet, short story writer, and novelist. He wrote a book-length narrative poem of the American Civil War, John Brown's Body, published in 1928, for which he received the Pulitzer Prize for Poetry, and the short stories "The Devil and Daniel Webster", published in 1936, and "By the Waters of Babylon", published in 1937.

In 2009, Library of America selected his story "The King of the Cats", published in 1929, for inclusion in its two-century retrospective of American Fantastic Tales, edited by Peter Straub.

== Early life and education ==
Benét was born on July 22, 1898, in Fountain Hill, Pennsylvania, in the Lehigh Valley region of eastern Pennsylvania to James Walker Benét, a colonel in the U.S. Army, and his wife, Frances Neill (née Rose). Benét was the brother of writers William Rose Benét and Laura Benét. His grandfather and namesake led the Army Ordnance Corps from 1874 to 1891 as a brigadier general and served in the Civil War. His paternal uncle Laurence Vincent Benét was an ensign in the U.S. Navy during the Spanish–American War who later manufactured the French Hotchkiss machine gun.

Around the age of ten, Benét was sent to the Hitchcock Military Academy in San Rafael, California. He graduated at the top of his class from Summerville Academy in Augusta, Georgia, and from Yale University, where he was "the power behind the Yale Lit", according to Thornton Wilder, a fellow member of the Elizabethan Club. As a Yale University student, he also edited and contributed light verse to the campus humor magazine The Yale Record.

His first book was published when he was aged 17, and he was awarded an M.A. in English upon submission of his third volume of poetry in lieu of a thesis. He was also a part-time contributor to Time magazine in the magazine's early years.

In 1920 and 1921, Benét was in France on a Yale traveling fellowship, where he met Rosemary Carr; the couple married in Chicago in November 1921. Carr was also a writer and poet, and they collaborated on some works.

In 1926, he received a Guggenheim Fellowship award and, while living in Paris, wrote John Brown's Body.

== Career ==
Benét helped solidify the place of the Yale Series of Younger Poets Competition and Yale University Press during his decade-long judgeship of the competition. He published the first volumes of James Agee, Muriel Rukeyser, Jeremy Ingalls, and Margaret Walker.

In 1929, Benét was elected a member of the American Academy of Arts and Letters.

Two years later, in 1931, he was awarded a fellowship by the American Academy of Arts and Sciences.

Out of John Brown's strong sinews the tall skyscrapers grow,
Out of his heart the chanting buildings rise,
Rivet and girder, motor and dynamo,
Pillar of smoke by day and fire by night,
The steel-faced cities reaching at the skies,
The whole enormous and rotating cage
Hung with hard jewels of electric light,
Smoky with sorrow, black with splendor, dyed
Whiter than damask for a crystal bride
With metal suns, the engine-handed Age,
The genie we have raised to rule the earth,
Obsequious to our will
But servant-master still,
The tireless serf already half a god --

— Stephen Vincent Benét, "John Brown's Body" (1928)

Benét won the O. Henry Award three times for his short stories: in 1932, for An End to Dreams; in 1937, for The Devil and Daniel Webster; and in 1940, for Freedom's a Hard-Bought Thing.

His fantasy short story "The Devil and Daniel Webster" inspired several unauthorized dramatizations by other writers after its publication, which prompted Benét to adapt his own work for the stage. Benét approached composer Douglas Moore to create an opera of the work with Benét serving as librettist in 1937.

The Devil and Daniel Webster: An Opera in One Act, published by Farrar & Rinehart in 1939, premiered on Broadway that same year. The opera version of Benet's "The Devil and Daniel Webster" was created from 1937 through 1939, and its libretto served as the basis for a 1938 play adaptation of the work, The Devil and Daniel Webster: A Play in One Act, published by Dramatists Play Service in 1938. The play, in turn, was used as the source for a screenplay adaptation co-written by Benét, which was released in 1941 as All That Money Can Buy.

Benét also wrote a sequel, "Daniel Webster and the Sea Serpent", in which Daniel Webster encounters Leviathan.

== Death ==
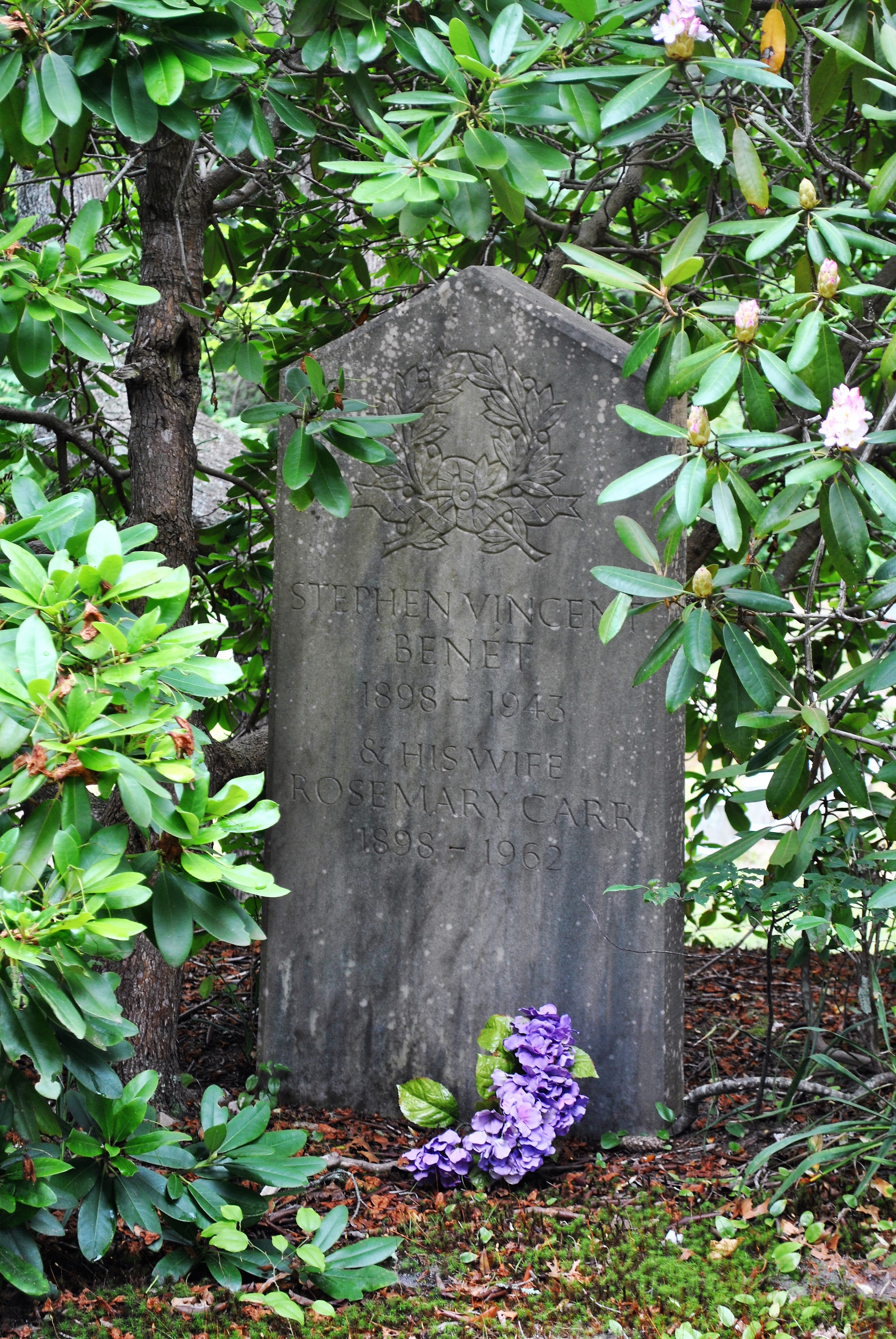
Benét's gravesite at Evergreen Cemetery in Stonington, Connecticut

Benét died of a heart attack in New York City on March 13, 1943, at age 44. He is buried in Evergreen Cemetery in Stonington, Connecticut, where he owned the historic Amos Palmer House.

== Legacy ==
On April 17, 1943, NBC Radio broadcast a special tribute to his life and works, which included a performance by Helen Hayes. He was awarded a posthumous Pulitzer Prize in 1944 for Western Star, an unfinished narrative poem on the settling of the United States.

Benét adapted the Roman myth of the rape of the Sabine Women into the story "The Sobbin' Women". That story was adapted as the musical film Seven Brides for Seven Brothers (1954), then as a stage musical (1978) and then TV series (1982). His play John Brown's Body was staged on Broadway in 1953 in a three-person dramatic reading featuring Tyrone Power, Judith Anderson, and Raymond Massey, directed by Charles Laughton. The book was included in Life magazine's list of the 100 outstanding books of 1924–44.

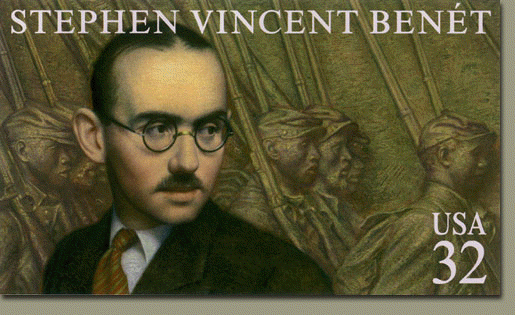
US Postage Stamp

Dee Brown's Bury My Heart at Wounded Knee takes its title from the final phrase of Benét's poem "American Names":

"You may bury my body in Sussex grass,
You may bury my tongue at Champmédy.
I shall not be there. I shall rise and pass.
Bury my heart at Wounded Knee."

The last two lines are used as an epigram at the beginning of Brown's book.

== Selected works ==
- Five Men and Pompey, a series of dramatic portraits, Poetry, 1915
- The Drug-Shop, or, Endymion in Edmonstoun, his Yale University Prize Poem, written in 1917
- Young Adventure: A book of Poems, 1918
- Heavens and Earth, 1920
- The Beginnings of Wisdom: A Novel, 1921
- Young People's Pride: A Novel, 1922
- Jean Huguenot: A Novel, 1923
- The Ballad of William Sycamore: A Poem, 1923
- King David: A two-hundred-line ballad in six parts, 1923
- Nerves, 1924, a play co-authored with John C. Farrar
- That Awful Mrs. Eaton, 1924, a play co-authored with John C. Farrar
- Tiger Joy: A Book of Poems, 1925
- The Mountain Whippoorwill: How Hill-Billy Jim Won the Great Fiddler's Prize: A Poem., 1925
- The Bat, 1926, ghostwritten novelization of the play by Mary Roberts Rinehart and Avery Hopwood
- Spanish Bayonet, 1926
- John Brown's Body, 1928
- The Barefoot Saint: A Short Story, 1929
- The Litter of Rose Leaves: A Short Story, 1930
- Abraham Lincoln, 1930, a screenplay co-authored with Gerrit Lloyd
- Ballads and Poems, 1915–1930, 1931
- A Book of Americans, 1933, co-authored with Rosemary Carr Benét, his wife
- James Shore's Daughter: A Novel, 1934
- The Burning City, 1936, includes 'Litany for Dictatorships'
- The Magic of Poetry and the Poet's Art, 1936
- The Devil and Daniel Webster, 1936
- By the Waters of Babylon, 1937
- The Headless Horseman: one-act play, 1937
- Thirteen O'Clock, 1937
- We Aren't Superstitious, 1937, an essay on the Salem Witch Trials
- Johnny Pye and the Fool Killer: A Short Story, 1938
- Tales Before Midnight: Collection of Short Stories, 1939
- The Ballad of the Duke's Mercy, 1939
- The Devil and Daniel Webster, 1939, an opera libretto with Douglas Moore
- A Song of Three Soldiers, 1940
- Elementals, 1940–41 (broadcast)
- Freedom's Hard-Bought Thing, 1941, a broadcast
- Listen to the People, 1941
- A Summons to the Free, 1941
- William Riley and the Fates, 1941
- Cheers for Miss Bishop, 1941, a screenplay written with Adelaide Heilbron and Sheridan Gibney
- The Devil and Daniel Webster, 1941, a screenplay written with Dan Totheroh
- Selected Works, 1942 (2 vols.) OCLC 22177930
- Short Stories, 1942
- Nightmare at Noon: Short Poem, 1942, in The Treasury Star Parade, edited by William A. Bacher
- A Child is Born, 1942, a broadcast
- They Burned the Books, 1942 OCLC 925056
- They Burned the Books, 1942, a broadcast

These works were published posthumously:

- Western Star, 1943 (unfinished)
- Twenty Five Short Stories, 1943
- America, 1944
- O'Halloran's Luck and Other Short Stories, 1944
- We Stand United, 1945, a series of radio scripts
- The Bishop's Beggar, 1946
- The Last Circle, 1946
- Selected Stories, 1947
- From the Earth to the Moon, 1958
