= Robot Chicken season 4 =

Robot Chicken
- Season 4
- DVD cover
- No. of episodes: 20

Release
- Original network: Adult Swim
- Original release: December 7, 2008 – December 6, 2009

Season chronology
- ← Previous; Season 3 Next → Season 5

The fourth season of the stop-motion television series Robot Chicken originally aired in the United States on Cartoon Network's late night programming block, Adult Swim. Season four officially began on December 7, 2008, on Adult Swim, with "Help Me", and ended with "Dear Consumer" on December 6, 2009, with a total of twenty episodes. Once sorted in production order, the first half of the season's episode titles read out a message of a person named Maurice being trapped in a DVD factory, while the second half of the titles read out a counter message from the factory.

The fourth season was released on the Season Four: Uncensored DVD on December 15, 2009 in Region 1, August 30, 2010 in Region 2 and December 2, 2009 in Region 4.

== Overview ==
The fourth season of Robot Chicken includes many TV, movie, TV commercial, and pop culture parodies, and non-sequitur blackouts, all acted out by dolls and action figures, including parody's like, Tila Tequila reveals a deadly secret, which ends up being that she's a robot, A contractor builds temples for the Indiana Jones movies, Dick Cheney becomes Tony Stark's unexpected ally, the creators imagine a deleted scene from Daredevil, Joey Fatone pitches his idea for a sketch, Strawberry Shortcake solves a robbery, O. J. searches for his ex-wife's killer, Star Trek II: The Wrath of Khan is shown as an opera, the creators imagine what happens when Punky Brewster hits puberty, Criss Angel delivers the Ultimate Mind Freak at Hogwarts, the Creature from the Black Lagoon creates the newest monster-based cereal, Kermit the Frog introduces everyone to his cousin, Annie Warbucks has her Sweet 16, transients begin to wear Clark Kent's clothing, Gyro-Robo add some depth to D&D, Transformers mourn a fallen hero, Batman gets a new look at Two-Face, John Connor gets his first Terminator, the new Bachelor is a beast, and a new spin on Alfred Hitchcock's Rear Window.

== Guest stars ==
Many celebrities have guest starred in the fourth season of Robot Chicken: they include Sarah Michelle Gellar, Mila Kunis, Seth MacFarlane, Katee Sackhoff, Tila Tequila, Joss Whedon, Ronald D. Moore, Sebastian Bach, Alex Borstein, Milo Ventimiglia, Eden Espinosa, Rachael Leigh Cook, Stuart Townsend, Kevin Shinick, Christian Slater, Zac Efron, Donald Faison, Joey Fatone, Rashida Jones, Ron Perlman, Billy Dee Williams, Emmanuelle Chriqui, Amy Smart, Skeet Ulrich, David Faustino, Jim Cummings, Lee Majors, Jon Favreau, Scott Porter, Mark Hamill, Hulk Hogan, Jamie Kaler, Soleil Moon Frye, Nathan Fillion, Jean-Claude Van Damme, Adrianne Palicki, David Hasselhoff, Neil Patrick Harris, Monica Keena, Abraham Benrubi, Simon Pegg, T-Pain, Chace Crawford, Sandra Oh, Spencer Grammer, Joel McHale, Clark Duke, Vanessa Hudgens, James Marsden and Greg Grunberg.

== Episodes ==
| No. overall | No. in season | Title | Directed by | Written by | Original release date | Prod. code |
|---|---|---|---|---|---|---|
| 61 | 1 | "Help Me" | Chris McKay | Hugh Davidson, Mike Fasolo, Seth Green, Geoff Johns, Matthew Senreich, Kevin Shinick & Zeb Wells | December 7, 2008 | 401 |
Robot Chicken returns for its fourth season, with the help of Mutant Enemy Productions founder Joss Whedon, Battlestar Galactica creator Ron Moore and Family Guy creator Seth MacFarlane. Tila Tequila reveals a deadly secret, which ends up being that she's a robot. The creators imagine: What if PaRappa the Rapper had to rap for his life? Movie and TV favorites are trimmed down to "Just the Good Parts". Features contributions by writer Geoff Johns. Cast: Hugh Davidson, Tamara Garfield, Seth Green, Seth MacFarlane, Matthew Senreich, Beverly Staunton, Clark Duke (uncredited), Keith Crofford (uncredited) Guest stars: Ronald D. Moore, Katee Sackhoff, Tila Tequila, Joss Whedon
| 62 | 2 | "They Took My Thumbs" | Chris McKay | Hugh Davidson, Mike Fasolo, Seth Green, Geoff Johns, Matthew Senreich, Kevin Shinick & Zeb Wells | December 14, 2008 | 404 |
A contractor builds temples for the Indiana Jones movies. A salesman has a life-changing accident in the subway. Three days in the life of Jason Voorhees. The Justice League heroes bring their sidekicks to work. Cast: Alex Borstein, Hugh Davidson, Clare Grant, Seth Green, Breckin Meyer, Matthew Senreich Guest stars: Sebastian Bach, Milo Ventimiglia
| 63 | 3 | "I'm Trapped" | Chris McKay | Hugh Davidson, Mike Fasolo, Seth Green, Geoff Johns, Matthew Senreich, Kevin Shinick & Zeb Wells | December 21, 2008 | 402 |
The aftermath of The Adventures of Pluto Nash is shown. Learn about James Bond's sex life. Dick Cheney becomes Tony Stark's unexpected ally. Skeletor plots with an imperfect He-Man clone. Cast: Rachael Leigh Cook, Eden Espinosa, Seth Green, Dan Milano, Cullen Pinney, Adam Reed, Tom Root, Matthew Senreich Guest star: Stuart Townsend
| 64 | 4 | "In a DVD Factory" | Chris McKay | Hugh Davidson, Mike Fasolo, Seth Green, Geoff Johns, Matthew Senreich, Kevin Shinick & Zeb Wells | December 28, 2008 | 403 |
Find out the only way to kill a werewolf! Discover the secret origin of Composite Santa! The creators imagine a deleted scene from Daredevil. Hannah Montana has a date... with murder! Cast: Dana Daurey, Seth Green, Mila Kunis, Seth MacFarlane, Breckin Meyer, Dan Milano, Kevin Shinick, Jamie Kaler (uncredited) Guest star: Christian Slater
| 65 | 5 | "Tell My Mom" | Chris McKay | Mike Fasolo, Seth Green, Breckin Meyer, Matthew Senreich, Kevin Shinick & Zeb Wells | January 4, 2009 | 406 |
Joey Fatone pitches his idea for a sketch. GoBots prove they're no Transformers. The creators imagine where Billy Joel might get his musical inspirations from. SpongeBob is a father. If you have a problem and the A-Team's not available, try calling the B-Team. Cast: Donald Faison, Seth Green, Seth MacFarlane, Tom Root, Matthew Senriech Guest stars: Zac Efron, Joey Fatone, Rashida Jones, Ron Perlman
| 66 | 6 | "P.S. Yes, in That Way" | Chris McKay | Mike Fasolo, Seth Green, Breckin Meyer, Matthew Senreich, Kevin Shinick & Zeb Wells | January 11, 2009 | 410 |
Strawberry Shortcake solves a robbery. Billy Dee Williams goes shopping. The creators imagine what happens when Harry introduces his cousin to the Hendersons. Plus G.I. Joe welcomes a new member. Rated TV-MA. Cast: Doug Goldstein (uncredited), Seth Green, Breckin Meyer, Bill Ratner, Matthew Senreich, Amy Smart Guest stars: Emmanuelle Chriqui, Katee Sackhoff, Skeet Ulrich, Billy Dee Williams
| 67 | 7 | "Love, Maurice" | Chris McKay | Mike Fasolo, Seth Green, Breckin Meyer, Matthew Senreich, Kevin Shinick & Zeb Wells | January 18, 2009 | 409 |
The creators imagine how Babar might rule with an iron tusk. O. J. searches for his ex-wife's killer. What Terminator would Skynet send back in time. Plus, check out the latest superhero movie, Kid Venison. Rated TV-MA. Cast: Bob Bergen, Sarah Michelle Gellar, Seth Green, Mila Kunis, Patrick Pinney, Matthew Senreich, Lisa Sterbakov Guest stars: David Faustino, Lee Majors
| 68 | 8 | "2 Weeks Without Food" | Chris McKay | Hugh Davidson, Mike Fasolo, Seth Green, Geoff Johns, Matthew Senreich, Kevin Shinick & Zeb Wells | January 25, 2009 | 405 |
Discover what happened when Dorothy left the Land of Oz. Star Trek II: The Wrath of Khan is shown as an opera. How would the addition of Little Iron Man to the Avengers team play out? Speed Racer competes in the world of NASCAR. See the latest episode of MTV's The Hills. Cast: Seth Green, Jeanette Baity, Agostino Castagnola, Joe Hanna, Marie Hodgson, Jessica Landon, Adam Reed, Matthew Senreich, George Sterne Guest stars: Jon Favreau, Scott Porter
| 69 | 9 | "But Not in That Way" | Chris McKay | Mike Fasolo, Seth Green, Breckin Meyer, Matthew Senreich, Kevin Shinick & Zeb Wells | February 1, 2009 | 408 |
The Giving Tree has much to give. Everyone loves InuYasha. The creators imagine what happens when Punky Brewster hits puberty. Who might Stephen King's new neighbor be? Black Manta narrates Joker's life in Arkham Asylum in "The Arkham Redemption". Rated TV-MA. Cast: Seth Green, Jamie Kaler, Tom Kane, Seth MacFarlane, Matthew Senreich, Zeb Wells Guest stars: Soleil Moon Frye, Mark Hamill, Hulk Hogan
| 70 | 10 | "I Love Her" | Chris McKay | Mike Fasolo, Seth Green, Breckin Meyer, Matthew Senreich, Kevin Shinick & Zeb Wells | February 8, 2009 | 407 |
The creators imagine how Freddy Krueger got his start. What would happen if the Monchhichis drew first blood? Criss Angel delivers the Ultimate Mind Freak at Hogwarts. The last ingredient to making the Powerpuff Girls is cocaine. See what a day with the Lohans might be like. Rated TV-MA. Cast: Eden Espinosa, Seth Green, Breckin Meyer, Dan Milano, Wendy Shapero Guest stars: Zac Efron, Stuart Townsend
| 71 | 11 | "We Are a Humble Factory" | Chris McKay | Hugh Davidson, Mike Fasolo, Seth Green, Matthew Senreich, Kevin Shinick & Zeb Wells | July 26, 2009 | 412 |
The creators imagine an alternate ending to Armageddon. What would the newest Star Trek character look like? The Creature from the Black Lagoon creates the newest monster-based cereal. You are treated to the excitement that is M.A.S.K.. Meet the WWE's new up and coming challenger. Cast: Hugh Davidson, Tamara Garfield, Seth Green, Lisa Kay Jennings, Breckin Meyer, Adam Reed, Tom Root Guest stars: Nathan Fillion, Triple H
| 72 | 12 | "Maurice Was Caught" | Chris McKay | Mike Fasolo, Seth Green, Hugh Davidson, Matthew Senreich, Kevin Shinick & Zeb Wells | August 2, 2009 | 413 |
Simon Belmont knows what works. Kermit the Frog introduces everyone to his cousin. Jean-Claude just don't give a Van Damme. Annie Warbucks celebrates her super sweet 16. Cast: Hugh Davidson, Seth Green, Tom Root, Matthew Senreich, Stephen Stanton, Victor Yerrid Guest stars: Soleil Moon Frye, Adrianne Palicki, Jean-Claude Van Damme
| 73 | 13 | "Unionizing Our Labor" | Chris McKay | Mike Fasolo, Seth Green, Hugh Davidson, Matthew Senreich, Kevin Shinick & Zeb Wells | August 9, 2009 | 414 |
The C.H.U.D. mashup in CHiPs. Medieval Dukes of Hazzard. The downward spiral of the Libertarian Party. Transients begin to wear Clark Kent's clothing. The creators imagine "Wii Fit: Humping Robot". The frog retaliates to the scorpion and the gerbil with violence. Smurfs engage in war with Snorks. Cast: Alex Borstein, Danny Goldman, Seth Green, Breckin Meyer, Dan Milano, Chad Morgan, Matthew Senreich, Kevin Shinick Guest star: David Hasselhoff
| 74 | 14 | "President Hu Forbids It" | Chris McKay | Mike Fasolo, Seth Green, Hugh Davidson, Matthew Senreich, Kevin Shinick & Zeb Wells | August 16, 2009 | 415 |
The Batmobile loses its wheel, spend a night with Jack Sparrow, witness The Joker's plan backfire, the creators imagine what happens when Chris Hansen can't catch a predator, how Dr. Manhattan’s nudity might be a problem, plus Gyro-Robo adds some depth to D&D. Cast: Eden Espinosa, Seth Green, Breckin Meyer, John Moschitta, Stephen Stanton, Adam Talbott Guest stars: Neil Patrick Harris, Monica Keena
| 75 | 15 | "Due to Constraints of Time and Budget" | Chris McKay | Jordan Allen-Dutton, Mike Fasolo, Seth Green, Matthew Senreich, Kevin Shinick & Erik Weiner | August 23, 2009 | 416 |
Indiana Jones knows when to keep his eyes shut, Transformers mourn a fallen hero, the creators imagine what goes on in a Yellow Submarine, help Morton discover the land of What-Whatville, examine the kind of role-model that Barbie is, and meet the new Transporter. Cast: Abraham Benrubi, Rachael Leigh Cook, Jim Cummings, Keith Ferguson, Tamara Garfield, Seth Green, Kevin Shinick Guest star: Simon Pegg
| 76 | 16 | "The Ramblings of Maurice" | Chris McKay | Jordan Allen-Dutton, Mike Fasolo, Seth Green, Matthew Senreich, Kevin Shinick & Erik Weiner | August 30, 2009 | 417 |
Cereal companies try out a viral video advertising campaign. Batman gets a new look at Two-Face, G.I. Joe celebrates their years in service, the creators imagine what the next Traveling Pants movie might look like, plus a new Dark Crystal for the next generation. Cast: Seth Green, Tom Kane, Breckin Meyer Guest stars: Abbie Cornish, Neil Patrick Harris, T-Pain, Skeet Ulrich, Tay Zonday
| 77 | 17 | "Cannot Be Erased, So Sorry" | Chris McKay | Jordan Allen-Dutton, Mike Fasolo, Seth Green, Matthew Senreich, Kevin Shinick & Erik Weiner | September 6, 2009 | 418 |
John Connor gets his first Terminator. Bullhorns ruin everyone's lives. A new video game comes out. Fantasy Island has some unwanted guests. Cobra Commander tries to order at a drive-thru. The Nerd ends up somewhere over the rainbow. Cast: Abraham Benrubi, Eden Espinosa, Seth Green, Russel Harper, Seth MacFarlane, Matthew Senreich Guest stars: Chace Crawford, Sandra Oh, Simon Pegg
| 78 | 18 | "Please Do Not Notify Our Contractors" | Chris McKay | Jordan Allen-Dutton, Mike Fasolo, Seth Green, Matthew Senreich, Kevin Shinick & Erik Weiner | September 13, 2009 | 419 |
The creators take a skewed look at the Holy Grail. The new Bachelor is a beast. Meet a character who knows how to speed things along. Cast: Seth Green, Breckin Meyer, Tom Root, Matthew Senreich Guest stars: Diora Baird, Spencer Grammer, Joel McHale
| 79 | 19 | "Especially the Animal Keith Crofford!" | Chris McKay | Jordan Allen-Dutton, Mike Fasolo, Seth Green, Matthew Senreich, Kevin Shinick & Erik Weiner | September 20, 2009 | 420 |
The creators imagine the origin of the Wuzzles, what Cloverfield's real intention was, a new spin on Alfred Hitchcock's Rear Window, plus a super sassy season ender. Cast: Doug Goldstein (uncredited), Seth Green, Breckin Meyer, Pat Pinney, Matthew Senreich Guest stars: Diora Baird, Clark Duke, Vanessa Hudgens, James Marsden
| 80 | 20 | "Dear Consumer" "Robot Chicken's Full-Assed Christmas Special" | Chris McKay | Jordan Allen-Dutton, Mike Fasolo, Seth Green, Matthew Senreich, Kevin Shinick & Erik Weiner | December 6, 2009 | 411 |
Thor celebrates Christmas in Asgard, Santa adds Walter PPK to the bad boy list and the creators take a skewed look at The Gift of the Magi. Skits: "Santa Royale", "A Powerful Present", "The Most Beautiful Tree Ever", "How the Humping Robot Saves Christmas?", "Mrs. Claus' Present", "Christmas in Asgard", "The Flight of the Snowflake", "Don't Forget About Terrorism", "The Gift of the Magi", "Comet's Christmas Miracle". Cast: Leah Cevoli, Hugh Davidson, Seth Green, Seth MacFarlane, Breckin Meyer, Matthew Senreich Guest stars: Robin Bain, Erika Christensen, Greg Grunberg Note: This is the last episode to be filmed in 4:3 fullscreen.

== DVD release ==
| Title | Release date | | | Episodes |
| Title | Region 1 | Region 2 | Region 4 | Episodes |
|---|---|---|---|---|
| "Season Four: Uncensored" | December 15, 2009 | August 30, 2010 | December 2, 2009 | 61-80 |
This two disc boxset includes all 20 episodes from Season 4 in production order. The special features include "Chicken Nuggets", a San Diego Comic-Con '08 panel, "Day in the Life", a New York Comic-Con '09 panel, video blogs, "Australia Visit", alternate audio, deleted scenes, deleted animations, and a commentary on all 20 episodes.
