= Robot Chicken season 3 =

Robot Chicken
- Season 3
- DVD cover
- No. of episodes: 20

Release
- Original network: Adult Swim
- Original release: August 12, 2007 – October 5, 2008

Season chronology
- ← Previous; Season 2 Next → Season 4

The third season of the stop-motion television series Robot Chicken originally aired in the United States on Cartoon Network's late night programming block, Adult Swim. Season three officially began on August 12, 2007 on Adult Swim, with "Werewolf vs. Unicorn", and ended with "Chirlaxx" on October 5, 2008, with a total of twenty episodes.

The third season was released on the Season Three: Uncensored DVD on October 7, 2008 in Region 1, January 25, 2010 in Region 2 and December 3, 2008 in Region 4.

== Overview ==
The third season of Robot Chicken includes many television, movie, commercial, and pop culture parodies, as well as non-sequitur blackouts, all acted out by dolls and action figures. These include Governor Arnold Schwarzenegger investigating illegal immigration with Speedy Gonzales, Slowpoke Rodriguez, and Dora the Explorer; Godzilla taking a rookie out for a Training Day; the crew of Battlestar Galactica facing a threat from the FCC; President George W. Bush receiving a gremlin; the SWAT team finally catching Sonic the Hedgehog for speeding; Big Jim trying to score; Barbie and Yasmin of the Bratz going head-to-head on Exposed; and "Inside the Battlefield" revisiting G.I. Joe and Cobra's battle over the Weather Dominator twenty years later. Other segments feature Spawn facing the Devil with his one true skill—fiddling; Michael Moore investigating what happened to the girls' toys of yesteryear; Crystar the Crystal Warrior getting high; Wonder Woman revealing her revealing arch-enemy; She-Ra struggling to get a moment of peace as Etheria is constantly under attack while she suffers from period pains; Hermey the Elf being terrible at being a dentist; a nerd being stuffed into a locker and transported to the magical and confusing land of Narnia; the Super Friends making way for the Super Pets; Conan the Barbarian explaining "What Is Best in Life" through song; Sylar gaining a new power in a Heroes parody; Bronson Pinchot and Ludacris starring in the Off-Broadway production of "Don't Be Ridiculous"; and the government attempting to contain an outbreak of cooties while the enemies of America are on the run and President Bush becomes... Captain Texas!

== Guest stars ==
Many celebrities have guest starred in the third season of Robot Chicken: they include Sarah Michelle Gellar, Mila Kunis, Kelly Hu, Cee Lo Green, Snoop Dogg, Kristin Chenoweth, Tahmoh Penikett, Katee Sackhoff, Joss Whedon, Michelle Trachtenberg, Ginnifer Goodwin, Rachael Leigh Cook, Donald Faison, Seth MacFarlane, Hayden Panettiere, Patrick Warburton, Candace Bailey, Kevin Connolly, Rosario Dawson, Jamie Kaler, Skeet Ulrich, Masi Oka, Mark Hamill, Adrianne Palicki, Abraham Benrubi, Amy Smart, Billy Dee Williams, Matthew Lillard, Jean Smart, Alex Borstein, Nathan Fillion, Joel McHale, Robin Tunney, Emma Caulfield, George Lowe, Mark-Paul Gosselaar, Mario López, Lark Voorhies, Dennis Haskins, Dustin Diamond, Zachary Quinto, Clark Duke, Michael Chiklis, Emmanuelle Chriqui, Chris Evans, Ludacris, Julian McMahon, Master P, Matthew Wood, Linda Cardellini, John C. McGinley and Sir Mix-a-Lot.

== Episodes ==
No. overall	No. in season	Title	Directed by	Written by	Original release date	Prod. code
41	1	"Werewolf vs. Unicorn"	Chris McKay	Seth Green, Mike Fasolo, Matthew Senreich, Kevin Shinick & Zeb Wells	August 12, 2007	301
All the people killed in the 2nd season finale return as zombies. The Defenders of the Earth accept their limitations. Shout On and Shout Off with The Shouter. The Decepticon Soundwave discovers he’s a little dated. People can lose at The Game of Life. Governor Arnold Schwarzenegger investigates the illegal immigration issue with Speedy Gonzales and Dora the Explorer. Skits: "Seth's Revenge", "Fantasy Island", "Defenders of the Earth", "Snork Tubes", "The Shouter", "The Sad Fate of Soundwave", "Gyro-Robo News Hour", "Fraternity Shake", "You Like Basketball?", "Naming the Animals", "The Game of Life", "Sleestak Library", "Illegal Alien Problems" Cast: Seth Green, Mila Kunis, Breckin Meyer, Pat Pinney, Tom Root, Matthew Senreich, Frank Welker Guest stars: Keith Crofford, Mike Lazzo
42	2	"Squaw Bury Shortcake"	Chris McKay	Seth Green, Mike Fasolo, Matthew Senreich, Kevin Shinick & Zeb Wells	August 19, 2007	303
The MythBusters team tackles masturbation myths. G-Force’s Tiny needs to shed a few pounds. Popeye’s friends hold an intervention over his addiction to spinach. Godzilla takes a rookie out for a Training Day. Tablesmasher attempts to defeat The Council of Evil Tables. Dirty Harry deals with a punk that does feel lucky. After retirement, Bob Barker handles the neutering personally. Skits: "Where Did He Touch You?", "Tiny's Big Problem", "Masturbation MythBusters", "Isaac Newton's First Reaction", "Are You Timmy?", "Run Forrest, Run", "Popeye Intervention", "King of the Monsters", "New Ghost Rider", "Council of Evil Tables", "Give a Mouse a Cookie", "Feel Lucky, Punk?", "Your Mom Says", "Bob Barker's New Gig" Cast: Seth Green, Jonathan Lipow, Tom Root Guest stars: Kristin Chenoweth, Dave Coulier, CeeLo Green, Ethan Hawke, Kelly Hu, Snoop Dogg
43	3	"Rabbits on a Roller Coaster"	Chris McKay	Seth Green, Mike Fasolo, Matthew Senreich, Kevin Shinick & Zeb Wells	August 26, 2007	304
Randy experiences cross-dressing as the Pink Ranger and death in The Worst Halloween. The crew of Battlestar Galactica defeats the FCC threat. Dick Tracy earns his name. Behold, the newest adventure of Turbo Teen. M.A.S.K.’s Matt Tracker takes a bride. Skits: "Elf Tree Rampage", "The Worst Halloween", "Gavel Whacking", "Frakking Galactica", "The Last Unicorn", "Turbo Teen", "Chocolate Easter Eggs", "Dick Tracy's a Dick", "The Worst School Day", "Charlotte's New Web", "Follow the Light, Rainbow", "Put a M.A.S.K. On It", "Mutant Enemy Insanity" Cast: Candace Bailey, Seth Green, Chad Morgan, Tom Root Guest stars: Michael Hogan, Gregory Itzin, Tahmoh Penikett, Katee Sackhoff, Joss Whedon
44	4	"Tapping a Hero"	Seth Green & Chris McKay	Seth Green, Mike Fasolo, Matthew Senreich, Kevin Shinick & Zeb Wells	September 2, 2007	305
Law & Order has never been chickenfied till now. President George W. Bush receives a gremlin. Don't miss The 33rd Year Old Virgin starring Jesus Christ. Smokey Bear remembers how he got his name. Stan Lee and Pamela Anderson reveal superhero gossip on "Superheroes Tonight."; Skits: "Delicious Gummy Bears", "There's Something on the Wing", "Chicken Room", "George W. Gremlin", "I've Fallen and I Can't Get Up to Stop You", "The 33 Year Old Virgin", "Toss to the Death", "The Origin of Smokey", "Superheroes Tonight", "The Origin of The Watcher and The Shocker" Cast: Ginnifer Goodwin, Seth Green, Breckin Meyer, Chad Morgan, Tom Root Guest stars: Stan Lee, Michelle Trachtenberg
45	5	"Shoe"	Chris McKay	Seth Green, Mike Fasolo, Harp Pekin, Ben Schwartz, Matthew Senreich & Kevin Shinick	September 9, 2007	306
Ted Kennedy and Jenna Jameson battle celebrities in politics and porn! Link's looking for a decent reward from Princess Zelda. The Homeless airlines sorta take flight. The SWAT Team finally "gets" Sonic the Hedgehog for speeding. Learn whatever happened to the Micro Machines Man. Skeletor's latest plot to destroy Eternia and He-Man goes a little too well. Skits: "Bedroom Dysfunction", "Ted and Jenna's Rampage", "Micro Machines Man's Life", "Bungie Snack", "The Tortoise, The Hare and the Ugly", "Rescuing Zelda", "Straitjacket Escape", "Mona Lisa's Smile", "Stopping Sonic", "The Lagoon Creature's Name", "The Sectaurs' Final Mission", "Homeless Airlines", "Hernia Check", "Million Dollar Direct TV Baby", "The Humping Robot Goes Vegas", "The Death of He-Man" Cast: Candace Bailey, Rachael Leigh Cook, Seth Green, Dan Milano, Pat Pinney, Tom Root Guest stars: John Moschitta Jr., Mindy Sterling
46	6	"Endless Breadsticks"	Chris McKay	Seth Green, Mike Fasolo, Harp Pekin, Ben Schwartz, Matthew Senreich & Kevin Shinick	September 16, 2007	307
Another black man in a fat suit movie. Big Jim tries to score. The Cat in the Hat has his way with the family pet and the kids need to get lost. Doug tells us about his life. When Snarf kicks it, Mumm-Ra sees his chance to destroy the ThunderCats as Lion-O's new nanny. Skits: "Like a Mirror", "Giant Fat Black Suit Movie", "Puppet Problems", "Big Jim!", "Pound Puppies For Sale", "Mercenary", "Riddler's Home Life", "Full Moon Tonight", "Doug at a Bar", "Screw Youssical the Musical", "Mumm-Ra Is Mrs. Mumbletipeg", "Ma-Mutt Is Hungry" Cast: Leah Cevoli, Donald Faison, Seth Green, Seth MacFarlane, Tom Root Guest stars: Hayden Panettiere, Patrick Warburton
47	7	"Yancy the Yo-Yo Boy"	Matthew Senreich	Seth Green, Mike Fasolo, Harp Pekin, Ben Schwartz, Matthew Senreich & Kevin Shinick	September 23, 2007	308
The dinosaurs face their Armageddon. Barbie and Yasmin (of the Bratz) go head-to-head on MTV's Exposed. What happens on Tuesday when Wimpy has to pay for his burgers? The Greatest American Hero or greatest American nerd? Find out how infinite wealth has affected Richie Rich's teenage years. Skits: "And Relax", "Dinosaur Armageddon", "This is Going to Hurt Me", "Barbie Exposed", "Stand For the Anthem", "Bride of Beetlejuice", "Robin Hood Wins and Loses", "I'd Gladly Pay You Tuesday", "Greatest American Nerd", "Fred Flintstone's Brake Pads", "Richie Rich's Crib" Cast: Candace Bailey, Michael Benyaer, Eden Espinosa, Seth Green, Breckin Meyer, Tom Root Guest stars: Dave Coulier, Robert Culp
48	8	"More Blood, More Chocolate"	Chris McKay	Seth Green, Mike Fasolo, Harp Pekin, Ben Schwartz, Matthew Senreich & Kevin Shinick	September 30, 2007	309
An alien invasion isn't quite what it seems. Haunted houses are common, but not one with THIS kind of ghost! Can Bob the Builder take on the union? Probably. Inside the Battlefield revisits G.I. Joe's and Cobra's battle of the Weather Dominator, twenty years later. Skits: "And How Did That Joke Make You Feel?", "Unplanned Invasion", "Rape Ghost", "Sleepy Kitty", "Timber!", "Bob the Union Scab", "Monster Realty", "My Name Is Sonny", "Next Stop, Lonelyville", "Pee Wee's Secret Word", "G.I. Joe's Fight for the Weather" Cast: Tamara Garfield, Seth Green, Jamie Kaler, Breckin Meyer, Tom Root Guest stars: Kevin Connolly, Rosario Dawson, Skeet Ulrich
49	9	"Celebutard Mountain"	Chris McKay	Seth Green, Mike Fasolo, Breckin Meyer, Matthew Senreich & Kevin Shinick	October 7, 2007	311
Our PS3 Contest winner gets what's coming to him. Mr. Rogers is turning Japanese. Spawn faces the Devil with his one true skill - fiddling. Fonzie takes care of Chachi the best he can in The Pursuit of Happy Days. Iron Man's feet become his greatest weakness. VH1's "Top 100 Final Episodes" features the end of Edna's Edibles, The PJ's, Mork & Mindy, The Incredible Hulk, The Love Boat and more. Skits: "The PS3 Big Winner", "Joust Ruminations", "Japanese Mr. Rogers", "The Comedy of Science", "Death in Operation", "Spawn Went Down to Georgia", "Have Some Self Respect!", "The Big Bad Cross Dressing Wolf", "Everybody Hates Christ", "The Pursuit of Happy Days", "New Tunes on the Radio", "Iron Man's Coming", "Top 100 Final Episodes Ever" Cast: Sarah Michelle Gellar, Seth Green, Jamie Kaler, Breckin Meyer, Tom Root, Adam Talbott Guest stars: Mark Hamill, Masi Oka
50	10	"Moesha Poppins"	Seth Green	Seth Green, Mike Fasolo, Breckin Meyer, Matthew Senreich & Kevin Shinick	October 21, 2007	312
The Empire Strikes Back's Lando Calrissian led our heroes into a dinnertime trap with Darth Vader, and hilarity's the main course! In the spirit of 300 comes 1776. Michael Moore uncovers whatever happened to the girls' toys of yesteryear. Skits: "Word Fun!", "Not One More Day!", "Are You Not Entertained?", "Milk Sacks", "Baby Hostages", "Aw, Dad", "Dinner With Vader", "1776", "Robotic Longevity", "Girl Toys" Cast: Abraham Benrubi, Keith Ferguson, Seth Green, Breckin Meyer, Tom Root, Amy Smart Guest stars: Malcolm McDowell, Adrianne Palicki, Billy Dee Williams Title reference: A mashup title of the TV sitcom Moesha and the movie Mary Poppins.
51	11	"Ban on the Fun"	Chris McKay & Matthew Senreich	Seth Green, Mike Fasolo, Breckin Meyer, Matthew Senreich & Kevin Shinick	October 28, 2007	313
The Maytag Man helps out...with his life. Crystar the Crystal Warrior gets smoked. Thelma & Louise regret their suicidal ways. The Maytag Repairman's life really sucks. The Laff-A-Lympics gang faces their darkest games ever: Munich, 1972. Skits: "Straight From Hello Kitty's Mouth", "This. Is. Decaf!", "A Modest Proposal", "Cut Me, Mick", "This. Isn't. Funny!", "Thelma & Louise: After the Fadeout", "This. Is. Martha!", "Scientist Mad With Power", "Eat Lightning and Crap Thunder", "Crystar the Crystal Meth Warrior", "This. Is. Scrumptious!", "The Home Life of the Maytag Repairman", "Laff-A-Munich" Cast: Candace Bailey, Seth Green, Breckin Meyer, Dan Milano, Kevin Shinick, Victor Yerrid Guest stars: Matthew Lillard, Jean Smart
52	12	"Losin' the Wobble"	Chris McKay	Seth Green, Mike Fasolo, Breckin Meyer, Matthew Senreich & Kevin Shinick	November 4, 2007	314
The Kool-Aid Man quenches some inconvenient thirsts. The mystery of why Encyclopedia Brown's parents aren't getting along. Wonder Woman reveals her revealing arch-enemy. Drunk celebrities are revealed to be reptilian-like aliens, referencing the 1983 made-for-television science fiction movie V. Skits: "Kool Aid in Space", "Mr. Potato Head's Morning Routine", "Encyclopedia Brown and the Missing Balls", "It's The Law, Asshole!", "Kool Aid in Zombie Wasteland", "Michael Jackson's Giant Dancing Robot", "Encyclopedia Brown's Solution", "Hansel & Gretel's Revenge", "Ray Charles in Charge", "Reverse Villains", "Kool Aid in the Open", "V: The Celebrity Rehab Invasion" Cast: Abraham Benrubi, Alex Borstein, Seth Green, Tom Kane, Jordan Ladd, Breckin Meyer, Tom Root Guest star: Nathan Fillion
53	13	"Slaughterhouse on the Prairie"	Chris McKay	Seth Green, Mike Fasolo, Breckin Meyer, Matthew Senreich & Kevin Shinick	November 11, 2007	315
She-Ra cannot get a moment of peace as Etheria is constantly under attack while she suffers from period pains. The Grease Gang create a new hump machine. The Magic Garden discovers that the story box has a biblical story they will never forget. Lego goes Babel! The Smurfs Village is ravaged by a hurricane. Skits: "Sorry About AIDS", "She-Ra's Aunt Flo", "Dry Cleaner of Death", "Hump Lightning", "Raiders of the Magic Garden", "Pinhead's New Look", "Intensive Care Bears", "Humping Robot's Happy Ending", "I Got It!", "Lego Babel", "Look At The Baby!", "Smurf-tastrophe!", "The Emmy Award Winning Robot Chicken" Cast: Eden Espinosa, Danny Goldman, Seth Green, Dan Milano, Tom Root, Kevin Shinick Guest stars: Joel McHale, Robin Tunney Title reference: A pun on the popular TV series Little House on the Prairie.
54	14	"Robot Chicken's Half-Assed Christmas Special"	Matthew Senreich	Seth Green, Mike Fasolo, Harp Pekin, Ben Schwartz, Matthew Senreich & Kevin Shinick	December 9, 2007	310
Hermey the Elf sucks at being a dentist, The Nerd is stuffed into a locker and into the magical and confusing land of Narnia. All Sally wants is a love note, but for Linus it's misery. Skits: "Hermey's Dentistry", "I Saw Mommy Kissing Santa Claus", "Born In a Manger", "Lighting Up the Christmas Lights", "The Lion, the Witch and the Locker", "Office Christmas Parties", "Misery, My Sweet Babboo", "Little Drummer Goku" Cast: Mike Fasolo, Seth Green, George Lowe, Seth MacFarlane, Katelin Peterson, Tom Root Guest stars: Emma Caulfield, Zachary Gordon
55	15	"Tubba-Bubba's Now Hubba-Hubba"	Chris McKay	Seth Green, Mike Fasolo, Breckin Meyer, Matthew Senreich & Kevin Shinick	April 1, 2008 (April Fools Sneak Peek); July 4, 2008 (Episode's Premiere)	302
The Super Friends make way for The Super Pets. The Carmen Sandiego host has girlfriend troubles. Pac-Man learns that he’s been living in The Matrix. The car version of Voltron gets to the rescue as fast as it can. The Cenobites guest star on Girls Gone Wild. 24 focuses on the night hours as Drac takes down the terrorists. Skits: "Vampire 7:00-8:00AM", "Superpets", "Pringles Fever", "Voltron Force Assemble!", "Dr. Pepper", "Planet of the Ape", "Bear Takes a Bullet", "Pool Clog", "Pac-Matrix", "Vampire 1:00-2:00PM", "Mouse Pardon", "Where In Time Is My Broken Heart", "It Happened In Battle", "Girls Gone Wild: Cenobitches", "Vampire 8:00-9:00PM" Cast: Seth Green, Mocean Melvin, Breckin Meyer, Dan Milano, Tom Root, Kevin Shinick Guest star: Mindy Sterling Note: This episode aired on Adult Swim as an April Fools' Day prank for a sneak peek of upcoming shows, before its official premiere on the broadcast night of July 4.
56	16	"Boo Cocky"	Chris McKay	Seth Green, Hugh Davidson, Mike Fasolo, Matthew Senreich & Erik Weiner	September 7, 2008	316
Conan the Barbarian tells us "What is Best in Life" with a song. The Nerds find out Revenge comes with a price. President Jenna Bush trades the Oil Crisis for the Corn Crisis. The Saved by the Bell kids meet Jigsaw from Saw, and Screech will never be the same. The Borg track the Enterprise to its hiding place—Las Vegas’ Star Trek Experience. Skits: "Private Dumbass", "Revenge Is Best Served For Life", "Conan's Song", "Carrot Attacks", "The Real Star Trek Experience", "Farting and Retards", "Do Ya See the Problem Here?", "Rosie's Toes", "Sawed by the Bell" Cast: Hugh Davidson, Seth Green, Breckin Meyer, Chad Morgan Guest stars: Robert Carradine, Dustin Diamond, Mark-Paul Gosselaar, Dennis Haskins, Mario Lopez, Lark Voorhies
57	17	"Bionic Cow"	Chris McKay	Seth Green, Hugh Davidson, Mike Fasolo, Matthew Senreich & Erik Weiner	September 14, 2008	317
Sylar gets a new power in a Heroes parody. Behind the scenes of Excitebike. Mr. Magoo gets Laser Eye Surgery. Tarzan learns that not everything humans can teach him are as good as Jane’s boobs. When Paris Hilton was stuck in prison, it was up to Nicole Richie to stage a Prison Break. Skits: "Einstein, Mofo", "Excitebike", "Uncle Glen", "Mr. Magoo's Final View", "Those Boobs", "I Wonder Where The Ocean Is Going", "We Find the Defendant", "Virtue City", "Baby vs. Puppy", "Lincoln Gets a Good Ass-Kicking In", "Paris and Nicole's Prison Break" Cast: Hugh Davidson, Seth Green, Mila Kunis, Breckin Meyer, Erik Weiner Guest stars: Clark Duke, Zachary Quinto
58	18	"Monstourage"	Chris McKay	Seth Green, Hugh Davidson, Mike Fasolo, Matthew Senreich & Erik Weiner	September 21, 2008	318
Vic Mackey from The Shield switches places with the Fantastic Four’s Thing, which references Michael Chiklis as he portrays both. Cowboys on a cattle drive have it bad in biblical proportions. Bronson Pinchot and Ludacris star in the off-Broadway production of Don't Be Ridiculous. Fraggle Rock meets Watership Down when the Fraggles are forced out of their home and onto a desperate hunt for survival. Skits: "This Will Only Hurt For a Second", "Insert SHIELD Joke Here", "The Battle of Hastings", "Vibratron", "Poppa Bear Pooper Party", "I Hate You, Grandma", "Frozen Pissball Emergency", "Don't Be Ridiculous", "Bad Crossing Guard", "Watership Fraggle" Cast: Seth Green, Drew Massey, Rachael Leigh Cook Guest stars: Michael Chiklis, Emmanuelle Chriqui, Chris Evans, Ludacris, Julian McMahon
59	19	"President Evil"	Chris McKay	Seth Green, Hugh Davidson, Mike Fasolo, Matthew Senreich & Erik Weiner	September 28, 2008	319
Diggers have Dug their own grave, Dig Dug-style, ya dig? You’ve never seen a Vegas crime caper like Ocean’s Thirty-Eight. The government tries to contain an outbreak of cooties. Teenagers are exposed to movie trailers, but they’re not exactly watching the screen. Rated TV-MA. Skits: "I'm Einstein, Bitch", "Dig Dug", "Dolly Hates You Too", "Ocean's Thirty-Eight", "I Want the Peanut Brittle", "We Own Tiger", "I'd Get That Eye Checked", "Cooties", "Hole in the Bucket", "Michael Bay Presents: Explosions!", "Ford: The Movie", "Young Black People on a Rhythm Team", "Ram-Boo-Boo", "2001, But with Boobs", "Robot Chicken: The Credits: The Movie" Cast: Candace Bailey, Rachael Leigh Cook, Seth Green, Dan Milano, Victor Yerrid Guest stars: Robin Bain, Master P, Adrianne Palicki, Matthew Wood Title reference: A pun on Resident Evil, the popular video game franchise.
60	20	"Chirlaxx"	Seth Green	Seth Green, Hugh Davidson, Mike Fasolo, Matthew Senreich & Erik Weiner	October 5, 2008	320
The latest Japanese commercial for a yeast infection cream needs a famous pitch-woman. The enemies of America are on the run as President Bush becomes…Captain Texas! Sir Mix-a-Lot knows what King Arthur needs! A Glo Worm saves the day when a blackout strikes. We dedicate the season to the staff we’ve lost…and killed. Skits: "Yeast-B-Gone", "Ice Cream Man", "Captain Texas Is Coming", "Celebrity Double Dare", "Fridge Beam", "I Regret", "Space Pirate Monkey From Pluto!", "Table Be Round", "Uh, This Is a Pickle", "Glo Worm", "In Memoriam" Cast: Sarah Michelle Gellar, Seth Green, Breckin Meyer, Tom Root, Matt Senreich Guest stars: Linda Cardellini, Clark Duke, John C. McGinley, Sir Mix-a-Lot

== DVD release ==
Title	Release date			Episodes
Title	Region 1	Region 2	Region 4	Episodes
"Season Three: Uncensored"	October 7, 2008	January 25, 2010	December 3, 2008	41-60
This two disc boxset includes all 20 episodes from Season 3 in production order. This DVD is uncensored except for the "Cat in the Hat" sketch from the episode "Endless Breadsticks" on Disc 1. It also has the "Law & Order: KFC" sketch intentionally censored in the episode "Tapping a Hero". This DVD has special features such as deleted scenes and animatics. It also includes commentary for all of the episodes and has "Chicken Nuggets" commentary for episodes 1 and 3-5. The bonus features also include a gag reel and audio takes.
