= Robot Chicken season 2 =

Robot Chicken
- Season 2
- DVD cover
- No. of episodes: 20

Release
- Original network: Adult Swim
- Original release: April 2 – November 19, 2006

Season chronology
- ← Previous; Season 1 Next → Season 3

The second season of the stop-motion television series Robot Chicken originally aired in the United States on Cartoon Network's late night programming block, Adult Swim. Season two officially began on April 2, 2006 on Adult Swim, with "Suck It!", and ended with "Book of Corrine" on November 19, 2006, with a total of twenty episodes.

The second season was released on the Season Two: Uncensored DVD on September 4, 2007 in Region 1, September 28, 2009 in Region 2 and November 11, 2007 in Region 4.

== Overview ==
The second season of Robot Chicken continues to follow the titular character as he is forced to watch hours of various sketches. This season includes many TV, movie, TV commercial, and pop culture parodies, and non-sequitur blackouts, all acted out by dolls and action figures, including parodies such as: Mexico builds its greatest hero in "The Six Million Peso Man", a time-traveler wreaks havoc on history in "Dicks with Time Machines", Fred and Barney brawl over a box of Fruity Pebbles, Lindsay Lohan enters the world of Highlander and battles (and decapitates) teen starlet foes, such as Amanda Bynes and Hilary Duff, a cleaning woman finds the Batcave the hard way, popular board games from Chutes and Ladders to Hungry Hungry Hippos get turned into action-packed feature films, A checkers champion goes on the adventure of a lifetime, the Senior Mutant Ninja Turtles rock the nursing home, monkeys explore outer space on a budget, the Care Bears care a lot...about ethnic cleansing, the Fantanas visit the Middle East peace Process, the legendary Krakken sea monster learns freedom isn't all it's "krak-ed" up to be, young Indiana Jones finds treasure in his elementary school, the classic movie The Beastmaster takes Broadway by storm, the Library of Heaven yields answers even God doesn't want you to know, Orlando Bloom must help his fellow passengers survive after a plane crash, Snow Job finds his specialized skills aren't in high demand with G.I. Joe, Mario and Luigi stumble into the violent world of "Grand Theft Auto", Stretch Armstrong needs a corn syrup transplant, and the cast of Sesame Street deals with a viral outbreak when Big Bird catches the bird flu.

== Guest stars ==
Many celebrities have guest starred in the second season of Robot Chicken: they include Sarah Michelle Gellar, Mila Kunis, Rachael Leigh Cook, Christian Slater, Corey Feldman, Macaulay Culkin, Jimmy Kimmel, Emma Caulfield, Michelle Trachtenberg, "Weird Al" Yankovic, Paul Rudd, Jamie Kaler, Corey Haim, Phyllis Diller, Ginnifer Goodwin, Abraham Benrubi, Bruce Campbell, Hal Sparks, Scott Adsit, Miguel Ferrer, Michael Ian Black, Rick Schroeder, James Van Der Beek, Hulk Hogan, Melanie Griffith, Cree Summer, Wayne Brady, Nick Simmons, Sarah Silverman, Kelly Hu, Josh Cooke, Gene Simmons, Alfonso Freeman, David Hasselhoff, Scarlett Johansson, Alan Cumming, Elijah Wood, Bridget Marquardt, Kendra Wilkinson, Holly Madison, Hugh Hefner, Eugene Byrd, Candace Bailey, Dr. Drew Pinsky and Charlize Theron.

== Episodes ==
| No. overall | No. in season | Title | Directed by | Written by | Original release date | Prod. code |
|---|---|---|---|---|---|---|
| 21 | 1 | "Suck It!" | Seth Green | Seth Green, Mike Fasolo, Charles Horn, Breckin Meyer & Matthew Senreich | April 2, 2006 | 201 |
Robot Chicken gets un-canceled! Learn tips for fighting terrorism! Mexico builds its greatest hero in "The Six Million Peso Man." Skater McGee is a re-animated corpse; an extreme re-animated corpse! Two aliens from Space Invaders revolt. A nerd polishes a unicorn's magic horn. And it's Mr. & Mrs. Smith, '70s style in "Mr. & Mrs. Brady"! Space Ghost, Master Shake, and Peter Griffin come in. Skits: "Renewal of Robot Chicken by Adult Swim", "Video Joy Stick", "Homeland Security Video", "Hangman Serial Killer", "Potato Whore", "The Six Million Peso Man", "He Who is Without Sin", "Two Scoops", "Skater McGee", "Space Invaders Revenge", "TARDIS Show and Tell", "Creature at the Bar", "Nerds and Unicorns", "Battling Pro Wrestlers", "Mr. and Mrs. Brady", "Coming This Season" Cast: Alex Borstein, Keith Crofford, Seth Green, Jamie Kaler, George Lowe, Seth MacFarlane, Breckin Meyer, Chad Morgan, Christian Slater, Dana Snyder, Fred Tatasciore, Rick Gomez (uncredited) Guest star: Mike Lazzo
| 22 | 2 | "Federated Resources" | Seth Green | Seth Green, Mike Fasolo, Charles Horn, Breckin Meyer & Matthew Senreich | April 9, 2006 | 205 |
A time-traveler wreaks havoc on history in "Dicks with Time Machines", but after he ends World War II by humiliating Adolf Hitler during a speech, the title changes to "Heroes with Time Machines". Lion-O, leader of the ThunderCats, is adopted as a little girl's pet. Clifford the Big Red Dog gets in big red trouble. Evel Knievel wows his nursing home. The Swedish Chef "borks" his way through New York City. Corey Haim and Corey Feldman reunite to rescue the President's daughters. Skits: "Naked Dancer", "Dicks with Time Machines", "Lion-O Gets Adopted", "Because She Was a Bitch", "Make the Carpet Match the Drapes", "Education Motivation", "Clifford the REALLY Big Red Dog", "Evel Knievel's Greatest Stunt Ever", "Swedish Chef's Jaunt", "Gulliver's Kinky Travels", "Heroes with Time Machines", "Nerf Stairs", "Corey & Corey Save the World" Cast: Michael Benyaer, Seth Green, Mila Kunis, Seth MacFarlane, Breckin Meyer, Chad Morgan, Victor Yerrid Guest stars: Corey Feldman, Corey Haim
| 23 | 3 | "Easter Basket" | Tom Root | Seth Green, Mike Fasolo, Charles Horn, Breckin Meyer & Matthew Senreich | April 16, 2006 | 202 |
Fred and Barney brawl over a box of Fruity Pebbles. Kids have fun with the Phyllis Diller Spray-n-Play. An Egyptian pharaoh builds a pyramid out of Lego, with some "minor" design changes. Superspy Sydney Bristow gets aquatic in '"Whalias". Anime and Santa collide in "A Very Dragon Ball Z Christmas". Skits: "Barney Love", "Zorro Sword Fight", "Cereal Killer", "There Are No R's", "Phyllis Diller Spray-n-Play", "Wowsers", "Egyptian Lego", "Ron Jeremy's Butter", "Whalias", "Damned Kids", "A Very Dragon Ball Z Christmas", "Bad Dog" Cast: Seth Green, Jamie Kaler, Dan Milano, Dana Snyder, Stephen Stanton, Lisa Sunstedt Guest stars: Phyllis Diller, Christian Slater
| 24 | 4 | "Celebrity Rocket" | Tom Root | Seth Green, Jordan Allen-Dutton, Mike Fasolo, Charles Horn, Breckin Meyer, Matthew Senreich & Erik Weiner | April 23, 2006 | 204 |
A Cuban youth plays Castro in "Dance Dance Counter-Revolution." Dirk the Daring from the video game Dragon's Lair fights middle age. Mr. Six, the old dancing guy from the Six Flags commercials saves, and ruins, the day. Lindsay Lohan enters the world of Highlander and battles (and decapitates) teen starlet foes, such as Amanda Bynes and Hilary Duff. Skits: "Corporate See-Saw", "Hungry Homeless Hippo", "Dance Dance Counter-Revolution", "Godzilla Toy", "Vampire Chase", "I Dream of Jeannie Revenge", "Satan Thanks", "Dragon's Lair: The Middle Ages", "Best Friends Forever?", "This Show Is So Clever", "Mr. Six Pays a Visit", "Powerpuff Stem Cell Research", "There Can Be Only One Lohan" Cast: Abe Benrubi, Seth Green, Ginnifer Goodwin, Jamie Kaler, Breckin Meyer, Chad Morgan, Dana Snyder, Fred Tatasciore Guest star: Michelle Trachtenberg
| 25 | 5 | "Dragon Nuts" | Doug Goldstein | Seth Green, Jordan Allen-Dutton, Mike Fasolo, Charles Horn, Breckin Meyer, Matthew Senreich & Erik Weiner | April 30, 2006 | 206 |
People of all ages (including actor Bruce Campbell) love the new toy, "Morning Wood!" A man's groin is possessed in "Idle Nuts". Live in fear when a giant midget attacks! A cleaning woman finds the Batcave the hard way. Atreyu and Falkor kick off a Neverending Party! An Omaha evening news broadcast spins out of control, with Paris Hilton as a weather reporter, and traffic copters anxiously watching a car, parodying Spy Hunter! Skits: "Vampire Office Workers", "Trio of Toasts", "Morning Wood", "Idle Nuts", "Attack of the Giant Midget", "Djinni Mermaid", "Batcave Discovery", "The Neverending Party", "Omaha's Number 1 News Team" Cast: Abe Benrubi, Tamara Garfield, Seth Green, Jordan Ladd, Tom Root Guest stars: Bruce Campbell, Macaulay Culkin, Peter Gallagher, Justin Timberlake, Michelle Trachtenberg
| 26 | 6 | "1987" | Doug Goldstein | Seth Green, Mike Fasolo, Charles Horn, Breckin Meyer & Matthew Senreich | May 7, 2006 | 203 |
Twinkie the Kid dispenses justice and lead! Popular board games from Chutes and Ladders to Hungry Hungry Hippos get turned into action-packed feature films. Meet Skeletor's dentist, Mo-Larr! Emperor Palpatine gets a collect call from Darth Vader. Mortal Kombat's Johnny Cage has a bad day on the job. An enraged Ted Turner transforms into his alter-ego, Captain Planet! Skits: "Twinkie the Kid Showdown", "Paper Cut", "Board Game Movies", "Humping Robot Callback", "Alien Abduction Reversal", "Mo-Larr: Eternian Dentist", "Meat Machine", "The Emperor's Phone Call", "Ent Pleasurer", "Mortal Kombat Physical Therapy", "Humping Robot Redux", "Snoopy's Back Problem", "Captain Planet", "Best Robot Chicken Ever" Cast: Leah Cevoli, Sarah Michelle Gellar, Seth Green, Seth MacFarlane, Breckin Meyer, Dan Milano, Dana Snyder Guest stars: Scott Adsit, Michael Ian Black, Miguel Ferrer, Hal Sparks
| 27 | 7 | "Cracked China" | Matthew Senreich | Jordan Allen-Dutton, Mike Fasolo, Seth Green, Matthew Senreich & Erik Weiner | May 14, 2006 | 207 |
Learn the secret of what Pikachu is up to inside his Poké Ball! Stupid kids get a new high from "numb-chucking." A checkers champion goes on the adventure of a lifetime. Meet Eagle Eye Smith, the blind athlete who will touch your heart. Then meet the four "My Little Ponys of the Apocalypse." The Golden Girls share their sexual escapades a la Sex and the City. Skits: "Pull My Finger", "Numb-Chucking", "Honest Zombie", "Will Work for Balls", "Apocalypse Pony", "Kiddie Driver", "Eagle Eye Smith", "Poké Ball High Life", "E.T. Doesn't Phone Home", "Space Checkers", "Flying Dad-Bomb", "Role Playing Game Reversal", "Golden Girls and the City" Cast: Jeannie Elias, Seth Green, Breckin Meyer, Chad Morgan, Susan Silo, Lisa Sunstedt, Adam Talbott
| 28 | 8 | "Rodiggity" | Matthew Senreich | Jordan Allen-Dutton, Mike Fasolo, Seth Green, Charles Horn, Breckin Meyer, Matthew Senreich & Erik Weiner | May 21, 2006 | 208 |
The Senior Mutant Ninja Turtles rock the nursing home! Rick Schroder is fighting crime in style in his new hit series "Rick Shaw". Order your movie tickets from Fan-Dingo, the paper bags want you to. The cast of Final Fantasy VII get jobs at a burger chain, and Sephiroth makes Cloud work overtime. The Booger Man makes a mess. Bugs Bunny goes hip-hop in "8 Carrot" (along with Porky Pig, Elmer Fudd, Daffy Duck, and Dr. Dre). Skits: "Alien Privacy", "Mime Car Accident", "Senior Mutant Ninja Turtles", "Dunst Rejection", "Dogs Playing Poker", "Rick Shaw", "Fan-Dingo", "Scott Norwood Can't Kick", "Robot Gag Gift", "Final Fantasy Burger Chain", "Rowdy Roddy Piper", "The Booger Man", "Sensitive Speak & Spell", "Abrupt Time Traveler", "8 Carrot" Cast: Bob Bergen, Rachael Leigh Cook, Bill Farmer, Quinton Flynn, Seth Green, Jamie Kaler, Jordan Ladd, Hilary Lowe, Adam Talbott Guest stars: Peter Gallagher, Ricky Schroder, James Van Der Beek
| 29 | 9 | "Massage Chair" | Doug Goldstein | Jordan Allen-Dutton, Mike Fasolo, Seth Green, Matthew Senreich & Erik Weiner | May 28, 2006 | 210 |
"Cuddles," the fabric softener bear gets the wrong kind of hug. Corporate disputes get solved hand-to-hand in "Office Kombat." Monkeys explore outer space on a budget. George W. Bush discovers he has Jedi powers. And we're back with more of those stupendous bloopers, including auditions tapes from MTV's Jackass! Skits: "Noisy Werewolf", "Incompetent Airport Security", "Cuddles Fabric Softener", "I Don't Want Your Sandwich", "Office Kombat", "Monkeys in Outer Space", "Mummy Tee Pee", "Do the Dew!", "Jedi Bush", "Verne Needs a Hand", "Bloopers! Three" Cast: Seth Green, Jamie Kaler, Jim Meskimen, Chad Morgan, Tom Root, Adam Talbott Guest stars: Emma Caulfield, Hulk Hogan, Jimmy Kimmel, James Van Der Beek
| 30 | 10 | "Password: Swordfish" | Matthew Senreich | Jordan Allen-Dutton, Mike Fasolo, Seth Green, Matthew Senreich & Erik Weiner | June 4, 2006 | 209 |
Care Bears care a lot...about ethnic cleansing. See the action-packed story of Heimlich and his quest to unblock your windpipe in "Heimlich Begins." A young soccer player named Ricky faces life's obstacles. Harry Potter uses magic to fight the evil monster, Pubertus! Rated TV-MA. Skits: "I Hate This Game!", "Care Bear Genocide", "Spy vs. Spy", "Do You Get It?", "Pick-Up Line Transposition", "Heimlich Begins", "Wax Cylinder Scratching", "Poor, Poor Ricky", "Out of Ice Cream", "Hamburger Deal", "Harry Potter vs. Pubertus" Cast: Bill Farmer, Quinton Flynn, Seth Green, Russel Harper, Jim Meskimen, Tom Root, Frank Welker (uncredited) Guest stars: Emma Caulfield, Melanie Griffith, Jimmy Kimmel, Ricky Schroder Title reference: The 2001 film Swordfish was mentioned twice in 2 different skits.
| 31 | 11 | "Adoption's an Option" | Tom Root | Hugh Davidson, Jordan Allen-Dutton, Mike Fasolo, Seth Green, Dan Milano, Matthew Senreich & Erik Weiner | September 17, 2006 | 216 |
Robot Chicken whores itself out to corporate America. The Fantanas visit the Middle East peace Process. E.T. finally returns home and interacts with his peers. The secret life of jack-o'-lanterns are finally revealed. A child's spaceship spells bad news for Dad. The mythical Pegasus meets a demented little girl. Skynet goes online, turning Inspector Gadget into an unstoppable killing machine! Skits: "Robot Chicken Sells Out", "The Fantanas", "Prison Headache", "E.T. Returns Home", "The Secret Life of Jack-O'Lanterns", "Three Hundred Copies", "The Best Spaceship Ever", "The Poison Cookie", "Pegasus Abuse", "Would You Like Fries with That?", "Go Go Gadget Killing Machine" Cast: Leah Cevoli, Seth Green, Joe Hanna, Jamie Kaler, Drew Massey, Lisa Rohr, Tom Root, Cree Summer, Adam Talbott, Frank Welker, Dan Milano Guest stars: Wayne Brady, William Mapother, Mindy Sterling
| 32 | 12 | "The Munnery" | Doug Goldstein | Hugh Davidson, Mike Fasolo, Seth Green, Dan Milano & Matthew Senreich | September 24, 2006 | 215 |
Meet Cork, America's first mentally-challenged crime sleuth! The legendary Krakken sea monster learns freedom isn't all it's "krak-ed" up to be. "Weird Al" Yankovic's "Weasel Stomping Day" gets a Robot Chicken music video treatment! The wishes of children come true, with dire results. The crew of the Starship Enterprise faces their gravest foe yet - themselves! Skits: "I Found Dad", "More Don't Ask Than Ever Before", "Bod by Zod", "There's No Place Like Home", "Cork", "The Krakken Is Free", "No Brakes", "Weasel Stomping Day", "A Couple of Silver Spoons", "Wishes Come True", "Wanna Play Doctor?", "Redshirt Revenge" Cast: Hugh Davidson, Ginnifer Goodwin, Seth Green, Todd Grinnell, Breckin Meyer, Dan Milano, Fred Tatasciore Guest stars: Alfonso Freeman, Sarah Silverman, Nick Simmons, "Weird Al" Yankovic
| 33 | 13 | "Metal Militia" | Seth Green | Hugh Davidson, Jordan Allen-Dutton, Mike Fasolo, Seth Green, Dan Milano, Matthew Senreich & Erik Weiner | October 1, 2006 | 211 |
A kid gets a used-car surprise: a Tron light-cycle! Young Indiana Jones finds treasure in his elementary school. Rom the Spaceknight meets his ultimate nemesis! Into the Blue gets a relevant skewering. Murky and Lurky make a gruesome discovery when they try to rob Rainbow Brite. Hulk Hogan busts out of prison camp in "Hogan's Heroes." Rated TV-MA. Skits: "Superman on Vacation", "Horton Hears a Jew!", "Forgetful Peter Pan", "Used Car Surprise", "Bomb Defusing Robot", "Rainbow Brite Breaking & Entering", "Rom Spaceknight", "How Much is That Doggie?", "Into the Blue Skewering", "Murderous William Tell", "Missing Gauze", "When Pigs Fly", "Safety Blanket", "Young Indy", "Hogan's Heroes" Cast: Ginnifer Goodwin, Seth Green, Roger L. Jackson, Breckin Meyer, Tom Root, Dan Milano Guest stars: Hulk Hogan, Kelly Hu, Roddy Piper
| 34 | 14A | "Veggies for Sloth" | Matthew Senreich | Hugh Davidson, Jordan Allen-Dutton, Mike Fasolo, Seth Green, Dan Milano, Matthew Senreich & Erik Weiner | October 8, 2006 | 212A |
The classic movie The Beastmaster takes Broadway by storm. Lance Armstrong gets revenge on France. Buck Rogers learns what his name rhymes with. The gang from Archie Comics learn that nobody cheats Death for long! Skits: "Insensitive Dad", "Lost Knight", "Andrew Lloyd Webber's The Beastmaster", "Super President Armstrong", "A Present for You", "Just Role Playing", "Twiki's Practical Joke", "Wedding Heart Attack", "Archie's Final Destination" Cast: Tamara Garfield, Seth Green, Mila Kunis, Breckin Meyer, Beverly Staunton Guest stars: Josh Cooke, Alan Cumming, David Hasselhoff, Scarlett Johansson, Shane McRae, Alfonso Ribeiro, Gene Simmons Note: An alternate version of this episode, titled "Blankets in a Pig", was first broadcast in April and May, 2008, with the Season 1 deleted scene "Citizen Spears" replacing "Archie's Final Destination" as the final segment.
| 34B | 14B | "Blankets in a Pig" | Matthew Senreich | Hugh Davidson, Jordan Allen-Dutton, Mike Fasolo, Seth Green, Dan Milano, Matthew Senreich & Erik Weiner | April 11, 2008; May 15, 2008 | 212B |
The classic movie The Beastmaster takes Broadway by storm. Lance Armstrong gets revenge on France. Buck Rogers learns what his name rhymes with. Britney Spears takes the role of Charles Foster Kane. Skits: "Insensitive Dad", "Lost Knight", "Andrew Lloyd Webber's The Beastmaster", "Super President Armstrong", "A Present for You", "Just Role Playing", "Twiki's Practical Joke", "Wedding Heart Attack", "Citizen Spears" Cast: Abraham Benrubi, Tamara Garfield, Seth Green, Mila Kunis, Breckin Meyer, Dan Milano (uncredited), Chad Morgan (uncredited), Beverly Staunton Guest stars: Josh Cooke, Alan Cumming, David Hasselhoff, Scarlett Johansson, Alfonso Ribeiro, Gene Simmons
| 35 | 15 | "Sausage Fest" | Tom Root | Hugh Davidson, Mike Fasolo, Seth Green, Dan Milano & Matthew Senreich | October 15, 2006 | 213 |
Lil' Hitler will win your heart! The Library of Heaven yields answers even God doesn't want you to know. The Burger King serves up some delicious B&E. Garfield and Heathcliff face off in court. A giraffe deals with the five stages of grief. The gang from Police Academy joins the X-Men. Rated TV-MA. Skits: "Smoke Sex", "The CEO of Burger King", "Don't Cross the Streams!", "Lil' Hitler", "The Book of Your Life", "Cat Court", "Five Stages of Grief", "X-Academy" Cast: Seth Green, Gary Holms, Fred Tatasciore, Bob Bergen (Uncredited) Guest stars: Marion Ramsey, Michael Winslow, Elijah Wood
| 36 | 16 | "Drippy Pony" | Doug Goldstein | Hugh Davidson, Mike Fasolo, Seth Green, Dan Milano & Matthew Senreich | October 22, 2006 | 214 |
Learn the secret life of Batman villain, The Penguin!; From the makers of My Buddy comes My Stalker, My Ex-Girlfriend, and My Friend Who I Experimented With at Summer Camp!; Orlando Bloomin' Onion must help his fellow passengers survive after a plane crash - with his delicious deep-fried onion hair! Jesus and the Argonauts find action and adventure, and turn the other cheek. The Micronauts climb the mountains which are big breasts. The U.S. government declares a war on Christmas. Skits: "Bumper Car Malfunction", "Jesus and the Argonauts", "Deep Throat Mistaken Identity", "My Stalker", "Orlando Bloomin' Onion", "March of the Penguin", "Who Wants Ice Cream?", "Micronaut Mountain Climbing", "Playboymobil", "N.O.R.A.D. Shoots Down Santa" Cast: Hugh Davidson, Ginnifer Goodwin, Seth Green, Tod Grinnell, Tom Kane, Breckin Meyer, Dan Milano, Guest stars: Alfonso Freeman, Hugh Hefner, Holly Madison, Bridget Marquardt, Sarah Silverman, Nick Simmons, Mindy Sterling, Kendra Wilkinson
| 37 | 17 | "A Day at the Circus" | Tom Root | Jordan Allen-Dutton, Mike Fasolo, Seth Green, Dan Milano, Matthew Senreich & Erik Weiner | October 29, 2006 | 217 |
Snow Job finds his specialized skills aren't in high demand with G.I. Joe. Thing grows up and leaves The Addams Family nest. The Memory Game challenges the brainpower of contestants, and the penalty for failure is death! The Black Stallion teaches us about race relationships. Oprah and Dr. Phil team up in the greatest buddy cop movie ever! Skits: "Medusa's Hairdresser", "A Go Job for Snow Job", "An Apple a Day", "The Wizard of Vomit", "Thing Leaves the Family", "Fireman Stripper Pole", "Leprechaun Gold", "The Memory Game", "The Black Stallion", "Billy the Snowman", "Tough Love" Cast: Leah Cevoli, Seth Green, Jamie Kaler, Drew Massey, Joel McCrary, Bill Ratner, Lisa Rohr, Adam Talbott, Pamela Tyson Guest stars: Eugene Byrd, William Mapother
| 38 | 18 | "Lust for Puppets" | Seth Green | Hugh Davidson, Jordan Allen-Dutton, Mike Fasolo, Seth Green, Dan Milano, Matthew Senreich & Erik Weiner | November 5, 2006 | 218 |
Montezuma gets his revenge, and the results smell horrible. Cameron Diaz has just 24 hours to live! Calvin and Hobbes have fun therapy adventures. Mario and Luigi stumble into the violent world of "Grand Theft Auto."; Skits: "Cheerleader Surprise", "Montezuma's Revenge", "Calvin's Therapy Adventures", "Karate Kid Knocked Down", "Two Weeks Notice", "Pop Goes the Casket", "Grandma Pix Message", "Cameron's Last Day", "Milano's Big Push", "Chili Time", "Frankenstein's Fiancee", "Ride My Ass", "Mouse Kamikaze", "Grand Theft Mario" Cast: Candace Bailey, Julianne Buescher, Rachael Leigh Cook, Seth Green, Hilary Lowe, Breckin Meyer, Dan Milano, Chad Morgan, Tom Root, Adam Talbott
| 39 | 19 | "Anne Marie's Pride" "Donkey Punch" | Seth Green | Jordan Allen-Dutton, Mike Fasolo, Seth Green, Dan Milano, Matthew Senreich & Erik Weiner | November 12, 2006 | 219 |
Mr. T and the Foo Fighters forge an unlikely alliance. Stretch Armstrong needs a corn syrup transplant. A guy dates his GPS navigational system. Learn the untold origin of Alvin and the Chipmunks! Roger Ebert and guest reviewer M. Night Shyamalan present upcoming feature films including Transporter 3, Happy Madison, Rudy 2, The Nightmare Before Hanukkah, and Speed 3, along with a sneak peek at Schindler's List 2: Schindler's Pissed. Skits: "Titanic Instant Messaging", "Attempted Clown Suicide", "I Pity That Foo", "Bird Feeding", "Stretch Armstrong Transplant", "Chili Day", "Gary's Crappy Day", "Books Are Fun", "GPS Dating", "Subway Monster", "Chipmunks Origin", "A Name That Parents Should Never Give Their Children", "At the Movies" Cast: Seth Green, Dan Milano, Stephen Stanton, Fred Tatasciore, Victor Yerrid Guest stars: Eugene Byrd, Scarlett Johansson
| 40 | 20 | "Book of Corrine" | Matthew Senreich | Jordan Allen-Dutton, Mike Fasolo, Seth Green, Dan Milano, Matthew Senreich & Erik Weiner | November 19, 2006 | 220 |
Vince Vaughn presents his new hit show, "Vince Vaughn Bangs Your Mom." Meet Casper's brother, "Jasper, the Douchebag Ghost." Ninjas compete in a game show. A nerd gives us a much-needed lesson on Gobots. The cast of Sesame Street deals with a viral outbreak when Big Bird catches the bird flu. A robot learns what it means to be alive. Robot Chicken holds a telethon that goes horribly awry. Skits: "GoBots Critiqued", "Snail Police", "Ninja Stars", "Feeding Baby", "Lobster with 'Tude", "Vince Vaughn Bangs Your Mom", "Sock Puppets", "Big Bird Flu", "A Message from the Bees", "Alive", "Santa", "Jasper, the Douchebag Ghost", "Pepsi Haters", "Natural Causes", "Robot Chicken Telethon", "Here for the Monkey" Cast: Seth Green, Jamie Kaler, Dan Milano, Tom Root, Matthew Senreich, Danny Smith Guest stars: Dr. Drew Pinsky, Paul Rudd, Charlize Theron

== DVD release ==
| Title | Release date | | | Episodes |
| Title | Region 1 | Region 2 | Region 4 | Episodes |
|---|---|---|---|---|
| "Season Two: Uncensored" | September 4, 2007 | September 28, 2009 | November 11, 2007 | 21-40 |
This two disc boxset includes all 20 episodes from Season 2 in production order and uncensored, with the words "fuck" and "shit" uncensored (except for one instance in the episode "Easter Basket" in the "Egyptian Lego" sketch). It is currently available for download on iTunes (though the episode "Veggies for Sloth" is absent because of copyright issues involving the "Archie's Final Destination" segment). Seth Green stated at Comic-Con 2006 that the second DVD set will contain the "Beavis and Butt-head Join Teen Titans" sketch, which had been removed from the first DVD set because of copyright issues. However, the sketch is absent from the DVD (although it is available on iTunes). Bonus features include the Christmas Special. A secret Nerf gun fight can be found on the disc 1 extras menu, and pushing "up" over the extras and set-up items on the menu reveals more special features.
