= Robot Chicken season 5 =

Robot Chicken
- Season 5
- DVD cover
- No. of episodes: 20

Release
- Original network: Adult Swim
- Original release: December 12, 2010 – January 15, 2012

Season chronology
- ← Previous; Season 4 Next → Season 6

The fifth season of the stop-motion television series Robot Chicken originally aired in the United States on Cartoon Network's late night programming block, Adult Swim. Season five officially began on December 12, 2010, on Adult Swim, with "Robot Chicken's DP Christmas Special", and contained a total of twenty episodes. The episode titles (excluding DP’s Christmas Special) are amalgamations of titles of what the show's crew members consider good and bad movies, in that order.

The show was filmed in 16:9 widescreen starting this season.

This is the last season to be co-produced by ShadowMachine Films, Sony Pictures Digital, and Cartoon Network Productions.

== Overview ==
The fifth season of Robot Chicken includes many TV, movie, commercial, pop culture parodies, all acted out by dolls and action figures, including parodies like: the creators imagine what Batman and Robin think about their Christmas jingle - hint: don't sing it if you value your life; what Skeletor is forced to do when Snake Mountain is foreclosed on; Gargamel puts himself in a Smurf body to gain the trust of the village; Major Nelson uses Jeannie to get back at NASA for firing him, NASA's Lego people have a very bad launch day, The creators imagine how Cabbage Patch Kids are made, The Keebler Elves go to war against the Cookie Monster, Strawberry Shortcake attempts to name Baby Needs-a-Name, A group of mentally challenged soldiers take on Hitler and the SS, The Joker finally gets what coming to him, Optimus Prime chooses his kick-ass name, what Eternia's 24-hour gym might be like, Princess Peach's parents react when they first met Mario, what life at Hogwarts would really be like, Superman tries to escape Lois' nagging, Doc Brown obtains plutonium, Dora the Explorer embarks on a dangerous Mount Everest excursion, A bunch of Spocks from the future gather for a surprise party, A lost The Lord of the Rings manuscript gets finished by Tolkien's 6-year-old grandson, and Sex and the City 3 tries to be more guy-oriented.

The fifth-season finale celebrates the show's 100th episode, featuring an alternate storyline, in which the Robot Chicken from the show's opening sequence is accidentally freed from the chair by the castle maid and escapes the Mad Scientist's lair. When RC returns home, he comes to find that his house has been broken into and discovers that his wife has been kidnapped by the Mad Scientist and is being forced to take his place in the chair. RC is then forced to return to the Mad Scientist's castle and battle his way through a series of Robot Chicken characters before finally meeting his maker in a final battle for his wife.

== Guest stars ==
Many celebrities have guest starred in Robot Chicken season five; they include Mila Kunis, Sarah Michelle Gellar, Macaulay Culkin, Seth MacFarlane, Sasha Barrese, Clare Grant, Michael Ian Black, Katee Sackhoff, Christian Slater, Fred Tatasciore, Dave Sheridan, Michelle Trachtenberg, Abraham Benrubi, Eden Espinosa, Alyson Hannigan, Chris Parnell, Skeet Ulrich, Tamara Garfield, Olivia Munn, Alan Tudyk, Lea Thompson, Sean Astin, Donald Faison, Katy Mixon, Andy Richter, Marc Summers, Amy Smart, Rove McManus, Adrianne Palicki, Pete Wentz, Kevin Bacon, Gary Coleman (final role before his death), Kyle Chandler, Elijah Wood, J.K. Simmons, Harland Williams, Amy Brenneman, Emma Stone, Diablo Cody, Kristen Bell, Nathan Fillion, Jennifer Field, Stuart Townsend, Bryan Cranston, Megan Fox, Brian Austin Green, Sam Kwasman, Josh Groban, Mark Hamill, Katelin Peterson, Freddie Prinze Jr., Zachary Gordon, Laura Ortiz, Magda Apanowicz, Quinton Flynn, Alison Brie, Stephen Stanton, Tisha Campbell-Martin, Mae Whitman, Christopher McCulloch, Jeri Ryan, Dana Daurey, Jon Hamm, Patrick Stump, Jeremy Renner, Affion Crockett, Christopher Lloyd, Jena Malone, Rachael Leigh Cook, Rachael MacFarlane and Frank Welker.

== Episodes ==
No. overall	No. in season	Title	Directed by	Written by	Original release date	Prod. code
81	1	"Robot Chicken's DP Christmas Special"	Chris McKay	Matthew Beans, Mike Fasolo, Seth Green, Brendan Hay, Daniel Libman, Matthew Libman, Matthew Senreich & Zeb Wells	December 12, 2010	506
It's Christmas, and the Robot Chicken writers and animators are out to put your precious Yuletide memories through the wood chipper. In this installment: Santa Claus gets revenge on the Coca-Cola company for using his likeness without his permission; a look at caveman Christmas; COBRA's henchmen from G.I. Joe sing "Deck the Halls"; Macaulay Culkin reprises his role as Kevin McCallister in a sketch that shows how Kevin setting up the traps for Marv and Harry are more dangerous than Marv and Harry falling victim to them; Santa doesn't want to hear Mrs. Claus' voice after his long night of delivering presents; the real story of how Mary got pregnant with Jesus; Batman and Robin go after some punk kids who sing the "Batman Smells" version of "Jingle Bells"; an elf's murderous thoughts as he builds toys on an assembly line; Composite Santa is summoned by a boy, "Bloody Mary"-style; the Grinch's heart "...growing three sizes that day" is actually a fatal condition; when a little boy asks his father if Santa is real, it turns into the iconic twist ending to The Usual Suspects; and Superman vs. Santa Claus on who's the fastest. Cast: Clare Grant, Seth Green, George Lowe, Seth MacFarlane, Breckin Meyer, Matthew Senreich Guest stars: Sasha Barrese, Macaulay Culkin Note: This is the first episode produced in 16:9 high definition.
82	2	"Saving Private Gigli"	Chris McKay	Matthew Beans, Mike Fasolo, Seth Green, Breckin Meyer, Eric Schaar, Matthew Senreich & Zeb Wells	January 9, 2011	501
Robot Chicken's recurring characters storm the beaches of Normandy; Predator stalks high school boys in the gym shower; a woman's bathtub suicide is interrupted by her husband using the toilet; Carl's balloon ride from the movie Up goes pear-shaped thanks to real-world physics; The Blockheads from Gumby get sentenced to death by Play-Doh Fun Factory; the real reason why Charlie Brown's parents' voices are represented by muted trumpet; Voldemort gets a nose job -- and a reason to go after Harry Potter; audience members' reactions to Stomp! have more rhythm than the actual show; couples skydiving turns into a marriage proposal, followed by a fight between the fiance and the ex-boyfriend; the Doozers from Fraggle Rock hire an illegal immigrant; and Skeletor rents out his castle to a fraternity to keep the bank from foreclosing on him. Cast: Seth Green, Breckin Meyer, Dan Milano, Patrick Pinney, Tom Root, Matthew Senreich Guest stars: Michael Ian Black, Katee Sackhoff, Christian Slater, Michelle Trachtenberg Note: The title is a mash-up of the films Saving Private Ryan and Gigli.
83	3	"Terms of Endaredevil"	Chris McKay	Matthew Beans, Mike Fasolo, Seth Green, Breckin Meyer, Eric Schaar, Matthew Senreich & Zeb Wells	January 16, 2011	502
Discover the secret origins of Mo-Larr, Eternian Dentist; a bald eagle wears a toupee; a sneak peek at Transformers 3; a LEGO man goes to court over teaching subversive material to children; a hot dog gets sexually humiliated by mustard; another sneak peek at Transformers 3; a rabbi refuses to "eat" a pig; Lara Croft from the Tomb Raider games is as cold as Tracey Ullman is annoying; Tobey Maguire and Jake Gyllenhaal star in the new movie, Earnest as F@*k; yet another sneak peek at Transformers 3; He-Man's father moves in with him; Kermit gets a prostate exam; Gargamel infiltrates the Smurfs' village with an avatar; and He-Man's father calls his son in a post-credits stinger. Cast: Abraham Benrubi, Eden Espinosa, Danny Goldman, Seth Green, Breckin Meyer, Dan Milano, Patrick Pinney, Matthew Senreich Guest star: Colin Hanks Note: The title is a mash-up of the films Terms of Endearment and Daredevil.
84	4	"Big Trouble in Little Clerks 2"	Chris McKay	Matthew Beans, Mike Fasolo, Seth Green, Breckin Meyer, Eric Schaar, Matthew Senreich & Zeb Wells	January 23, 2011	503
Cast: Seth Green, Matthew Senreich, Zeb Wells Guest stars: Dan Fogler, Alyson Hannigan, Chris Parnell, Meredith Salenger, Patrick Stump, Skeet Ulrich Note: The title is a mash-up of the films Big Trouble in Little China and Clerks 2.
85	5	"Kramer vs. Showgirls"	Chris McKay	Matthew Beans, Mike Fasolo, Seth Green, Breckin Meyer, Eric Schaar, Matthew Senreich & Zeb Wells	January 30, 2011	504
Cast: Tamara Garfield, Seth Green, Jonathan Lipow, Breckin Meyer, Matthew Senreich, Frank Welker Guest stars: Olivia Munn, Dave Sheridan, Alan Tudyk Note: The title is a mash-up of the films Kramer vs. Kramer and Showgirls.
86	6	"Malcolm X: Fully Loaded"	Chris McKay	Matthew Beans, Mike Fasolo, Seth Green, Breckin Meyer, Eric Schaar, Matthew Senreich & Zeb Wells	February 6, 2011	505
Cast: Abraham Benrubi, Madison Dylan, Donald Faison, Seth Green, Breckin Meyer, Dan Milano, Matthew Senreich, Frank Welker Guest star: Sean Astin Note: The title is a mash-up of the films Malcolm X and Herbie: Fully Loaded.
87	7	"Major League of Extraordinary Gentlemen"	Chris McKay	Matthew Beans, Mike Fasolo, Seth Green, Brendan Hay, Daniel Libman, Matthew Libman, Matthew Senreich & Zeb Wells	February 13, 2011	507
Skits: "Bart's Punishment", "Best 60 Seconds", "Meet the Bachelors", "Spider Sense", "Ballerina", "Oompa Loompas", "Unwrapped: Sundaes", "Dogs Doing It", "Krabby Patties", "Another Night at the Museum?", "Lucky Man", "Sidekick Elevator", "Humping Pinball", "Keebler Attacked" Cast: Seth Green, Tom Root, Matthew Senreich, Stephen Stanton, Zeb Wells Guest stars: Katy Mixon, Andy Richter, Marc Summers, Lea Thompson Note: The title is a mash-up of the films Major League and The League of Extraordinary Gentlemen.
88	8	"Schindler's Bucket List"	Chris McKay	Matthew Beans, Mike Fasolo, Seth Green, Brendan Hay, Daniel Libman, Matthew Libman, Matthew Senreich & Zeb Wells	February 20, 2011	508
Cast: Seth Green, Keith Ferguson, Drew Massey, Breckin Meyer, Matthew Senreich, Amy Smart, Victor Yerrid Guest stars: Rove McManus, Adrianne Palicki, Katee Sackhoff Note: The title is a mash-up of the films Schindler's List and The Bucket List.
89	9	"No Country for Old Dogs"	Chris McKay	Matthew Beans, Mike Fasolo, Seth Green, Brendan Hay, Daniel Libman, Matthew Libman, Matthew Senreich & Zeb Wells	February 27, 2011	509
Johnny Five gets stuck in the basement (three-part sketch throughout episode), two whiny kids and Batman complain in the backseat of a car; Morgan Freeman narrates the night he nearly died in a car crash in 2008; a kid goes hysterically blind in this PSA for The Kids Who Have Seen Their Parents Jerking Off Fund; Superman tricks Lois Lane, Lana Lang, and Batman into thinking he sacrificed his powers for them; the "very special episode" of Diff'rent Strokes where Arnold and Dudley get groomed and nearly molested by a pedophilic bike shop owner becomes a parody of the Liam Neeson movie Taken; Rainbow Brite's sister, Rainbow Dim, is a conspiracy theorist; a bar hook-up turns into a mash-up of the "stolen kidney" and "You Have AIDS' mirror message" urban legends; the "hook-handed hitchhiker" urban legend is actually a wholesome story of how a man met his wife; the VeggieTales spoof Fruity Fables takes on the need for sex education in public schools; and the mentally disabled take down Adolf Hitler and his Nazi regime in this send-up of Inglorious Basterds. Cast: Seth Green, Tom Kane, Mila Kunis, Breckin Meyer, Josh Perry, Matthew Senreich Guest stars: Kyle Chandler, Gary Coleman, Emma Stone Note: The title is a mash-up of the films No Country for Old Men and Old Dogs.
90	10	"Catch Me If You Kangaroo Jack"	Chris McKay	Matthew Beans, Mike Fasolo, Seth Green, Brendan Hay, Daniel Libman, Matthew Libman, Matthew Senreich & Zeb Wells	March 6, 2011	510
Cast: Keith Ferguson, Seth Green, Breckin Meyer, Matthew Senreich, Adam Talbott Guest stars: Diablo Cody, Josh Groban, Mark Hamill, Emma Stone Note: The title is a mash-up of the films Catch Me If You Can and Kangaroo Jack.
91	11	"Beastmaster and Commander"	Chris McKay	Matthew Beans, Mike Fasolo, Seth Green, Breckin Meyer, Matthew Senreich, Zeb Wells & Harland Williams	October 24, 2011	511
Hal Jordan loses his hands to, well, the hands of Sinestro, and without anywhere to put a ring, faces the possibility of no longer being a Green Lantern. Optimus Prime chooses his kick-ass name, albeit to the dismay of his relatively common named comrades. The presenter of a TV bloopers show displays scenes from his own life, including all of his mistakes and regrets he's forced to smile through. Cast: Abraham Benrubi, Seth Green, Jamie Kaler, Breckin Meyer, Matthew Senreich Guest stars: Kevin Bacon, Zachary Gordon, Jena Malone, Katelin Peterson Note: The title is a mash-up of the films The Beastmaster and Master and Commander.
92	12	"Casablankman"	Chris McKay	Matthew Beans, Mike Fasolo, Seth Green, Breckin Meyer, Matthew Senreich, Zeb Wells & Harland Williams	October 31, 2011	512
Cast: Rachael Leigh Cook, Eden Espinosa, Seth Green, Breckin Meyer, Tom Root, Matthew Senreich, Zeb Wells, Harland Williams Note: The title is a mash-up of the films Casablanca and Blankman.
93	13	"The Departy Monster"	Chris McKay	Matthew Beans, Mike Fasolo, Seth Green, Breckin Meyer, Matthew Senreich, Zeb Wells & Harland Williams	November 7, 2011	513
Cast: Seth Green, Rachael MacFarlane, Breckin Meyer, Matthew Senreich, Guest stars: Amy Brenneman, J. K. Simmons, Pete Wentz, Harland Williams, Elijah Wood Note: The title is a mash-up of the films The Departed and Party Monster.
94	14	"Some Like It Hitman"	Chris McKay	Matthew Beans, Mike Fasolo, Seth Green, Breckin Meyer, Matthew Senreich, Zeb Wells & Harland Williams	November 14, 2011	514
A look at life at Hogwarts, Donald Duck's sister has a dangerous escort job, and Betty Crocker and Sara Lee fight to the death. Skits: "High Noon", "Hogwarts Lessons", "Ordering Waters", "Bake-Off Beatdown", "Mighty Shield", "You're Terminated", "Alien Versus Predator", "Aquaman Vs. Big Oil", "The Chamber Pot", "Duck Duck Party" Cast: Jennifer Field, Sarah Michelle Gellar, Seth Green, Mila Kunis, Sam Kwasman, Matthew Senreich Guest stars: Kristen Bell, Nathan Fillion, Stuart Townsend Note: The title is a mash-up of the films Some Like It Hot and Hitman.
95	15	"The Core, the Thief, His Wife, and Her Lover"	Chris McKay	Matthew Beans, Mike Fasolo, Seth Green, Breckin Meyer, Matthew Senreich, Zeb Wells & Harland Williams	November 21, 2011	515
Cast: Seth Green, Sam Kwasman, Breckin Meyer, Matthew Senreich Guest stars: Megan Fox, Brian Austin Green, Danny Pudi, Mary Steenburgen Note: The title is a mash-up of the films The Core and The Cook, the Thief, His Wife, and Her Lover.
96	16	"The Godfather of the Bride 2"	Chris McKay	Jordan Allen-Dutton, Matthew Beans, Mike Fasolo, Seth Green, Matthew Senreich, Zeb Wells & Erik Weiner	December 5, 2011	518
Cast: Eden Espinosa, Seth Green, Matthew Senreich, Fred Tatasciore Guest stars: Alison Brie, Bryan Cranston, Affion Crockett, Jon Hamm Note: The title is a mash-up of the films The Godfather and Father of the Bride 2.
97	17	"The Curious Case of the Box"	Chris McKay	Jordan Allen-Dutton, Matthew Beans, Mike Fasolo, Seth Green, Matthew Senreich, Zeb Wells & Erik Weiner	December 12, 2011	517
Cast: Quinton Flynn, Seth Green, Breckin Meyer, Laura Ortiz, Matthew Senreich Guest stars: Magda Apanowicz, Bryan Cranston, Freddie Prinze, Jr. Note: The title is a mash-up of the films The Curious Case of Benjamin Button and The Box.
98	18	"Fool's Goldfinger"	Chris McKay	Jordan Allen-Dutton, Matthew Beans, Mike Fasolo, Seth Green, Matthew Senreich, Zeb Wells & Erik Weiner	December 19, 2011	519
Cast: Jordan Allen-Dutton, Dana Daurey, Seth Green, Matthew Senreich, Erik Weiner Guest stars: Bryan Cranston, Jon Hamm, Jeremy Renner, Jeri Ryan, Patrick Stump Note: The title is a mash-up of the films Fool's Gold and Goldfinger.
99	19	"Casablankman 2"	Chris McKay	Jordan Allen-Dutton, Matthew Beans, Mike Fasolo, Seth Green, Matthew Senreich, Zeb Wells & Erik Weiner	January 9, 2012	516
Doc Brown obtains plutonium; Jesus talks to normal humans; and Bella and Edward's life together is examined. Cast: Rachael Leigh Cook, Seth Green, Chris McCulloch, Breckin Meyer, Matthew Senreich, Stephen Staunton Guest stars: Tisha Campbell-Martin, Affion Crockett, Christopher Lloyd, Mae Whitman Note: The title, like Casablankman's, is a mash-up of the films Casablanca and Blankman.
100	20	"Fight Club Paradise"	Chris McKay	Jordan Allen-Dutton, Matthew Beans, Mike Fasolo, Seth Green, Matthew Senreich, Zeb Wells & Erik Weiner	January 16, 2012	520
Skits: "The Escape", "Sex and the City 3", "Power Forest Rangers", "Egyptian Boobies", "Chicken Clinic", "The Rescue" Cast: Seth Green, Jamie Kaler, George Lowe, Breckin Meyer, Matthew Senreich, Fred Tatasciore Guest stars: Michael Ian Black, Clark Duke, Katee Sackhoff, Christian Slater, Michelle Trachtenberg Note: The title is a mash-up of the films Fight Club and Club Paradise. This is also the final episode streamed censored on HBO Max. Starting with Season 6, all episodes are streamed uncensored and featured without the bleeps.

== DVD release ==
Title	Release date			Episodes
Title	Region 1	Region 2	Region 4	Episodes
"Robot Chicken: Season Five: Uncensored"	October 25, 2011	TBD	November 30, 2011	81-100
This two disc boxset includes all 20 episodes from Season 5. The special features include deleted scenes, deleted animatics with video introductions, episode commentaries with celebrity guests, behind the scenes featurettes, and on-air promotions.
