= Superpet =

Superpet may refer to:

- SuperPET, the Commodore PET model number SP9000 personal computer
- Legion of Super-Pets, fictional superhero team composed of pets from the DC Comics universe
  - DC League of Super-Pets, a 2022 film based on the Legion of Super-Pets
- Pets of Superman-family of comics with superpowers, see List of Superman supporting characters
- "Superpets", a 2008 skit from comedy stop-motion TV series Robot Chicken season 3
- "Superpets", a 1977 episode of BBC TV magazine That's Life!

== See also ==
- Wonder Pets!, cartoon TV series that airs on Nick Jr.
