= Robot Chicken season 6 =

Robot Chicken
- Season 6
- DVD cover
- No. of episodes: 20

Release
- Original network: Adult Swim
- Original release: September 17, 2012 – February 17, 2013

Season chronology
- ← Previous; Season 5 Next → Season 7

The sixth season of the stop-motion television series Robot Chicken originally aired in the United States on Cartoon Network's late night programming block, Adult Swim. Season six officially began on September 10, 2012, on Adult Swim, with Robot Chicken DC Comics Special and contained a total of twenty episodes. The first of the regular Season 6 episodes aired on September 17, 2012. (Note: Adult Swim lists the show's sixth season as premiering on September 16, 2012 at 12:00 a.m. (24:00) EST/PST, which is effectively September 17.) This is also the first season to be streamed uncensored on HBO Max, since the first five seasons are censored.

Most episode titles in the season are based on causes of death, with the titles for the Christmas special and the finale being the only exceptions.

== Overview ==
The sixth season of Robot Chicken includes many TV, movie, commercial, pop culture parodies, all acted out by dolls and action figures. In this season, the roles are reversed as Robot Chicken now forces the Mad Scientist to endure the same torture he was once subjected to. The sketches are now seen from his perspective.

Robot Chicken DC Comics Special (September 10, 2012) is a DC Universe special, in collaboration with DC Entertainment and Warner Bros. Animation. Voice actors are Seth Green as Batman, Robin and Aquaman, Paul Reubens as the Riddler, Neil Patrick Harris as Two-Face, Alfred Molina as Lex Luthor, Nathan Fillion as the Green Lantern, Megan Fox as Lois Lane, Breckin Meyer as Superman, and Kevin Shinick as the narrator. Cast also includes Abraham Benrubi, Alex Borstein, Clare Grant, Tara Strong, Matthew Senreich, Aaron Paul, Steven Tyler, Tom Root and Zeb Wells.

== Guest stars ==
Many celebrities have guest starred in Robot Chicken season 6; they include Whoopi Goldberg, Elizabeth Banks, Sam Elliott, Jason Sudeikis, Krysten Ritter, Fred Tatasciore, Jon Stewart, Stanley Tucci, Daniel Radcliffe, Patrick Stewart, Dan Milano, Victor Yerrid, Bill Farmer, Zeb Wells, Alex Borstein, Alan Tudyk, Christina Laskay, Tom Hiddleston, Ellie Kemper, Mark Hamill, Tamara Garfield, Liz Loza, Breckin Meyer, John Moschitta Jr., Britne Oldford, Rachel Bloom, Sarah Ramos, Dreama Walker, Rachael MacFarlane, Allison Janney, Kat Dennings, Liev Schreiber, Alex Winter, Shawn Patterson, Olivia Wilde, William Zabka, Ralph Macchio, Rhea Perlman, Ashley Eckstein, Lacey Chabert, Gillian Jacobs, Brent Spiner, Zachary Levi, J.B. Smoove, Lake Bell, Jon Bernthal, Nicholas Hoult, Robert Kirkman, Megan Hilty, Maurice LaMarche, Lucas Grabeel, Ke$ha, Sarah Chalke, Billy Zane, Sarah Michelle Gellar, Jim Hanks, Keith Ferguson, Patrick Pinney, Catherine Taber, Linda Cardellini, Rachael Leigh Cook, George Lowe, David Hasselhoff, David Morse, Skeet Ulrich, Stan Lee, Melissa Joan Hart, Emily Head, Max Charles, Frank Welker, Freddie Prinze Jr., Seth MacFarlane, Lauren Ambrose, Delroy Lindo, Ben Schwartz, Kathryn Hahn, Clare Grant, Abraham Benrubi, Eden Espinosa, Madison Dylan, Michaela Watkins, Henry Winkler, Laura Ortiz, Ashley Chaney, Keith David, Quinton Flynn, Joss Whedon, Malin Åkerman, Eric McCormack, 50 Cent, Judy Greer and Matthew Lillard.

== Episodes ==
No. overall	No. in season	Title	Directed by	Written by	Original release date	Prod. code	US viewers (millions)
101	1	"Executed by the State"	Zeb Wells	Matthew Beans, Mike Fasolo, Jessica Gao, Seth Green, Matthew Senreich & Zeb Wells	September 17, 2012	601	1.41
The roles of the Robot Chicken and the Mad Scientist are reversed in the new intro; Inspector Gadget becomes a cage dancer; the story behind the creation of the Starbucks logo; a woman's wish that everyone go vegetarian leads to cows getting their revenge on humanity; the return of Sabrina, The Teenage Bitch from season one; awkward homoerotic undertones from Top Gun; Wile E. Coyote commits suicide after realizing how futile his efforts in capturing the Road Runner have been; Evie from Out of This World rejects a boy based on penis size; why the agents of M.A.S.K. should have picked a better hideout than a gas station; A "good cop, bad cop" interrogation scene where the Pixar lamp, Luxo Jr., is the bad cop; Marvel characters a capella, featuring Stan Lee himself; Orville and Gary Redenbacher encounter the Children of the Popcorn; a spork goes both ways at a bar; and the G.I. Joes encounter their deadliest foe yet: a live-action kid who destroys the toys he plays with. Note: This is the first episode streamed uncensored on HBO Max. Guest stars: Max Charles, Kat Dennings, Ben Foster, Melissa Joan Hart, Stan Lee, Jon Stewart, Skeet Ulrich
102	2	"Crushed by a Steamroller on My 53rd Birthday"	Zeb Wells	Matthew Beans, Mike Fasolo, Jessica Gao, Seth Green, Matthew Senreich & Zeb Wells	September 24, 2012	602	1.23
Alvin and the Chipmunks deal with horny groupies; Captain America's plans to solve America's energy crisis go unheeded; a farmer regrets translating Lassie's barking; why B.A. Baracus from The A-Team refuses to get on planes; paternity test drama for Rosemary and The Virgin Mary on today's episode of Lonnie Peppers; Bella and Jacob from Twilight; a couple watch nanny cam footage of what Mary Poppins does when she's babysitting the kids; Woody Woodpecker gets harassed over his name; a woman thinks back to the reason why her husband committed suicide; a grandmother knits a sweater for her daughter's human centipede; Robbie Sinclair from Dinosaurs walks the Earth again; Spider-Man's unusual bathroom habits; and the G.I. Joes get deployed to Afghanistan. Guest stars: Emily Head, Ellie Kemper, Shawn Patterson, J. B. Smoove, Skeet Ulrich, Olivia Wilde
103	3	"Punctured Jugular"	Zeb Wells	Matthew Beans, Mike Fasolo, Jessica Gao, Seth Green, Matthew Senreich & Zeb Wells	October 1, 2012	603	1.26
The new Fast and the Furious movie has to make due with Big Wheels thanks to a ban on all cars; Polly Pocket on Hoarders; Jem reveals her true identity after sex, and her partner doesn't care; Wilson the Volleyball from Cast Away is on the run from the law; Oddjob loses his hat in a Benny Hill-style farce; what happens when a suicide bomber can't remove his explosive vest; the downside of having Astro Boy as the world's greatest weapon; the Humping Robot notifies neighbors that he's a registered sex offender; Buffalo Bill from Silence of the Lambs buys expensive skin care products for his latest victim; the seven dwarves pay to have sex with Snow White; Gargamel is in court for genocide; and Lisbeth Salander replaces Velma in the Scooby-Doo gang. Guest stars: Linda Cardellini, Jim Hanks, Gillian Jacobs, Matthew Lillard, Freddie Prinze Jr.
104	4	"Poisoned by Relatives"	Zeb Wells	Matthew Beans, Mike Fasolo, Jessica Gao, Seth Green, Matthew Senreich & Zeb Wells	October 8, 2012	604	1.25
A scientist reveals that casual talk at the urinals is unnatural; the consequences of Street Fighter characters not reading the packet; inane conversation from Segways; Decepticons hide out at a Prius dealership; Shirt Tales are part of a WWII aerial dogfight; the perverted death of Osama bin Laden; Aughra hits on Gelfling; a woman with a Facehugger buys morning-after pills; King Don gets deposed and executed; a kid imagines that his chicken dinner is him destroying the cast of DuckTales; a Predator date ends with the male Predator becoming invisible after slipping in mud; and see all your favorite overweight fictional characters from the 80s like Winnie the Pooh, Miss Piggy, Garfield, and Mario from the Mario Bros. try to lose weight on The Fattest Fat Loser. Guest stars: Megan Hilty, Zachary Levi, Billy Zane
105	5	"Hurtled from a Helicopter into a Speeding Train"	Zeb Wells	Matthew Beans, Mike Fasolo, Seth Green, Mehar Sethi, Matthew Senreich & Zeb Wells	October 15, 2012	606	1.13
A Lord of the Rings auction; locker room talk from The California Raisins; a commercial for white wine turns into a three-part tale of how one man deals with the revelation that his best friend is gay; Ben 10 gets socks and a telescope for his 14th birthday; an alternate ending to E.T. where Elliot does go with E.T. back to his home planet; a cat gets executed; a California Raisin picks up an underage "grape"-ie; a Jewish boy asks about the empty seat set at the Passover table; why being psychically connected with a Sectaur is a bad idea; the origins of the word "horsepower"; post-coital innuendo with The Thing; we finally find out what the "purple stuff" that the kids pass up in the old Sunny D commercials is; a painful prostate exam; and The Planeteers summon Captain Planet to fight the biggest environmental foe of all: The U.S. government. Guest stars: Sam Elliott, Mark Hamill, John Moschitta Jr., Britne Oldford
106	6	"Disemboweled by an Orphan"	Zeb Wells	Matthew Beans, Mike Fasolo, Seth Green, Mehar Sethi, Matthew Senreich & Zeb Wells	October 22, 2012	605	1.63
A Grim Reaper mouse gets attacked by a cat; Cupid gets gunned down by the police; the reason why aliens use anal probes on the people they abduct; a salt shaker shocks her family when she brings home her new boyfriend, Pepper; Gadget Hackwrench goes pantless and Dale, Chip, Monterey Jack, and Zipper can't handle it; Dune buggies; Mr. Miyagi can't help Daniel-san; two female velociraptors try to make male counterparts in Jurassic Park; Hitler sneezes while sitting next to Jews in a restaurant; the magic hat that brings Frosty the Snowman to life also brings to life manure, flaming garbage, and possesses a police officer; birds attack lovers in a park; Bo and Luke from The Dukes of Hazzard decide to pull over for the cops rather than evade them; the Punisher berates a mom for spanking her bratty kid at a grocery store; the story behind the Pythagorean thereom; Monterey Jack has a cheese attack when getting his picture taken; a football huddle turns into an intervention; and middle-aged tourists take in the sights of Eternia. Guest stars: Sarah Chalke, Patrick Stewart, Catherine Taber
107	7	"In Bed Surrounded by Loved Ones"	Zeb Wells	Matthew Beans, Mike Fasolo, Jessica Gao, Seth Green, Matthew Senreich & Zeb Wells	October 29, 2012	607	1.17
Optimus Prime's trailer would rather be in bed with her boyfriend than help people; Apache Chief's revenge takes a mortifying turn; a businessman literally reinvents the wheel; a male version of the infamous "Not So Fresh" commercial; Bill and Ted's history presentation is undercut by disturbing facts; an egg fails to care for a human baby; an intervention with Disney's The Gummi Bears; the Mortal Kombat announcer wants the fighters to kiss; Blue from Blue's Clues gets a mercy killing; what "going number three" really means; a Lego suburban drama; a man at the video store thinks the Nickelodeon cartoon The Angry Beavers is a porno; an educational video about how the extinction of wolves lead to the homeless being armed and dangerous; the Scarecrow from The Wizard of Oz gets a degree from DeVry University; and Captain Kirk has space herpes. Guest stars: Allison Janney, Joe Lo Truglio, Sarah Ramos, Alex Winter
108	8	"Choked on Multi-Colored Scarves"	Zeb Wells	Matthew Beans, Rachel Bloom, Mike Fasolo, Seth Green, Jason Reich, Matthew Senreich & Zeb Wells	November 5, 2012	609	1.14
A video game cartridge gets "blown"; cloud-gazing turns into witnessing a murder; what if HAL's dying song in 2001: A Space Odyssey wasn't "Daisy"; Real Steel gets real violent; when sitcom opening themes get weird; a Roman emperor wants his gladiators to have sex rather than kill each other; the Robot Chicken Nerd is in a first-person shooter; a man goes on a dinner date with a zombie; Steven Spielberg creates the mother of all movie remakes after his assistant talks him out of doing TV shows; She-Ra accidentally injures her horse; AM radio isn't dead; and Skeletor poses as a baby in his plot to destroy He-Man. Guest stars: Whoopi Goldberg, Rachael MacFarlane
109	9	"Hemlock, Gin and Juice"	Zeb Wells	Matthew Beans, Mike Fasolo, Seth Green, Breckin Meyer, Jason Reich, Matthew Senreich, Erik Weiner & Zeb Wells	November 12, 2012	613	1.13
Superman and Krypto the Superdog get neutered; ordering a "what-what" from the drive-thru; the Kool-Aid Man is never around when you need him; Dora the Explorer's teenage adventures; bass with a bass; fire extinguisher porn is hot; a paranormal activity video goes viral; Pammy Panda from Shirt Tales can't hide the truth about her bad date; the first photobomb; the dam dive from The Fugitive is actually an Olympic event; a Native American's Cornholio impression is met with disgust; soy milk is a poor substitute for Kool-Aid; pen-on-paper porn ends prematurely; a pirate ship capsizes and rights itself back up; the origin story of Angry Birds; oral sex with Iceman; Kool-Aid is a poor substitute for water at a wet T-shirt contest; and Thomas the Tank Engine gets hijacked. Guest stars: Keith David, Kathryn Hahn, Daniel Radcliffe
110	10	"Collateral Damage in Gang Turf War"	Zeb Wells	Matthew Beans, Rachel Bloom, Mike Fasolo, Seth Green, Jason Reich, Matthew Senreich & Zeb Wells	November 19, 2012	610	1.88
Skits: "Your Challenge Is", "Shell Spin", "A Critical Component", "Dr. ET", "The Nicest Mice", "Harry's Wand", "Thank You Mario!", "Part of Your (Cruel) World", "A Ruined Nation", "Fun For All Ages", "To the Bone", "Magic Pun", "Zombie Love" Guest stars: Lake Bell, Jon Bernthal, Nicholas Hoult, Robert Kirkman, Liev Schreiber
111	11	"Eviscerated Post-Coital by a Six Foot Mantis"	Zeb Wells	Matthew Beans, Mike Fasolo, Seth Green, Breckin Meyer, Jason Reich, Matthew Senreich, Erik Weiner & Zeb Wells	December 2, 2012	614	2.01
A kid's unexpected death after eating Pop Rocks and drinking soda; Pinky and the Brain go on a wild night out; Toby from Labyrinth sees a psychiatrist about his traumatic childhood at the hands of Jareth and his goblins; Robot Chicken's version of The Land Before Time is very boring; Oscar the Grouch's new neighbor is into recycling; double standards in airport security; a Hot Wheels car crash; a grandfather teaches his grandson how to hammer a nail; a rags-to-riches-to-rags story featuring Mario and Luigi; the Whammy from Press Your Luck goes too far in insulting a contestant; Superman puts his costume on inside out and gets mistaken for Bizarro; the Cloverfield monster records his attack on the city; a simple-minded weather man gets a lollipop; and Rambo remembers how the Vietcong tortured him. Guest stars: Maurice LaMarche, Alan Tudyk
112	12	"Butchered in Burbank"	Zeb Wells	Matthew Beans, Rachel Bloom, Mike Fasolo, Seth Green, Jason Reich, Matthew Senreich & Zeb Wells	December 9, 2012	611	1.65
Smurf radio; a three-part piece on the love, loss, and suicide of Pac-Man; Tron uses BASIC to take down the Master Computer; Street Sharks is totally different from Teenage Mutant Ninja Turtles; a read-along adventure with the Robot Chicken unicorn; a cobbler gets his wish from some elves; robots attack a man on the toilet; the Monopoly board game becomes the latest inspiration for an HBO drama series; the robot from Lost in Space now cockblocks people out of drunken hook-ups; Dracula gets invited to dinner; Ariel from The Little Mermaid finds trash and medical waste in the East River; Robin Hood's mission to "rob from the rich and give to the poor" is a paradox; Buzz Lightyear learns too late that going "to infinity and beyond" is impossible; and a Dr. Seuss-esque story about how The Lorax's movie adaptation cheapened the original story's moral. Guest stars: David Hasselhoff, Tom Hiddleston, David Morse, Stanley Tucci
113	13	"Robot Chicken's ATM Christmas Special"	Zeb Wells	Matthew Beans, Mike Fasolo, Seth Green, Mehar Sethi, Matthew Senreich & Zeb Wells	December 16, 2012	608	2.17
Santa goes on a mad dash to deliver presents to kids on Christmas Eve (What could go wrong?!); a Chinese restaurant worker is stuck serving Jewish people on Christmas; a betrayed Christmas tree gets recycled into toilet paper; a candy cane is a terrible choice to help Santa walk on his broken leg; Big-Foot Danny scores the most stocking stuffers on Christmas morning; Justin Bieber's Christmas Special has plenty of unhinged performances; Jason Bourne vs. Santa Claus; a Lego boy hates his Christmas gift; the G.I. Joes go on their most dangerous mission yet: getting a gift for Snake Eyes; Kano from Mortal Kombat spends Christmas with Johnny Cage's family to make up for killing Johnny Cage; and Nerd saves Christmas from the Grinch (the character from 2000 live-action movie). Note: This is the show's first Christmas episode streamed uncensored on HBO Max. Guest stars: Elizabeth Banks, Lucas Grabeel, Larry Hama, Skeet Ulrich, Michaela Watkins, Henry Winkler
114	14	"Papercut to Aorta"	Zeb Wells	Matthew Beans, Rachel Bloom, Mike Fasolo, Seth Green, Jason Reich, Matthew Senreich & Zeb Wells	January 6, 2013	612	1.79
Statler's snarky comment about a movie is undercut by Waldorf's more educated response; The Adventures of Rocky and Bullwinkle gets filtered through John Steinbeck's Of Mice and Men; Mike Fasolo gets revenge on the monkeys who laugh at him for sitting down to pee; VH1 presents The Top 100 Sexual Fetishes of The Easter Bunny; a scorpion wants a Ryan Gosling jacket, but gets Ryan Reynolds; the disgusting reality of having 101 dalmatians as pets; the "Just Like Mommy" playset captures Mommy's failed dreams and unhealthy coping habits; in 2050, a war robot has gained free will -- and sings just like Ke$ha; Badtz-Maru from the Hello Kitty franchise comes home to his penguin family; a track sprint turns into kids doing The Running Man; and a famine from a gypsy moth infestation prompts Smurfville to have its own Hunger Games. Guest stars: Lauren Ambrose, Ke$ha, Delroy Lindo, Ben Schwartz, Jason Sudeikis
115	15	"Caffeine-Induced Aneurysm"	Zeb Wells	Matthew Beans, Mike Fasolo, Seth Green, Breckin Meyer, Jason Reich, Matthew Senreich, Erik Weiner & Zeb Wells	January 13, 2013	615	1.72
Carly forgets to stop filming during iCarly and broadcasts herself showering, causing her father to launch a nuke on Iran. Guest stars: Lacey Chabert, Ashley Eckstein, Ralph Macchio, Rhea Perlman, Brent Spiner, William Zabka
116	16	"Eaten by Cats"	Zeb Wells	Matthew Beans, Mike Fasolo, Seth Green, Breckin Meyer, Jason Reich, Matthew Senreich, Erik Weiner & Zeb Wells	January 20, 2013	616	2.10
A crash test with eggs instead of dummies; the Teletubbies get picked as the newest generation of Power Rangers; a little boy's proposal for a Star Wars alphabet soup gets him drowned by his father; waterfalls stop being fun to swim in when a giant uses them as a toilet; The Annoying Orange, only with Marvel superhero props; a Back to the Future parody where Marty McFly criticizes the DeLorean (and other vehicles) that Doc used to create a time machine; Cheer Bear from Care Bears proselytizes and a man tries to avoid her; guessing a password to a speakeasy is just like guessing a computer password on this installment of Early Hackers; Hans Gruber puts up with Tony's death and his idiot henchman in this Die Hard parody; PaRappa the Rapper becomes the unlikely winner of a rap battle; a golem tricks a narrator into thinking he's the victim of an anti-Semitic attack; and the apocalyptic drama Children of Men takes place in the world of Legos. Guest stars: 50 Cent, Adrian Lester, Christopher Lloyd, David Shaughnessy
117	17	"Botched Jewel Heist"	Zeb Wells	Matthew Beans, Rachel Bloom, Mike Fasolo, Jessica Gao, Seth Green, Matthew Senreich, Tom Sheppard & Zeb Wells	January 27, 2013	617	1.71
Mr. Peanut and a strawberry get whacked by the mob -- and turned into a delicious snack; what Jesus' crucifixion would have been like through the minds of fanfiction writers; RZA raps about being a pescatarian; snappy answers to stupid proctology questions; when Lion-O from ThunderCats forgets his sword, everyone suffers; Scary Movies for People With Heart Conditions has a grandmother whose constant soap opera watching has her pegged as a figurative "zombie"; William Tell kills his child target; Michael Myers and Jason Voorhees go on a coed killing spree; a Care Bear dirty phone call; a kitten sneezing turns into a twist and a call back to a previous sketch; Bear-alis helps crazy woodsmen have sex with bears; Goofy and Clarabelle Cow's relationship prompts Mickey Mouse to call for a ban on interspecies relationships in the Disney universe; and a Mad Max parody where a family dodges holiday gangs in a post-apocalyptic warzone. Guest stars: RZA, Adam Scott, Evan Rachel Wood
118	18	"Robot Fight Accident"	Zeb Wells	Matthew Beans, Rachel Bloom, Mike Fasolo, Jessica Gao, Seth Green, Matthew Senreich, Tom Sheppard & Zeb Wells	February 3, 2013	618	2.07
Skits: "Oink", "Twist Endings", "Classroom Gimp", "AberZombie & Fitch", "Schoolhouse Rock Reimagined", "True Love's Kiss", "Oink, Again", "Aliens Meet the Jetsons", "Arbor Day Love", "Pasta Urkel", "The Big Bad Nerd Wolf", "Oink Once More", "Avengers: Musictacular Tapstravaganza" Guest stars: Malin Åkerman, Judy Greer, Robert Kazinsky, Stan Lee, Eric McCormack
119	19	"Choked on a Bottle Cap"	Zeb Wells	Matthew Beans, Rachel Bloom, Mike Fasolo, Jessica Gao, Seth Green, Matthew Senreich, Tom Sheppard & Zeb Wells	February 10, 2013	619	1.87
Guest stars: Dave Foley, Page Kennedy
120	20	"Immortal"	Zeb Wells	Matthew Beans, Rachel Bloom, Mike Fasolo, Jessica Gao, Seth Green, Matthew Senreich, Tom Sheppard & Zeb Wells	February 17, 2013	620	2.12
Guest stars: Clark Duke, Krysten Ritter, Dreama Walker, Joss Whedon
