= The Neverending Story (disambiguation) =

The Neverending Story is a 1979 German fantasy novel by Michael Ende.

The Neverending Story may also refer to:

== Film and television ==
- The NeverEnding Story (film series)
  - The NeverEnding Story (film), 1984, based on the novel
  - The NeverEnding Story II: The Next Chapter, 1990, sequel to the film
  - The NeverEnding Story III, 1994, second sequel
- Never Ending Story (film), a 2012 South Korean film
- The Neverending Story (TV series), a 1995–1996 animated television series
- "The NeverEnding Story", 90 Day Fiancé: Before the 90 Days season 4, episode 15 (2020)

== Music ==
- "The NeverEnding Story" (song), by Limahl, the theme from the 1984 film
- "Never Ending Story", by Catch 22 from their album Alone in a Crowd
- "Never-ending Story", a 2003 single by Within Temptation from their album Mother Earth

== See also ==
- Tales from the Neverending Story, a 2001–2002 Canadian television series loosely based on the novel
- "Dragon Nuts", episode 5 from the second season of Robot Chicken (2006), which featured a sketch parody of The NeverEnding Story
- "The Seemingly Never-Ending Story", a 2006 episode of The Simpsons
- "The Never-Ending Stories", a 2018 episode of American Dad!
