= Katelin Petersen =

American actress, writer, and producer (born 1989)

- Born: February 8, 1989 (age 37); Los Angeles, California, U.S.
- Education: California State University
- Occupation: Actress
- Years active: 1997–present
- Spouse: Ryan Grady (m. 2016; div. 2021)

Katelin Petersen (born February 8, 1989) is an American actress, writer, and producer. She played the young Annika Hansen before she became Seven of Nine on an episode of Star Trek: Voyager.

She wrote, directed, and appeared in a horror short film, "Annabelle's Box." A rough edit was released on YouTube in 2016.

== Filmography ==
- Celebrity guest star on Robot Chicken.
- My Neighbor Totoro (1988)
- Angel on Abbey Street (1999) as Lizbeth
- The Next Best Thing (2000) as Kid #4
- Cahoots (2001) as Cassie
- Where the Heart Is (2000)
- Wuthering Heights (2003)
- Two and a Half Men (2003) as Katie
- Charlie Bartlett (2007)
