= Leah Cevoli =

- Born: Leah Ann Cevoli; May 4, 1974 (age 52); Philadelphia, Pennsylvania, US
- Occupation: Actress
- Years active: 2005–present

Leah Cevoli (born Leah Ann Cevoli) is an American film and television actor, host, and producer. She first gained recognition on the HBO series Deadwood and doing voice overs on the Adult Swim series Robot Chicken.

== Filmography ==
- Out of the Way (2005) as Jack's wife
- Deadwood (2005–2006) as Gem Whore Leah
- My Name Is Earl (2006) as Hippy Singer
- 1% (2007) as Dacian Old Lady
- Dead & Nowhere (2008) as Mary
- Robot Chicken (2005–2009) as (voice)
- Un-broke: What You Need To Know About Money (2010) as Personnel Staff
- Body of Work (2010) as Haley, Producer
- The Best Friend (2010) as Wedding Dress
- My Trip to the Dark Side (2011) as Maria the Script Supervisor
- The Family Curse (2012) as Eliza Ellis
- The Glass Slipper (2015) as Leigh
- Puppet (2016) as Talia Hutton
- Remember The Sultana (2018) as Eliza Francis
- Dance Baby Dance (2018) as Cindy
- Girl Lost (2018)
- Girl Lost: A Hollywood Story (2020) as Karen Lloyd (social worker)
- The Last Exorcist (2020) as Dr. Dorothy Link
