= Robot Chicken =

American adult animated stop-motion sketch comedy television series

- Genre: Adult animation; Sketch comedy; Black comedy; Surreal humor; Parody; Satire
- Created by: Seth Green; Matthew Senreich
- Voices of: Seth Green; Matthew Senreich; Breckin Meyer; Tom Root; Dan Milano; Tom Sheppard; Abraham Benrubi; Chad Morgan; Seth MacFarlane
- Opening theme: "Robot Chicken" by Les Claypool
- Ending theme: "The Gonk", a capella cover by the cast (original by Herbert Chappell)
- Composers: Michael Suby (S1–4); Adam Sanborne (S1–4); Charles Fernandez (S3–4); Mark Gregory Weiner (S4); Shawn Patterson (S5–7); Kevin Manthei (S7–9); Randall Crissman (S8–11); John Zuker (S11)
- Country of origin: United States
- No. of seasons: 11
- No. of episodes: 220 (and 13 specials) (list of episodes)

Production
- Executive producers: Seth Green; Matthew Senreich; Keith Crofford (Note: Executive producer for Williams Street) (2005–2020); Mike Lazzo (2005–2020); John Harvatine IV (2012–present); Eric Towner (2012–present); Tom Root (2012–present); Doug Goldstein (2012–present); Sam Register (Note: Executive producer for Warner Bros. Animation; DC Comics specials only) (2012–2015); Walter Newman (2021–present)
- Producers: Alex Bulkley (2005–2012); Corey Campodonico (2005–2012); Whitney Loveall (2019–2020); Laura Pepper (2021–present)
- Running time: 11 minutes (regular); 22 minutes (specials)
- Production companies: ShadowMachine Films (S1–5); Stoop!d Monkey; Stoopid Buddy Stoodios (S6–S11); Sony Pictures Digital (S1–5); Sony Pictures Television (S6–10) (Note: Also specials since 2012.); Warner Bros. Animation (Note: DC Comics specials only.); Williams Street

Original release
- Network: Adult Swim
- Release: February 20, 2005 – present

Robot Chicken is an American adult stop-motion animated sketch comedy television series created by Seth Green and Matthew Senreich for Cartoon Network's nighttime programming block Adult Swim. The twelve-minute show consists of short unrelated sketches usually satirizing pop culture characters or celebrities. Toys are employed as the players, animated via stop motion and supplemented by claymation. The voice cast changes every episode, and features many celebrity cameos. The writers, most prominently Green, also provide many of the voices. Robot Chicken has won two Annie Awards and six Emmy Awards.

== Production history ==
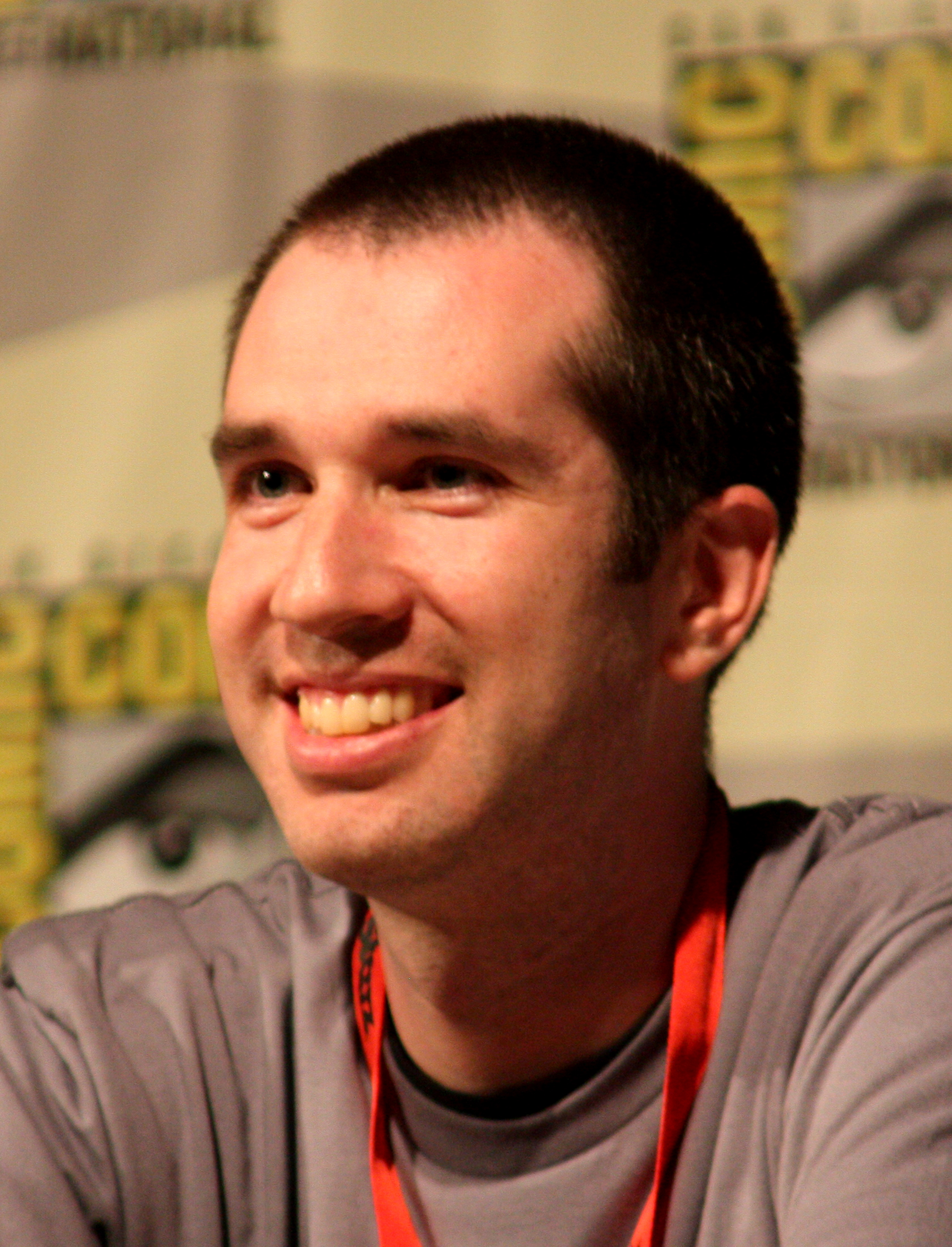
Matthew Senreich

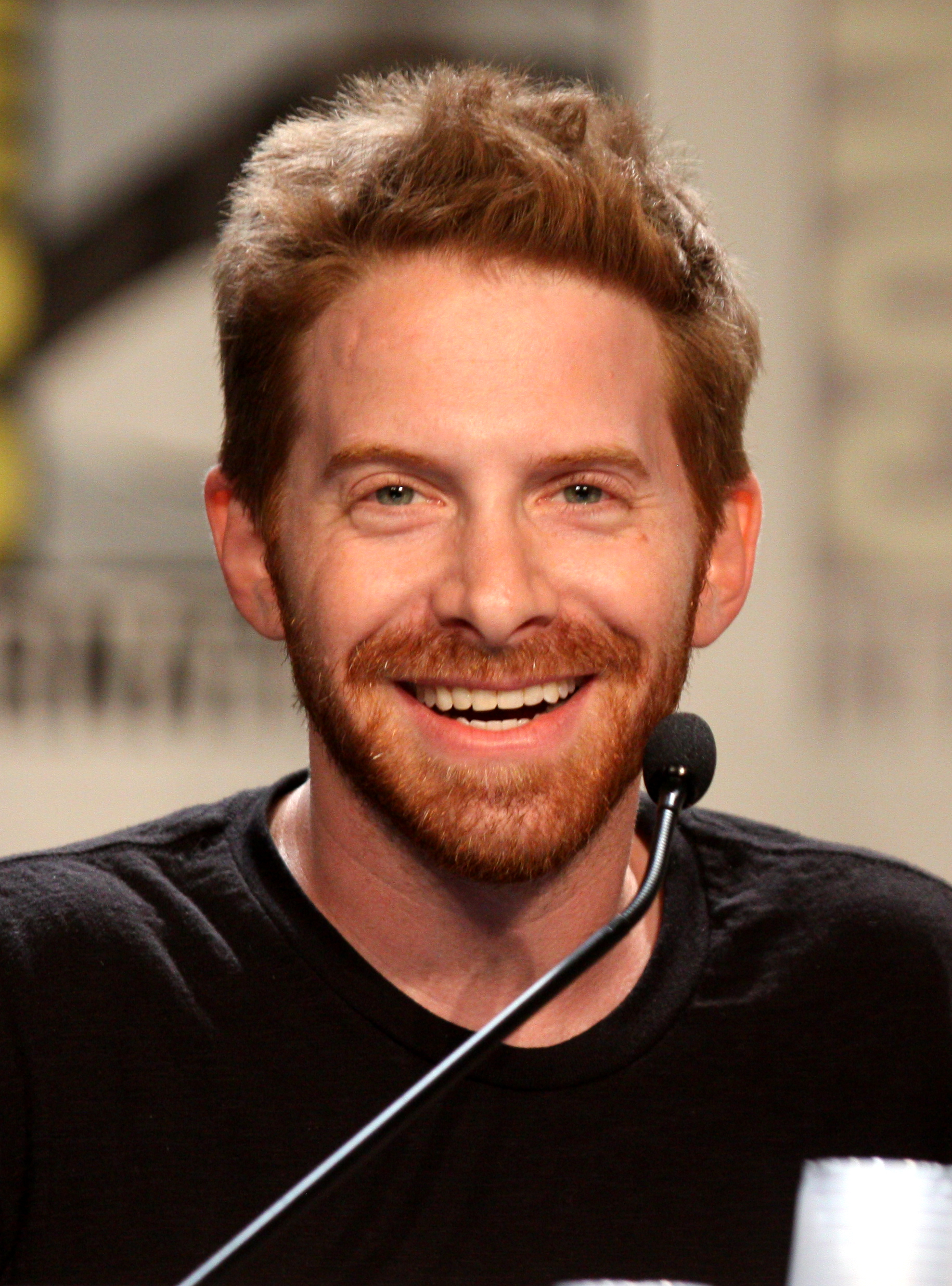
Seth Green

Robot Chicken was conceptually preceded by Twisted ToyFare Theatre, a humorous photo comic strip appearing in ToyFare. When Matthew Senreich, an editor for ToyFare, learned that Seth Green had made action figures of his castmates from Buffy the Vampire Slayer, Senreich contacted Green and asked to photograph them. Months later, Green asked Senreich to collaborate on an animated short for Late Night with Conan O'Brien, featuring toy versions of himself and O'Brien. This led to the 12-episode stop-motion series Sweet J Presents on the Sony website Screenblast.com in 2001. Conan O'Brien is voiced by Family Guy creator Seth MacFarlane in the first Sweet J Presents episode ("Conan's Big Fun").

Continuing the concept of the web series, the show creators pitched Robot Chicken as a television series, the name being inspired by a dish on the menu at a West Hollywood Chinese restaurant, Kung Pao Bistro, where Green and Senreich had dined (other ideas for the series' name included Junk in the Trunk, The Deep End, and Toyz in the Attic; some of these would be reworked into episode titles for the first season). Some television networks and sketch shows rejected the series, including Comedy Central, MTV, MADtv, Saturday Night Live, and even Cartoon Network. However, someone at that network passed the pitch along to its nighttime programming block, Adult Swim, around the same time that Seth MacFarlane told Green and Senreich to pitch the show to the channel. On February 20, 2005, the series premiered on Adult Swim.

The show was created, written, and produced by Green and Senreich and produced by ShadowMachine Films (Seasons 1–5) and Stoopid Buddy Stoodios in association with Stoop!d Monkey, Williams Street, Sony Pictures Digital (Seasons 1–5) and Sony Pictures Television (Seasons 6–10).

The program aired a 30-minute episode dedicated to Star Wars that premiered June 17, 2007, in the U.S., featuring the voices of Star Wars notables George Lucas, Mark Hamill, Billy Dee Williams, and Ahmed Best. The Star Wars episode was nominated for a 2008 Emmy Award as Outstanding Animated Program (for Programming Less Than One Hour). This was followed up with two more in 2008 and in 2010.

The series was renewed for a 20-episode third season, which ran from August 12, 2007, to October 5, 2008. After an eight-month hiatus during the third season, the show returned on September 7, 2008, to air the remaining 5 episodes. During the same time as the hiatus, both edited episodes were aired from both first two seasons based on cut segments. One particular episode was a Teen Titans/Beavis and Butt-Head crossover segment, which was previously omitted from the season one DVD, and the other was "Veggies for Sloth", which had the infamous "Archie's Final Destination" segment, which ended up becoming "Blankets in a Pig", which replaced that segment with "Citizen Spears".. The series was renewed for a fourth season, which premiered on December 7, 2008, and ended on December 6, 2009. In early 2010, the show was renewed for a fifth and sixth season (40 more episodes total). The fifth season premiered on December 12, 2010. The second group of episodes began broadcasting on October 23, 2011. The 100th episode aired on January 15, 2012. In May 2012, Adult Swim announced they were picking up a sixth season of Robot Chicken, which began airing in September 2012. The seventh season premiered on April 13, 2014. The eighth season premiered on October 25, 2015. The ninth season premiered on December 10, 2017. Season 10 premiered on September 29, 2019, containing the 200th episode. Season 11 premiered on September 6, 2021. Following the 2020 cancellation of The Venture Bros., Robot Chicken became Adult Swim's longest-running series, until it was surpassed by Aqua Teen Hunger Force after its renewal in 2023, until that was cancelled in 2025.

In July 2024, having released no new episodes since April 2022, Green announced in a live-streamed interview that, while a new full season of Robot Chicken would likely not be ready in time for the following year, a new half-hour Robot Chicken special is slated for release sometime in 2025. In a September 2024 interview, Green announced that Robot Chicken will be moving away from 20-episode seasons and towards doing more of "a South Park special model."

The Robot Chicken Self-Discovery Special was released on July 20, 2025, in honor of the series' 20th anniversary. It was based on shows from the Discovery Channel, sister channel of Adult Swim. On January 18, 2026, Aqua Teen Hunger Force co-creator Matt Maiellaro revealed on social media that he was reprising the role of his Aqua Teen character Err in the Robot Chicken special Robot Chicken Adult Swim Special which commemorated the block's 25th anniversary. The special also contained characters from other shows such as Space Ghost Coast to Coast, The Venture Bros., Harvey Birdman, Attorney at Law, Sealab 2021, Moral Orel, Assy McGee, Metalocalypse, Frisky Dingo, Rick and Morty, and Smiling Friends, among others. The special was released on August 30, 2026. A sneak preview for the special was shown during the 2026 San Diego Comic Con. Another Robot Chicken special celebrating the 35th anniversary of Cartoon Network, revealed alongside the Adult Swim special, is set to be released in 2027.

== Format ==
Robot Chicken employs stop-motion animation of toys, primarily action figures, as well as claymation and sometimes other objects, such as socks, paper bags, and popsicle sticks. Custom action figures made in the likeness of celebrities are used to portray them.

With the exception of select specials (starting with the Season 7 episode "Bitch Pudding Special"), each episode is composed of short unrelated sketches varying from a few seconds to a few minutes long. Between each sketch is a moment of static, resembling the act of channel surfing on an analog TV.

The show mocks popular culture, referencing toys, movies, television, games, popular fads, and more obscure references like anime cartoons and older television programs, much in the same vein as other comedy sketch shows as Saturday Night Live or Mad TV.

A recurring motif involves fantastical characters being placed in mundane or adult situations (such as an elderly Stretch Armstrong requiring a corn syrup transplant, Optimus Prime performing a prostate cancer PSA, and Godzilla experiencing sexual dysfunction).

== Voice cast ==
Robot Chicken features a rotating ensemble cast of recurring performers and cameos. Its most well known performers, cameos, and guest appearances include:

- Seth Green
- Matthew Senreich
- Breckin Meyer
- Seth MacFarlane
- Clare Grant
- Tom Root
- Katee Sackhoff
- Dan Milano
- Abraham Benrubi
- Chad Morgan
- Doug Goldstein
- Mike Henry
- Alex Borstein
- Mila Kunis
- Sarah Michelle Gellar
- Matthew Lillard
- Freddie Prinze Jr.
- Linda Cardellini
- Mark Hamill
- Billy Dee Williams
- Ahmed Best
- Tom Kenny
- George Lowe^{†}
- Carey Means
- Dana Snyder
- Dave Willis
- J.K. Simmons
- Henry Winkler
- Rachael Leigh Cook
- Erika Christensen
- Les Claypool
- Phil LaMarr
- Macaulay Culkin
- Elijah Wood
- Patrick Warburton
- Snoop Dogg
- Thomas Lennon
- Donald Faison
- Zachary Levi
- Amy Smart
- Ashley Tisdale
- Kelly Hu
- Nathan Fillion
- Scarlett Johansson
- Joe Lo Truglio
- Kevin Michael Richardson
- Billy West
- Dee Bradley Baker
- Fred Armisen
- Diablo Cody
- Megan Fox
- Olivia Wilde
- Alan Cumming
- Neil Patrick Harris
- Michael Ian Black
- Ludacris
- T-Pain
- CeeLo Green
- "Weird Al" Yankovic
- Kristin Chenoweth
- Harland Williams
- Adrianne Palicki
- Courtenay Taylor
- Christian Slater
- Michelle Trachtenberg^{†}
- Zac Efron
- David Lynch^{†}
- Ron Perlman
- Patrick Stewart^{†}
- Bruce Campbell
- Bob Bergen
- Bill Farmer
- Skeet Ulrich
- Dax Shepard
- Chris Pine
- Clark Duke
- Cree Summer
- Rachael MacFarlane
- Stephen Root
- Sydney Sweeney
- Jessica Barden
- Sam Elliott
- Annie Murphy
- Brett Goldstein
- Ashton Kutcher
- Randall Park
- Ken Jeong
- Alison Brie
- Jon Hamm
- Bryan Cranston
- Rob Paulsen
- Frank Welker
- George Lucas
- Doc Hammer
- Jackson Publick
- Zach Hadel
- Michael Cusack
- Quinton Flynn
- Jim Cummings
- Keith David
- Phyllis Diller^{†}
- Don Knotts^{†}
- Gary Coleman^{†}
- Burt Reynolds^{†}
- Dom DeLuise^{†}

== Episodes ==
Series overview
Season	Episodes	Originally released	
Season	Episodes	First released	Last released
1	20	February 20, 2005	July 17, 2005
2	20	April 2, 2006	November 19, 2006
3	20	August 12, 2007	October 5, 2008
4	20	December 7, 2008	December 6, 2009
5	20	December 12, 2010	January 16, 2012
6	20	September 17, 2012	February 17, 2013
7	20	April 13, 2014	December 7, 2014
8	20	October 25, 2015	May 15, 2016
9	20	December 10, 2017	July 22, 2018
10	20	September 30, 2019	July 27, 2020
11	20	September 7, 2021	April 11, 2022

== Syndication ==
All Robot Chicken episodes from seasons 1–11 are available on HBO Max. The show is streamed censored on the service until season 5.

The show aired on TBS for a short time in October 2014.

== Advertising ==
Robot Chicken has partnered with various brands to produce television advertisements, including KFC in 2015, Burger King in 2017, and most recently, Kellogg's Pop-Tarts in 2023. It also produced the 2026 schedule announcement for the Green Bay Packers.

== Home media ==
DVD title	Release date			Ep #	Discs
DVD title	Region 1	Region 2	Region 4	Ep #	Discs
The Complete First Season	March 28, 2006	September 29, 2008	April 4, 2007	1–20	2
This two-disc boxset includes all 20 episodes from Season 1 in production order. While it contains many sketches that were edited from the TV airings, several of the original Sony Screenblast webtoons, and the words "Jesus" and "Christ" as an oath unbleeped (though "fuck" and "shit" are still censored out), the episodes are not all uncut. One particular segment that featured the Teen Titans meeting Beavis and Butt-Head was omitted from the DVD because of legal problems. The Voltron/You Got Served sketch shown on the DVD has a replacement song because of legal issues over the song that was used on the TV version. At a performance of Family Guy Live in Chicago, during the Q&A session that ends each performance, Seth Green was asked how they came up with the name Robot Chicken. He explained that the title of each episode was a name Adult Swim rejected for the name of the show. A Region 2 version of the set was released in the UK on September 29, 2008. Three edited shorts from Sweet J Presents were included on the Robot Chicken Season 1 DVD boxset.
The Complete Second Season	September 4, 2007	September 28, 2009	November 11, 2007	21–40	2
This two-disc boxset includes all 20 episodes from Season 2 in production order and uncensored, with the words "fuck" and "shit" uncensored (except for one instance in the episode "Easter Basket" in the Lego sketch). It is currently available for download on iTunes (though the episode "Veggies for Sloth" is absent because of copyright issues involving the "Archie's Final Destination" segment). Seth Green stated at Comic-Con 2006 that the second DVD set will contain the "Beavis and Butt-Head Join Teen Titans" sketch, which had been removed from the first DVD set because of copyright issues. However, the sketch is absent from the DVD (although it is available on iTunes). Bonus features include the Christmas special. A secret Nerf gun fight can be found on the disc 1 extras menu and pushing "up" over the extras and set-up items on the menu reveals more special features.
Star Wars Special	July 22, 2008	August 11, 2008	August 6, 2008	1	1
This single DVD features the Star Wars special in its TV-edited version (i.e. with bleeps in place of profane words) and several extras about the crew and their work on the special, including a photo gallery, alternate audio, and an easter egg demonstrating the crew's difficulty in composing a proper musical score for the sketch "Empire on Ice". It also features various audio commentaries, featuring members of the cast and crew.
The Complete Third Season	October 7, 2008	January 25, 2010	December 3, 2008	41–60	2
This two-disc boxset includes all 20 episodes from Season 3 in production order. This DVD is uncensored, except for visual censorship of the "Cat in the Hat" sketch from episode 7 on Disc 1. It also intentionally censored in episode 5 in the "Law and Order: KFC" sketch. This DVD has special features such as deleted scenes and animatics. It also includes commentary for all of the episodes and has "Chicken Nuggets" commentary for episodes 1 and 3–5. The bonus features also include a gag reel and audio takes.
Star Wars Episode II	July 21, 2009	July 27, 2009	August 5, 2009	1	1
This single DVD features the main Star Wars special extras, including normal Robot Chicken episodes and common DVD extras; "The Making Of"; and deleted scenes.
The Complete Fourth Season	December 15, 2009	August 30, 2010	December 2, 2009	61–80	2
This two-disc boxset includes all 20 episodes from Season 4 in production order. The special features include "Chicken Nuggets", a San Diego Comic-Con '08 panel, "Day in the Life", a New York Comic-Con '09 panel, video blogs, "Australia Visit", alternate audio, deleted scenes, deleted animations, and commentary on all 20 episodes.
Star Wars Episode III	July 12, 2011	July 4, 2011	August 3, 2011	1	1
Interview with George Lucas, "Chicken Nuggets" (sketch by sketch video commentary), Behind the Scenes, Voice Recording Featurette, Star Wars Celebration V Robot Chicken Panel, Skywalker Ranch Premiere Trip, Writer's Room Featurette, Deleted Animatics w/video intros, Audio Commentaries.
The Complete Fifth Season	October 25, 2011	TBA	November 30, 2011	81–100	2
This two-disc boxset includes all 20 episodes from Season 5 in production order. Nine of the episodes were previously unaired before the DVD release. The set includes commentary on all episodes, "Chicken Nuggets" on a few episodes and a featurette on episode 100. Deleted scenes and deleted animations are also included. Among the deleted scenes are the sketches "Beavis and Butt-Head Join Teen Titans" (deleted from Season 1 due to copyright issues) and the "Archie's Final Destination" sketch (deleted from Season 2 sets).
DC Comics Special	July 9, 2013	TBA	September 18, 2013	1	1
The Making of the RCDC Special, RCDC's Aquaman Origin Story, Chicken Nuggets, Writers' Commentary, Actors' Commentary, DC Entertainment Tour, Stoopid Alter Egos, Outtakes, Cut Sketches, 5.2 Questions.
DC Comics Special 2: Villains in Paradise	October 14, 2014	TBA	February 18, 2015	1	1
The second set of specials parodying DC Superheroes. Special features include the making of RCDC2VIP, "Bad Hair, Musical Numbers and Sequels", "The Ones That Got Away", "20 Questions", "Chicken Nuggets", cut animatics, cut sketches, actors' commentary and writers' commentary.
The Complete Sixth Season	October 8, 2013	TBA	November 20, 2013	101–120	2
This two-disc boxset includes all 20 episodes from Season 6 in production order. Special features include commentary on every episode, deleted animatics, featurettes, deleted scenes, channel flips and "Chicken Nuggets".
Christmas Specials	November 18, 2014	TBA	TBA	6	1
This DVD contains 6 Christmas-themed episodes: "Robot Chicken's Christmas Special", "Robot Chicken's Half-Assed Christmas Special", "Dear Consumer (Robot Chicken's Full-Assed Christmas Special)", "Robot Chicken's DP Christmas Special", "Robot Chicken's ATM Christmas Special" and "Born Again Virgin Christmas Special". Special features include commentaries, deleted scenes, deleted animatics and "long-forgotten" promos.
Star Wars Trilogy	TBA	December 4, 2015	February 4, 2015	3	3
The Complete Seventh Season	July 21, 2015	December 11, 2020	September 16, 2015	121–140	2
This two-disc boxset includes all 20 episodes from Season 7 in production order. Special features include commentary on every episode, featurettes and cut sketches.
Robot Chicken DC Comics Special (collection)	March 2018	December 2, 2016	June 20, 2018	3	3
The Robot Chicken Walking Dead Special: Look Who's Walking	March 27, 2018	TBA	August 15, 2018	1	1
Inside the Robot Chicken Walking Dead Special: Look Who's Walking, Cut Sketches, Commentary, Sketches to Die For, Bawkward, Behind the Screams.
The Complete Eighth Season	TBA	March 26, 2021	April 17, 2019	141–160	2
The Complete Ninth Season	TBA	March 15, 2019	May 22, 2019	161–180	2
The Complete Series	October 21, 2025	TBA	TBA	1–228	TBA

Revolver Entertainment have released the first four seasons and all three Star Wars specials on DVD in the United Kingdom. A box set including the first three seasons and a box set including all three Star Wars specials have also been released. Madman Entertainment has released the first nine seasons of Robot Chicken and specials on DVD in Australia and New Zealand.

Adult Swim released Robot Chicken: The Complete Series for digital purchase on iTunes and Vudu in July 2023. A Robot Chicken: The Complete Series DVD set was released on October 21, 2025.

== International broadcast ==
The series airs in the United Kingdom and Ireland as part of E4's Adult Swim block, in Canada on Adult Swim (previously Teletoon's Teletoon at Night block from 2006 to 2019) and also in Quebec on Télétoon's Télétoon la nuit block, in Australia on The Comedy Channel's Adult Swim block, in Russia on 2x2's Adult Swim block, in Germany on WarnerTV Comedy's Adult Swim block (previously TNT Series' Adult Swim block from 2009 to 2017), and in Latin America on the I.Sat Adult Swim block (after the Adult Swim block was canceled from Cartoon Network Latin America in 2008).
