= Chad Morgan (actress) =

American actress (born 1973)

- Born: September 21, 1973 (age 53); Atlanta, Georgia, U.S.
- Occupation: Actress

Chad Morgan (born September 21, 1973) is an American actress best known for her voice-over work on Adult Swim's Robot Chicken series, where she performs the voices of celebrities.

In addition to appearing in a 2008 episode of the hit Fox series House, M.D., Morgan has appeared on television series including The Guardian, Cold Case, Family Guy, Stargate Atlantis, and all three shows in the CSI franchise. She had a recurring role on the series The District throughout its four-year run, and has appeared in feature films, most notably playing a small role in the 2001 blockbuster Pearl Harbor.

== Celebrities voiced ==
Celebrities Chad Morgan has voiced and/or impersonated include:

- Christina Aguilera
- Gillian Anderson (as Dana Scully from The X-Files)
- Laura Bush
- Hillary Clinton
- Katie Couric
- Hilary Duff
- Barbara Eden (as Jeannie from I Dream of Jeannie)
- Estelle Getty (as Sophia Petrillo from The Golden Girls)
- Daryl Hannah (as Elle Driver from Kill Bill)
- Teri Hatcher
- Florence Henderson (as Carol Brady from The Brady Bunch)
- Kristin Holt
- Bryce Dallas Howard (as Ivy Elizabeth Walker from The Village)
- Maureen McCormick (as Marcia Brady from The Brady Bunch)
- Ashley Olsen
- Betsy Ross
- J. K. Rowling
- Ashlee Simpson
- Jamie Lynn Spears
- Tiffani Thiessen (as Kelly Kapowski from Saved by the Bell)

== Filmography ==
=== Features ===
- Pearl Harbor (2001) .... Pearl Harbor Nurse
- The Purge: Anarchy (2014)
- The Grace of Jake (2015)

=== Television ===
- Weird Science (1 episode, "Teen Lisa", 1995) .... Heather
- Co-ed Call Girl (1996) (TV) .... Tracy
- The War at Home (1996) .... Bus Station Clerk
- Chicago Hope (1 episode, "The Lung and the Restless", 1997) .... Nina Burke
- Whatever (1998) .... Brenda Talbot
- Brimstone (1 episode, "Heat", 1998) .... Gwendolyn DeBare
- Kilroy (1999) (TV) .... Jane
- Boy Meets World (1 episode, "The Truth About Honesty", 1999) .... Dana
- Promised Land (1 episode, "Baby Steps", 1999) .... Vicki
- Wasteland (1 episode, "My Ex-friends Wedding", 1999) .... Gwen
- Picnic (2000) (TV) .... Millie Owens
- Diagnosis: Murder (1 episode, "Being of Sound Mind", 2001) .... Ingrid Thurston
- Taken (3 episodes, "High Hopes", "Maintenance" and "Charlie and Lisa", 2002) .... Becky Clarke - Adult
- CSI: Crime Scene Investigation (1 episode, "One Hit Wonder", 2003) .... Joanne Crooks
- The District (7 episodes, "The Santa Wars", "A Southern Town", "Cop Hunt", "This Too Shall Pass", "Daughter for Daughter", "Party Favors" and "Something Borrowed, Something Bruised", 2000–2004) .... Beth Mannion
- The Guardian (3 episodes, "Sparkle", "Remember" and "Antarctica", 2004) .... Emily Bernsley
- Helter Skelter (2004) (TV) .... Suzanne LaBianca
- Cold Case (1 episode, "Factory Girls", 2004) .... Alice Miller 1943
- Robot Chicken (26 episodes, 2005–2008) .... Various (voice)
- Stargate Atlantis (1 episode, "Epiphany", 2005) .... Teer
- Wanted (2 episodes, "Badlands" and "Judas", 2005) .... Dana Fontana
- Family Guy (1 episode, "You May Now Kiss the... Uh... Guy Who Receives", 2006) .... Alyssa (voice)
- CSI: Miami (1 episode, "Going Under", 2006) .... Suzanne McCarthy
- CSI: NY (1 episode, "Obsession", 2007) .... Liz Grayson
- Robot Chicken: Star Wars (2007) (TV) .... Various (voice)
- House, M.D. (1 episode, "No More Mr. Nice Guy", 2008) .... Deb
- Wilfred (1 episode, "Isolation") .... Maggie
- Ghost Whisperer (1 episode, "Leap of Faith") .... Clarissa Webb
