= Tamara Garfield =

American actress

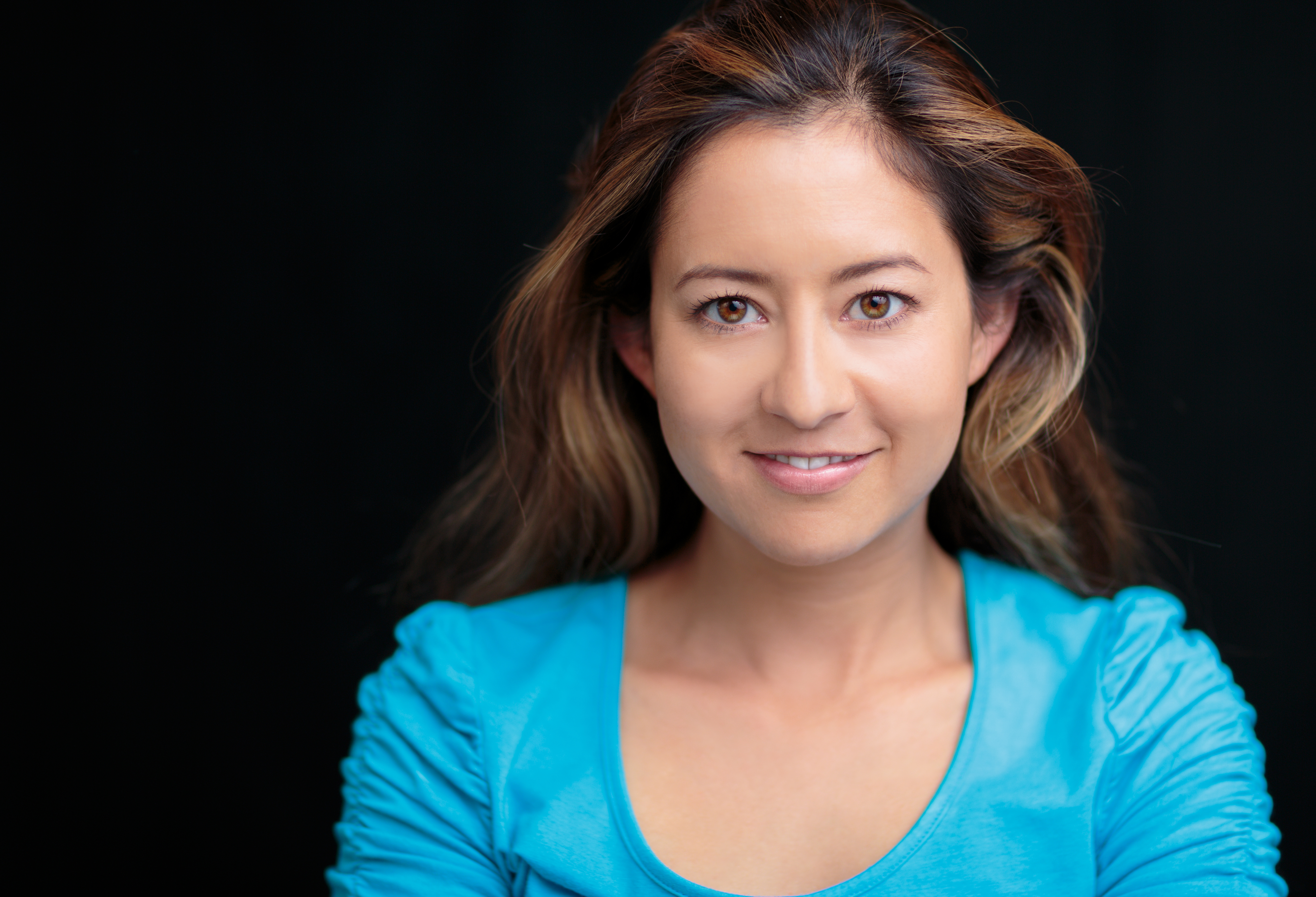
Tamara Garfield Headshot

Tamara Garfield is an American actress, comedian, director and screenwriter.

She is a recurring actor on Adult Swim's Robot Chicken. Tamara is the voice of the lead girl dog "Callie" in the feature film Rescue Dogs.

== Career ==
Garfield appeared on a variety of television shows including Mad and The Minor Accomplishments of Jackie Woodman. On the Robot Chicken Season 2 DVD, creators Seth Green and Matthew Senreich featured Tamara in the DVD extras section.

Garfield was a pageant winner crowned Ms. Congeniality California 2014. After becoming Ms. Playa Del Rey United States, she earned a Top 3 finish at the Ms. California United States Pageant and won the Congeniality Award. Previously she was "Miss Tam Valley, USA" competing in the 2010 Miss California USA Pageant in Palm Springs California.

She is the winner of the 2012 Bill Johnson's Big Apple Comedy Contest. The company closed on May 24, 2015. She has appeared in comedy clubs in both the US and Europe.

Garfield wrote and directed a short film called Snowbirds, that tells the story of a pair of quarreling seniors who decide to shake up their relationship with an RV journey. Along the way, they discover the best cure for an ailing marriage is migration. The short stars real life Phoenix couple, Dell and Harry Herts. The film was shown at the San Tan Film Festival in Arizona.

Garfield appears in the 2011 music video for "End to the Lies" by Jane's Addiction.

She has as appeared as a model in fashion campaigns for Certified Me, Hyper Fem and Erzulinea for FredaLA
