= 18th Dye =

German/Danish rock band

- Origin: Germany / Denmark
- Genres: Noise rock, alternative rock
- Years active: 1992–2009
- Labels: Matador (1994–1995); Cloudland (1995–1999); Crunchy Frog (2007–2009)
- Members: Sebastian Büttrich; Heike Rädeker; Piet Breinholm-Bendtsen

18th Dye was a Berlin-based German/Danish noise rock band formed in 1992 by Sebastian Büttrich (vocals, guitar), Heike Rädeker (vocals, bass) and Piet Breinholm-Bendtsen (drums). They broke up in 1999 after two albums and an EP, but reformed in 2005. A third album, Amorine Queen, was released in 2008 but they split up again in 2009.

== Biography ==
Drone-heavy, fuzzed out debut LP Done, produced by Iain Burgess (Naked Raygun, Ministry, Big Black), was released in Germany in 1992 before the band gained a recording and distribution deal with US Independent label Matador Records in 1994, having been championed by Yo La Tengo. The self-produced six song EP Crayon followed in 1994.

In 1995, 18th Dye moved to Danish label Cloudland Records and recorded their second album, Tribute to a Bus, recorded by Steve Albini at Black Box Recording Studio in Noyant-La-Gravoyère, France. More dynamic and diverse than previous recordings, its blend of noise and melody suggest influences such as Sonic Youth, The Wedding Present and Wire. It is characterised by oblique English-as-second-language, maths based lyrics.

"Poolhouse Blue"
"Poolhouse Blue" features vocals from bassist Heike Rädeker

The band recorded three Peel sessions: in July 1994, March 1995 and February 1999. They broke up in 1999 with Büttrich and Breinholm-Bendtsen going on to form Kikkert and later Test, while Rädeker has played with the bands Evonike and Wuhling. They reformed in the summer of 2005 and have begun to debut new songs at recent shows around Europe. In November 2007, 18th Dye signed a new recording contract with Danish-based record label Crunchy Frog Records (The Raveonettes, Junior Senior, Heavy Trash, PowerSolo, The Naked, epo-555).

In 2008, a third album Amorine Queen was released and the band toured the US before breaking up again in 2009. A press statement said of the split "It is not possible for us to compose, create and act as a band any more. We have decided to stop the band at this point.

After the split Breinholm-Bendtsen established a company in Copenhagen where he designs leather bags.

== Discography ==
=== Albums/EPs ===
- Done – 1992
- Crayon (EP) – 1993
- Tribute to a Bus – 1995
- Left (compilation) – 1998
- Amorine Queen – 2008

=== Singles ===
- Whole Wide World / Fragile Stars – 1994
- Dive / Coffee Cup Revisited – 1994
- Dive / Can You Wink? / Plumbing & Soon Forgetting – 1994
- Play W/ You / Gout S.F. / F. – 1995
