= Rhythm Bandits =

2003 single by Junior Senior

Single by Junior Senior

from the album D-D-Don't Stop the Beat
- Released: 28 July 2003
- Length: 2:48 (album version)
- Label: Crunchy Frog, Mercury
- Songwriter: Junior
- Producers: Thomas Troelsen, Junior

Junior Senior singles chronology
"Move Your Feet" (2002)	"Rhythm Bandits" (2003)	"Shake Your Coconuts" (2003)

Music video
- "Rhythm Bandits" on YouTube

"Rhythm Bandits" is a song by Danish band Junior Senior. It was released as the second single from their 2002 debut album, D-D-Don't Don't Stop the Beat, on 28 July 2003 but failed to match the success of previous single "Move Your Feet". Although the song did chart, peaking at number 22 in the United Kingdom and number 47 in Australia and Ireland, it was the last charting song for Junior Senior, whose album Hey Hey My My Yo Yo was not released in the UK, a fact that angered the group's fanbase. The song was accompanied by a music video, which was directed by the production company The Imaginary Tennis Club (consisting of Nima Nourizadeh and Simon Owens).

== Charts ==
Weekly chart performance for "Rhythm Bandits"
Chart (2003–2004)	Peak position
Australia (ARIA)	47
Ireland (IRMA)	47
Ireland Dance (IRMA)	9
Scotland Singles (Official Charts)	13
Switzerland (Schweizer Hitparade)	68
UK Singles (Official Charts)	22
UK Dance (Official Charts)	5

== Release history ==
Release dates and formats for "Rhythm Bandits"
Region	Date	Format(s)	Label(s)	Ref.
United Kingdom	28 July 2003	12-inch vinyl; CD; cassette	Mercury	
Australia	16 February 2004	CD	Epic	
