= Say Hello, Wave Goodbye (EP) =

EP by Junior Senior
- Released: 21 August 2007
- Recorded: 2006–2007
- Genre: House
- Label: Crunchy Frog
- Producer: Junior Senior

Junior Senior chronology
Hey Hey My My Yo Yo (2005)	Say Hello, Wave Goodbye (2007)

Say Hello, Wave Goodbye is an EP by Danish pop duo Junior Senior.

Released in 2007, it is the duo's second EP release after Boy Meets Girl in 2003. It is their last release before their breakup in 2008.

The EP was released with some repackages of the duo's second studio album, Hey Hey My My Yo Yo.

== Track listing ==
1. "Stranded on an Island Alone" – 5:26
2. "Together for One Last Dance" – 4:49
3. "Headphone Song" – 5:01
4. "I Can't Rap, I Can't Sing But I Would Do Anything" – 4:42
5. "Simple Minds Do Simple Things" – 4:14
6. "Simple Minds Do Simple Things Part 2" – 2:59
7. "U and Me" – 3:43
8. "Anja Andersen" – 3:41

== Charts ==
Chart performance for Say Hello, Wave Goodbye
Chart (2007)	Peak position
Denmark (Tracklisten)	5
