= Move Your Feet =

2002 single by Junior Senior

Single by Junior Senior

from the album D-D-Don't Don't Stop the Beat
- B-side: "Coconuts" (movie edit); "Chicks and Dicks"
- Released: 10 June 2002
- Studio: Delta Lab (Copenhagen, Denmark)
- Genre: Dance-punk
- Length: 3:00
- Label: Crunchy Frog
- Songwriter: Junior
- Producers: Junior; Thomas Troelsen

Junior Senior singles chronology
"Move Your Feet" (2002)	"Rhythm Bandits" (2003)

Music video
- "Move Your Feet" on YouTube

"Move Your Feet" is a song by Danish pop duo Junior Senior from their debut studio album, D-D-Don't Don't Stop the Beat (2002). The song, originally released in June 2002 in the duo's native Denmark, was issued worldwide in 2003 and became Junior Senior's biggest hit, reaching No. 4 in Denmark, No. 3 in the United Kingdom, and No. 20 in Australia, where it was ranked number 87 on the Triple J Hottest 100 countdown of 2003. A music video for the song, directed by British art collective Shynola, was created using low-resolution pixel art. The song was sampled in Nicki Minaj's 2024 song "Everybody".

== Chart performance ==
The song proved to be successful in the United Kingdom, where it peaked at number three on the UK Singles Chart for two non-consecutive weeks, going on to become Britain's 16th-best-selling single of 2003. It reached number four on the Danish Singles Chart and number 10 in Ireland. It was a moderate hit in Australia, peaking at number 20. In 2013, the song re-entered the French Singles Chart at number 11.

== Music video ==
This song was accompanied by an animated music video by British art collective Shynola, using low-resolution (90×72) pixel art produced using Deluxe Paint. The video features animated characters of the members of Junior Senior, dancing figures, and personified inanimate objects, as well as Abraham Lincoln in the closing seconds of the video.

== Track listings ==
Danish CD single

1. "Move Your Feet" (radio edit) – 2:59
2. "Coconuts" (movie edit) – 2:39
3. "Move Your Feet" (Djosos Krost remix) – 6:34
4. "Move Your Feet" (extended play) – 4:16

European CD single

1. "Move Your Feet" (radio edit) – 2:59
2. "Move Your Feet" (extended play) – 4:16

European maxi-CD single

1. "Move Your Feet" (radio edit) – 2:59
2. "Move Your Feet" (extended play) – 4:16
3. "Move Your Feet" (Filur Move the Club) – 6:20
4. "Move Your Feet" (Filur Dark String dub) – 6:51
5. "Move Your Feet" (video enhanced) – 2:59

UK CD single

1. "Move Your Feet" – 2:59
2. "Chicks and Dicks" – 2:32
3. "Move Your Feet" (Kurtis Mantronik club mix) – 6:02
4. "Move Your Feet" (video)

UK 12-inch single

A1. "Move Your Feet" (Kurtis Mantronik club mix) – 6:02
B1. "Move Your Feet" (Krafty Kuts remix) – 6:14
B2. "Move Your Feet" (extended play) – 4:17

UK cassette single

1. "Move Your Feet" – 2:59
2. "Chicks and Dicks" – 2:32
3. "Move Your Feet" (Kurtis Mantronik club mix) – 6:02

US 12-inch single

A1. "Move Your Feet" (extended play)
A2. "Move Your Feet" (radio edit)
B1. "Move Your Feet" (Djosos Krost remix)
B2. "Cocodub"

US 12-inch single (remixes)

A1. "Move Your Feet" (Rascal Madness mix) – 4:51
A2. "Move Your Feet" (Rascal Beats) – 2:46
A3. "Move Your Feet" (Rascal edit) – 2:46
B1. "Move Your Feet" (Rascal extended club mix) – 4:51
B2. "Move Your Feet" (Rascal bonus dub) – 2:48
B3. "Move Your Feet" (original radio edit) – 2:59

Australian CD single

1. "Move Your Feet" (radio edit) – 3:01
2. "Move Your Feet" (extended play) – 4:16
3. "Move Your Feet" (Kurtis Mantronik club mix) – 6:04
4. "Coconuts" (movie edit) – 2:39

== Credits and personnel ==
Credits are lifted from the D-D-Don't Don't Stop the Beat liner notes.

Studios

- Recorded at Delta Lab (Copenhagen, Denmark)
- Additional mix and recording at Tambourine Studios (Malmö, Sweden)
- Mastered at Tocano (Copenhagen, Denmark)

Personnel

- Junior – vocals, writing, guitar, production, additional mix and recording (Delta Lab)
- Senior – vocals, handclaps
- Thomas Troelsen – vocals, backing vocals, bass, keys, drums, production, mixing, engineering
- Anna Køster – backing vocals
- Yebo – backing vocals
- Lars Vognstrup – backing vocals
- Signe-Marie Jacobsen – backing vocals
- Sara Wölck – backing vocals
- Jesper Reginal – mixing, additional engineering
- Per Sunding – additional mix and recording (Tambourine)
- The Great Nalna – editing
- Morten Bue – mastering

== Charts ==
=== Weekly charts ===
Chart (2002–2003)	Peak position
Australia (ARIA)	20
Australian Dance (ARIA)	2
Belgium (Ultratip Bubbling Under Flanders)	3
Belgium (Ultratip Bubbling Under Wallonia)	6
Denmark (Tracklisten)	4
Europe (Eurochart Hot 100)	8
France (SNEP)	29
Germany (GfK)	43
Greece (IFPI)	12
Hungary (Rádiós Top 40)	30
Hungary (Dance Top 40)	39
Hungary (Single Top 40)	7
Ireland (IRMA)	10
Ireland Dance (IRMA)	2
Italy (FIMI)	45
Netherlands (Dutch Top 40)	7
Netherlands (Single Top 100)	18
Romania (Romanian Top 100)	18
Scottish Singles Sales (Official Charts)	5
Sweden (Sverigetopplistan)	22
Switzerland (Schweizer Hitparade)	10
UK Singles (Official Charts)	3
UK Dance (Official Charts)	1
US Dance Club Songs (Billboard)	45
US Dance Singles Sales (Billboard)	22
US Dance Airplay (Billboard)	8

Chart (2013)	Peak position
France (SNEP)	11

=== Year-end charts ===
Chart (2002)	Position
Netherlands (Dutch Top 40)	57

Chart (2003)	Position
Australian Dance (ARIA)	17
Ireland (IRMA)	71
Switzerland (Schweizer Hitparade)	49
UK Singles (OCC)	16

== Certifications ==
Region	Certification	Certified units/sales
New Zealand (RMNZ)	Platinum	30,000^{‡}
United Kingdom (BPI)	Platinum	600,000^{‡}
^{‡} Sales+streaming figures based on certification alone.

== Release history ==
Region	Date	Format(s)	Label(s)	Ref.
Denmark	10 June 2002	CD	Crunchy Frog	
United Kingdom	17 February 2003	12-inch vinyl; CD; cassette	Crunchy Frog; Mercury	
Australia	20 October 2003	CD	Epic	
