= Hey Hey My My Yo Yo =

Studio album by Junior Senior
- Released: 24 August 2005
- Studios: Gula Studion (Malmö, Sweden); Delta Lab (Copenhagen, Denmark)
- Length: 34:20
- Label: Crunchy Frog
- Producer: Jesper Mortensen

Junior Senior chronology
D-D-Don't Don't Stop the Beat (2002)	Hey Hey My My Yo Yo (2005)	Say Hello, Wave Goodbye (2007)

Singles from Hey Hey My My Yo Yo
- 1. "Itch U Can't Skratch" Released: 7 March 2005

Hey Hey My My Yo Yo is the second and final studio album by Danish pop duo Junior Senior. It was originally released in Japan and parts of Europe on 24 August 2005 through Crunchy Frog Records, and was later released in Australia and the United States in 2007.

== Release ==
Hey Hey My My Yo Yo was released in Japan and Scandinavia in 2005. Hey Hey My My Yo Yo was successful in Japan, charting at number two on the Japanese music charts. The American version of the album was released by Rykodisc Records on 14 August 2007. This release of the album included a seven-song bonus EP. In 2007, Hey Hey My My Yo Yo peaked at number five on the Billboard Top Electronic Albums chart.

== Reception ==
Professional ratings
Aggregate scores
Source	Rating
Metacritic	80/100
Review scores
Source	Rating
AllMusic	4.5/5 stars
The A.V. Club	A−
Blender	3.5/5 stars
Entertainment Weekly	A−
Pitchfork	7.9/10
PopMatters	7/10
Rolling Stone	3/5 stars
Slant Magazine	4/5 stars
Spin	4/5 stars
Stylus Magazine	B−

Initial critical response to Hey Hey My My Yo Yo was very positive. At Metacritic, which assigns a normalized rating out of 100 to reviews from mainstream critics, the album has received an average score of 80, based on 14 reviews.

== Track listing ==
All tracks are written by Jesper "Junior" Mortensen, except where noted

Hey Hey My My Yo Yo track listing
No.	Title	Writer(s)	Length
1.	"Hello"		0:43
2.	"Hip Hop a Lula"	Mortensen, Ivory Hunter, Otis Clyde	3:12
3.	"Can I Get Get Get"		3:12
4.	"Take My Time"		3:49
5.	"Itch U Can't Skratch"		3:06
6.	"We R the Handclaps"		3:01
7.	"I Like Music (W.O.S.B.)"		3:43
8.	"Ur a Girl"		3:01
9.	"No No No's"		3:47
10.	"Dance, Chance, Romance"		3:23
11.	"Happy Rap"		3:22

All tracks are written by Jesper "Junior" Mortensen

Say Hello, Wave Goodbye EP
No.	Title	Length
1.	"Stranded on an Island Alone"	5:27
2.	"Together for One Last Dance"	4:50
3.	"Headphone Song"	5:02
4.	"I Can't Rap, I Can't Sing, But I Would Do Anything"	4:43
5.	"Simple Minds Do Simple Things"	4:15
6.	"Simple Minds Do Simple Things Part 2"	3:00
7.	"U and Me"	3:44
8.	"[Bonus track]"	3:42

== Personnel ==
- Jesper "Junior" Mortensen – vocals, guitars and synthesizers on all tracks; percussion on all tracks except 6; bass guitar on track 11; harmonica on track 8; harpsichord on track 8; piano on tracks 8, 9 and 10; kazoo on track 10; handclaps, stomps
- Jeppe "Senior" Laursen – vocals, handclaps, stomps
- Thomas Troelsen – synthesizer on track 6; harpsichord on track 9; percussion on track 6; drum fills on tracks 7, 8 and 9; piano on track 8; handclaps
- The Velvelettes – backing vocals on tracks 1, 2, 3, 6, 7 and 8
- Carolyn Gill – vocals on track 6
- Bertha Barbee – vocals on track 5
- Le Tigre – backing vocals on tracks 1 and 3
- Johanna Fateman – vocals on track 5
- JD Samson – vocals on track 3
- Kathleen Hanna – vocals on track 10
- Cindy Wilson – vocals on track 4
- Kate Pierson – vocals on track 4
- Anna Køster – backing vocals on tracks 5, 6, 9 and 11; handclaps on tracks 1, 2, 3, 4, 5 and 7
- Joy Hoyle – backing vocals on track 11
- Rasmus Kihlberg – drums on tracks 4, 7, 8, 9 and 10
- Bjørn Joensson – drums on tracks 2, 3, 5, 6 and 11
- Mats Ingvarsson – bass on all tracks except 10 and 11
- Jens Lindgård, Petter Lindgård and Sven Andersson - horns on tracks 2, 5 and 7
- Filip Runesson – strings on all tracks except 10 and 11
- Spooner Oldham – piano on track 10
- Rune Kjeldsen – acoustic guitar on track 9
- Mads Nørgaard – handclaps on track 7
- Lars Vognstrup – handclaps on track 11

=== Production ===
- Jesper "Junior" Mortensen – producer and arranger
- Thomas Troelsen – co-producer
- Jens Lindgård – recorder
- Thomas T – recorder
- David Leonard – audio mixing
- Bernie Grundman – mastering
- Sune P.L. Christiansen – album cover
- Martin Dennis – layout
- Marc Flori – cover photos
- Jeppe "Senior" Laursen – inside photo

== Charts ==
Chart performance for Hey Hey My My Yo Yo
Chart (2005–2007)	Peak position
Danish Albums (Hitlisten)	20
US Top Dance Albums (Billboard)	5
