= Malpractice (disambiguation) =

Malpractice is a type of tort.

Malpractice may also refer to:

== Music ==
- The Malpractice (band), a project of Danish songwriter Johannes Gammelby
- Malpractice, a 1970s American band co-founded by GG Allin
- Malpractice (Dr. Feelgood album), 1975
- Malpractice (Redman album), 2001
- "Malpractice", a song by Faith No More from Angel Dust, 1992

== Other media ==
- Malpractice (film), a 1989 Australian film
- Malpractice, a 2001 film produced by Anita Gershman
- "Malpractice" (short story), by Orson Scott Card
- Malpractice (TV series), a 2023 ITV drama series
