= Love Is a Four Letter Word =

Love Is a Four Letter Word may refer to:

- Love Is a Four Letter Word (album), an album by Jason Mraz
- Love is a Four Letter Word (book), 1958 book by Anita Rowe Block
- Love Is a Four Letter Word (TV series), an Australian TV series broadcast by ABC
- "Love Is a Four-Letter Word", an episode of The Janice Dickinson Modeling Agency
- Four-letter word, for other uses of the term

== See also ==
- "Love Is Just a Four-Letter Word", a song by Bob Dylan, notably recorded by Joan Baez
- "Love Is Not a Four Letter Word", a song by Raury from All We Need
- "Love Ain't Nothing But a Four Letter Word", a song by Bon Jovi released on the album 100,000,000 Bon Jovi Fans Can't Be Wrong
- "Love Ain't Just a Four Letter Word", a song by Jenny Wilson released on the album Love and Youth
