= D-D-Don't Don't Stop the Beat =

Studio album by Junior Senior
- Released: 4 March 2002
- Recorded: 2001–2002
- Studios: Delta Lab (Copenhagen, Denmark)
- Genres: Alternative rock; alternative dance; garage rock
- Length: 32:26
- Labels: Crunchy Frog; Mercury (UK); Atlantic (US)
- Producers: Jesper Mortensen; Thomas Troelsen

Junior Senior chronology
| D-D-Don't Don't Stop the Beat (2002) | Boy Meets Girl (2003) |

Singles from D-D-Don't Don't Stop the Beat
- 1. "Move Your Feet" Released: 10 June 2002; 2. "Rhythm Bandits" Released: 28 July 2003; 3. "Shake Your Coconuts" Released: 2 November 2003

Professional ratings
Aggregate scores
| Source | Rating |
|---|---|
| Metacritic | 79/100 |
Review scores
| Source | Rating |
| AllMusic | 4/5 stars |
| Blender | 4/5 stars |
| Entertainment Weekly | A− |
| The Guardian | 3/5 stars |
| Los Angeles Times | 3/4 stars |
| Pitchfork | 7.6/10 |
| Q | 4/5 stars |
| Spin | B− |
| Uncut | 4/5 stars |
| The Village Voice | C+ |

D-D-Don't Don't Stop the Beat is the debut studio album by Danish pop duo Junior Senior. It was originally released in Denmark on 4 March 2002 through Crunchy Frog Records. An altered edition became available later in the year for the rest of continental Europe, and in 2003, the album was released in both the UK and US. It is most widely known for the song "Move Your Feet", the duo's first and most successful single.

The album received positive reviews from music critics upon release. Based on 18 reviews, Metacritic calculated an average score of 79 for D-D-Don't Don't Stop the Beat, with the summary, "This party album from the Danish band Junior Senior has garnered attention throughout Europe with its mix of garage rock, pop and disco."

Pitchfork placed the album at number 36 on their Top 50 Albums of 2003 list.

== Release history ==
The album was first released on 4 March 2002 in Denmark by the independent Crunchy Frog Records. Universal Music Group acquired the licenses to release the album in Europe outside of Denmark. In the UK, the album was released through Universal's Mercury Records on 10 March 2003. For North America, the duo asked labels to "pony up a high six-figure advance and make a strong marketing commitment." After a bidding war, Junior Senior made a deal with Atlantic Records, who planned for a 29 July release, but was pushed back to 5 August.

At one point, "Move Your Feet" was the most played song on Danish radio and made the charts in thirteen countries including Australia, France and Denmark. The follow-up EP "Rhythm Bandits" was much less successful, but briefly appeared on the charts in the United Kingdom and Australia.

D-D-Don't Don't Stop the Beat was rated among the best albums of the year by Rolling Stone, NME, Pitchfork, Entertainment Weekly and Blender. San Francisco's Sunday Chronicle named "Move Your Feet" as the single of the year, declaring it "the best song ever".

Later editions of the album feature a slightly longer remix of "Rhythm Bandits", an alternate mix of "Boy Meets Girl" and, depending on the edition, either a shorter or longer take of "Shake Me Baby" (which was titled "Just Shake It Brother" on the original Danish edition).

== Use in media ==
The third single, "Shake Your Coconuts", can be found on the Looney Tunes: Back in Action, soundtrack alongside "Move Your Feet", and as background menu music in the video game Worms 3D.

The song "White Trash" was used in an advert for Popworld, a UK television show. The dance that accompanied it achieved some cult status and was mimicked many times on YouTube.

The song "Good Girl, Bad Boy" can be heard in the film She's the Man when Viola arrives at the private school masquerading as her brother.

The song "C'mon" can be heard in the 2002 video game The Getaway when Sparky tortures a Chinese man with an electric wire. The song is also featured in the American version of the TV series Queer as Folk in the episode "Stand Up for Ourselves".

"Move Your Feet" was also featured in the 2004 comedy film White Chicks and the 2008 comedy film Forgetting Sarah Marshall.

The song "Shake Me Baby" was featured as the opening and closing theme for Chilean TV show Cabra chica gritona.

The song "Rhythm Bandits" was featured on the soundtrack for FIFA 2004.

== Track listing ==
All tracks by Jesper Mortensen except where noted.

1. "Go Junior, Go Senior" (Jeppe Laursen, Mortensen) – 2:56
2. "Rhythm Bandits" – 2:48 (The original version on the Danish album runs 2:32)
3. "Move Your Feet" – 3:01
4. "Chicks and Dicks" – 2:32
5. "Shake Your Coconuts" (Laursen, Mortensen) – 2:26
6. "Boy Meets Girl" – 3:46
7. "C'mon" – 3:11
8. "Good Girl, Bad Boy" – 2:37
9. "Shake Me Baby" – 3:12 (An alternate recording of this, "Just Shake It Brother", is on the original Danish edition)
10. "Dynamite" – 2:56
11. "White Trash" – 3:01

Standard US and special UK edition bonus tracks

12. "Coconuts" (movie edit) (Laursen, Mortensen) – 2:40
13. "Move Your Feet" (live) – 4:04

Japanese bonus tracks

12. "Cocodub" – 2:29
13. "Rhythm Bandits" (original version) – 2:32
14. "Move Your Feet" (live) – 4:02

== Personnel ==
- Patrik Bartosch – organ
- Ditte Bringøe – vocals
- Morten Bue – mastering
- Delta Lab Strings – strings
- Eggstone – engineer, mixing
- Henry Hall – harmonica
- Neja Hertzum – background vocals
- Signe Marie Jacobsen – background vocals
- Lulu Jensen – background vocals
- Helena Josefsson – vocals
- Mette Juel – background vocals
- Anna Køster – background vocals
- Allan Lauridsen – drums
- Jeppe "Senior" Laursen – vocals, handclapping
- Filip Den Etniske Hendrix Nikolîc – bass
- Jesper "Junior" Mortensen – vocals, guitar, keyboards, bass, drums, producer, engineer, editing, mixing
- Per Sunding – engineer, mixing
- Fabian Svensson – photography
- Thomas Troelsen – bass, drums, keyboards, vocals, background vocals, producer, engineer, mixing, guest appearance
- Lars I Lommen Vognstrup – vocals, background vocals
- Sara Wölck – background vocals
- Yebo – background vocals, percussion
- Jesper Reginal (aka Yebo) - mixing

== Charts ==
Chart performance for D-D-Don't Don't Stop the Beat
| Chart (2003) | Peak position |
|---|---|
| Scottish Albums (Official Charts) | 33 |
| UK Albums (Official Charts) | 29 |
| US Billboard 200 | 94 |
