= Shake Your Coconuts =

Single by Junior Senior

from the album D-D-Don't Don't Stop the Beat
- Released: 2 November 2003
- Recorded: 2002
- Genre: Power pop; dance-pop
- Length: 2:26 (album version)
- Label: Crunchy Frog
- Songwriter: Jesper Mortensen (as "Junior")
- Producers: Thomas Troelsen, Junior

Junior Senior singles chronology
"Rhythm Bandits" (2003)	"Shake Your Coconuts" (2003)	"Itch U Can't Skratch" (2004)

Music video
- "Shake Your Coconuts" on YouTube

"Shake Your Coconuts" is a song by Danish indie pop duo Junior Senior. The song was recorded in 2002 as the third single from their debut album D-D-Don't Don't Stop the Beat.

The song is played in Confessions of a Teenage Drama Queen, The Prince and Me and during the end credits of the film Looney Tunes: Back in Action, and an instrumental version of the song can be heard during some scenes from the season five Malcolm in the Middle episode "Experiment". It also features on the menus for the European release of the game Worms 3D; developers Team17 eventually released a "fix" to replace the music.

== Track listing ==
1. "Shake Your Coconuts" (album version) – 2:26
2. "Shake Your Coconuts" (movie edit) – 2:40

== Cover versions ==
The song was covered by American rock band Phish as the first set opener for the first night of their 13-night Baker's Dozen residency at Madison Square Garden on July 21, 2017.
