= The Malpractice =

Danish musical project

- Origin: Denmark
- Genres: Grunge, indie rock
- Years active: 2004-2021
- Label: Crunchy Frog
- Website: Official Site

The Malpractice was the alias of Danish songwriter Johannes Gammelby of I Am Bones and Beta Satan. His debut album Tectonics was released in 2010 on Crunchy Frog Records; gathering members from Tiger Tunes, Marybell Katastrophy and Beta Satan in the studio and on tour.

Gammelby takes grunge and aggressive rock as a point of departure, though as a songwriter in The Malpractice also adds pop hooks and noisy synthesizers in mostly violent and depressive existentialist narratives. His first album under this moniker won critical acclaim and was awarded top ten best Danish album in 2010 by GAFFA. The first single "Oh, The Irony" entered rotation on Danish national radio.

Tectonics was released in Germany through Crunchy Frog Germany in May 2011 and is due in other European countries in 2011. The remix album Tectonic Repercussions was released in 2011 and featured remixes by Jenny Wilson, Reptile Youth, Tremolo Beer Gut (as Pils Jaeger), Marybell Katastrophy, Morten Riis and more.

The Malpractice played SPOT Festival, Reeperbahn Festival and Roskilde Festival 2011.

Alongside bands as Under Byen, Powersolo and Tiger Tunes, Gammelby and his former band effort Strumm was featured in the anthology "århus.nu" about the key figures of the independent music scene in Aarhus. Beta Satan played Roskilde Festival in 2008.

== Members ==
- Johannes Gammelby – vocals and guitar
- Klaus Q. Hedegaard Nielsen – drums (Beta Satan, Tiger Tunes, Figurines (producer))
- Kenneth Nørby Andersen - guitar (Beta Satan)
- Morten Riis – synth (Beta Satan)
- Marie Højlund (live) - vocals (Marybell Katastrophy, Tiger Tunes)

== Discography ==
- Wrong Numbers Are Never Busy as I Am Bones (2005) on Morningside Records
- The Greater Good as I Am Bones (2007) on Morningside Records
- Tectonics (2010) Crunchy Frog Records
- Tectonic Repercussions (2011) (remixes by Jenny Wilson, Reptile Youth, Tremolo Beer Gut, Marybell Katastrophy, Morten Riis) Crunchy Frog Records
- Mass (2014) Crunchy Frog Records
- Slur (2018) Crunchy Frog Records
