= Robot Chicken season 1 =

Robot Chicken
- Season 1
- DVD cover
- No. of episodes: 20

Release
- Original network: Adult Swim
- Original release: February 20 – July 17, 2005

Season chronology
- Next → Season 2

The first season of the stop-motion television series Robot Chicken originally aired in the United States on Cartoon Network's late night programming block, Adult Swim. Season one officially began on February 20, 2005 on Adult Swim, with "Junk in the Trunk", and ended with "The Black Cherry" on July 17, 2005, with a total of twenty episodes.

Many of the episode names in this season ("Junk in the Trunk", "Nightmare Generator", etc.) were rejected titles previously considered for the show before settling with the current title.

The first season was released on the Season One DVD on March 28, 2006 in Region 1, September 29, 2008 in Region 2 and April 4, 2007 in Region 4.

== Overview ==
The first season of Robot Chicken establishes the series’ main premise: a dead chicken is revived by a mad scientist who reanimates him as a half cyborg, half chicken hybrid. Strapped to a chair, the robot chicken is forced to watch an endless amount of sketches that make up the body of each episode. Consequently, the first season includes many TV, movie, TV commercial, and pop culture parodies and non-sequitur blackouts, all acted out by dolls and action figures, including parodies like Rachael Leigh Cook smashing more than eggs in her latest This Is Your Brain on Drugs public service announcement, Walt Disney's severed head with its giant robotic spider-body attacking Cuba, the animals Noah left behind trying to survive the flood in their very own ark, America sending Harrison Ford and Aerosmith into space to take out a killer asteroid, the world's most diabolical supervillains getting stuck in traffic, the Teen Titans strengthening their roster by adding Beavis and Butt-Head, a teenage girl getting a fashion makeover in "Pimp My Sister", icons from Star Trek and Tiger Beat alike uniting for canned sitcom laughs in "Two Kirks, a Khan and a Pizza Place", the last surviving member of 'N Sync, Joey Fatone, having to avenge his murdered bandmates in a deadly martial arts tournament in "Enter the Fat One", the Masters of the Universe being rocked by a Paris Hilton-style sex tape, William Shatner's toupee having adventures the action star can only dream of, a man in a public restroom encountering the terror known as "Dumplestiltskin", the world's most famous monkey bursting loose on Skull Island in "Ding Dong, King Kong", Sailor Moon encountering a bone-chilling villain, Mary-Kate and Ashley Olsen uniting to fight a rampaging dragon, JAWS getting a special edition DVD, a man running away from an Oriental masseuse looking for a "happy ending", Alien vs. Predator on the battleground of love in a special episode of "First Date", a crime-fighting monkey saving monkeys from a monkey supervillain, and the laughter being canned for the sketch comedy show "You Can't Do That on Robot Chicken".

== Guest stars ==
Many celebrities have guest starred in the first season of Robot Chicken: they include Sarah Michelle Gellar, Mila Kunis, Joey Fatone, Rachael Leigh Cook, Scarlett Johansson, Conan O'Brien, Ryan Seacrest, Mark Hamill, Christian Slater, Phyllis Diller, Macaulay Culkin, Jamie Kaler, Abraham Benrubi, Donald Faison, Dax Shepard, Kurtwood Smith, Matthew Lillard, Danny Masterson, Ashton Kutcher, Debra Jo Rupp, Topher Grace, Burt Reynolds, Wilmer Valderrama, Dom DeLuise, Mike Henry, Erika Christensen, Rory Thost, Alex Borstein, Lance Bass, Pat Morita, Phil LaMarr, Ginnifer Goodwin, Ming-Na, Amy Smart, Freddie Prinze Jr., Don Knotts (before he died in 2006.), Dave Coulier, Melissa Joan Hart, Linda Cardellini, Kelly Hu, Stuart Townsend, Scott Adsit, Dean Cain, Jon Heder and Efren Ramirez.

== Episodes ==
No. overall	No. in season	Title	Directed by	Written by	Original release date	Prod. code
1	1	"Junk in the Trunk"	Matthew Senreich	Seth Green, Pat McCallum & Matthew Senreich	February 20, 2005	102
Rachael Leigh Cook smashes more than eggs in her latest This Is Your Brain on Drugs public service announcement. Optimus Prime, leader of the Autobots, falls prey to prostate cancer. The outcome is never in doubt during "World's Most One-Sided Fistfights Caught on Film." Outtakes from The Dukes of Hazzard, The X-Files, Battlestar Galactica and more come to light in "Bloopers."; Skits: "W. Loves Tacos", "Santa Crash", "Rachael Leigh Cook’s New PSA", "Teletubby Smoking", "Cut Down in His Optimus Prime", "The World's Most One-Sided Fistfights", "Oz Prison Violence", "X-Span Request Live", "I'm So Hungry", "Bloopers!" Cast: Abraham Benrubi, Rachael Leigh Cook, Donald Faison, Seth Green, Terrance Jones, Jamie Kaler, Seth MacFarlane, Dan Milano, Chad Morgan Guest stars: Macaulay Culkin, Dax Shepard
2	2	"Nutcracker Sweet"	Doug Goldstein	Seth Green, Matthew Senreich & Mike Fasolo	February 27, 2005	105
Voltron engages in an old-school dance-off in "You Got Robo-Served." The secret lives of nature's most fascinating beasts are exposed in "Secrets of the Animal Kingdom." Testicles are terrorized in "Ode to the Nut Shot." Walt Disney's severed head with its giant robotic spider-body attacks Cuba. See how much the kids are horrified in "Scary Barney"; Skits: "Seth Green and Me", "Giraffes and Trains Don't Mix", "Hey! Kool-Aid", "You Got Robo-Served", "Stalin and Me", "Protection?", "Scary Barney", "Secrets of the Animal Kingdom" ("The Mongoose: Nature's Assassin", "The Hyena: Nature's A**hole", "The Lemming: Nature's Retard"), "I Have Big Boobs", "Pattycake", "Potter in Pain", "Walt Disney Attacks!", "Evil Postal Workers", "4 Sale, Baby Vampires", "Confusing Signage", "Ode to the Nut Shot". Cast: Michael Benyaer, Sarah Michelle Gellar, Seth Green, Mike Henry, Dan Milano Guest star: Kurtwood Smith
3	3	"Gold Dust Gasoline"	Tom Root	Seth Green, Matthew Senreich & Mike Fasolo	March 6, 2005	106
The animals Noah left behind try to survive the flood in their very own ark. Enjoy instant nostalgia with "That '00s Show." Mrs. McNally's third-graders produce an animated abomination in "The Best Cowboy." The world's most famous cars, from KITT to the General Lee and even Mario karts, race against each other in "3 Fast 3 Furious."; Skits: "Ironic Heart Attack", "I Have Millions of These!", "Noah's Rejects", "Close Encounter of the Pantsed Kind", "Thirsty", "Ape Smells Finger", "Roof Jumper", "That '00s Show", "Bring Out Your Dead", "Dodgeball", "Chess Morality", "Disturbing Graph", "The Best Cowboy", "Inept Trapeze Artist", "3 Fast 3 Furious", "Outtakes" Cast: Abraham Benrubi, Seth Green, Mila Kunis, Dan Milano Guest stars: Dom DeLuise, Topher Grace, Ashton Kutcher, Matthew Lillard, Danny Masterson, Burt Reynolds, Debra Jo Rupp, Kurtwood Smith, Wilmer Valderrama
4	4	"Plastic Buffet"	Tom Root	Seth Green, Matthew Senreich & Mike Fasolo	March 13, 2005	108
America sends Harrison Ford and Aerosmith into space to take out a killer asteroid in Meteorgeddon. Household animals take to the slopes for "Winter Pet Games." Chucky from the Child's Play series takes on the cutesy Lettuce Head Kids in the opening to season 8 of Buffy the Vampire Slayer. The Muppet Show's band is spotlighted in "Behind the Music: Electric Mayhem."; Skits: "Wealthy & Successful", "You're Going Down, Devil", "Seacrest, Out!", "Unfortunate Burglar", "Señor Clean", "The Usual Wedgie", "Meteorgeddon", "Clown Car Crash", "Buffy: Season 8", "Give Me the Boobies!", "The Fourth Annual Winter Pet Games", "Centaur Tailor", "Inept Magician", "Behind the Music: Electric Mayhem" Cast: Sarah Michelle Gellar, Seth Green, Mike Henry, Terrence Jones, Dan Milano, Victor Yerrid (uncredited), Noah Segan (uncredited) Guest stars: Mark Hamill, Ryan Seacrest
5	5	"Toyz in the Hood"	Matthew Senreich	Seth Green, Mike Fasolo, Pat McCallum & Matthew Senreich	March 20, 2005	110
The tooth fairy stumbles into domestic violence and murder in "Tooth and Consequences." The world's most diabolical supervillains get stuck in traffic. More of television's greatest screw-ups, from CSI to Mister Rogers' Neighborhood and Pro-sports, are highlighted in "Bloopers."; Skits: "Monkey Rodeo", "Fatty Sundae", "Tooth and Consequences" (has 2 alternate endings), "Guy Jumping Over Car", "Catch That Nuts!", "The Last Straw", "Immature Pilots", "Clown in Jail", "Plane Crash (Immature Pilots - part 2)", "Supervillains in Traffic", "Sports Bar Birthday Party", "Bloopers! Two" Cast: Donald Faison, Seth Green, Jamie Kaler, Breckin Meyer, Dan Milano, Chad Morgan Guest stars: Erika Christensen, Scarlett Johansson Title reference: Parodies the title of the 1991 film Boyz n the Hood.
6	6	"Vegetable Fun Fest"	Doug Goldstein	Seth Green, Mike Fasolo & Matthew Senreich	March 27, 2005	111
The secrets of The Crying Game, Sleepaway Camp, Star Wars and The Village are exposed in "Welcome to the Spoilers." The Teen Titans strengthen their roster by adding Beavis and Butt-head. Benny Hill's funeral is a farce. The Great Pumpkin of Peanuts fame finally shows. Too bad he becomes murderous, and goes on a killing spree. Skits: "Farting the National Anthem", "Snail Rides a Turtle", "It's Your Baby", "Chainsaw Surgeon", "Spoilers", "That Was Close", "Corndog Audience", "Beavis and Butt-head Join the Teen Titans", "Hunting Dog Heart Attack", "Sore Loser", "Nun & Bicycle", "Benny Hill Funeral", "Served!", "The Time of the Great Pumpkin" Cast: Abraham Benrubi, Seth Green, Breckin Meyer, Dan Milano, Chad Morgan, Rory Thost Guest stars: Mark Hamill, Katelin Petersen Note: Because of licensing issues involving the use of Beavis and Butt-head (without permission from MTV), "Teen Titans Meet Beavis and Butt-head" is edited from the season one DVD version and the Hulu version of his episode. HBO Max's version reinstates it and the season two DVD set includes the missing sketch.
7	7	"A Piece of the Action"	Seth Green	Seth Green, Matthew Senreich & Mike Fasolo	April 3, 2005	109
A teenage girl gets a fashion makeover in "Pimp My Sister." The Surreal Life gang gets sent on a mission to destroy an enchanted ring. Debbie Does Dallas gets re-told with the world's cheapest puppets in "Exhausted Budget Theater." Geeks and nerds collide when a science fiction convention erupts into war. Skits: "All Suited Up", "Will It Hurt?", "Italian Stereotypes", "Pimp My Sister", "Hairy Lollipop", "We'll Be Dead Soon", "Corporal Punishment", "The Surreal Life (Lord of the Rings, Star Wars)", "Jesus Christ's Practical Joke", "Ape vs. Kangaroo", "Easter Bunny Rampage", "Exhausted Budget Theater Presents: Debbie Does Dallas", "Alien v/s Predator (chess battle)", "Falling on the Moon", "Good Catch", "Sci-Fi Convention War" Cast: Michael Benyaer, Donald Faison, Seth Green, Jamie Kaler, Breckin Meyer, Dan Malino, Chad Morgan, Adam Talbott Guest stars: Erika Christensen, Scarlett Johansson
8	8	"The Deep End"	Seth Green	Seth Green, Pat McCallum & Matthew Senreich	April 10, 2005	101
Seven of the world's greatest heroes stop being polite and start getting real in "The Real World: Metropolis." Icons from Star Trek and Tiger Beat alike unite for canned sitcom laughs in "Two Kirks, a Khan and a Pizza Place." Jesus Christ hunts down his greatest nemesis, Tarantino-style in "Kill Bunny." The hottest game show from Japan is here: "Who Poop Last?!" The legends of rock 'n' roll return from beyond the grave to haunt the "Zombie Idol" reality show. Skits: "Too Curious George", "Rhino on a Car", "The Real World: Metropolis", "Cats Are Jerks", "For America!", "Kill Bunny", "Sex Doll Abuser", "Two Kirks, a Khan and a Pizza Place", "Who Poop Last?!", "Cow Tipping", "Zombie Idol" Cast: Abraham Benrubi, Michael Benyaer, Alex Borstein, Seth Green, Seth MacFarlane, Breckin Meyer, Dan Milano, Chad Morgan, Adam Talbott Guest star: Ryan Seacrest
9	9	"S&M Present"	Tom Root	Seth Green, Mike Fasolo, Pat McCallum & Matthew Senreich	April 17, 2005	112
The last surviving member of 'N Sync, Joey Fatone, must avenge his murdered bandmates in a deadly martial arts tournament in "Enter the Fat One". Check out a little scrambled porn on your 1980s-era cable box. M. Night Shyamalan has endless fake-outs in store for viewers in "The Twist."; Skits: "Time for Dinner", "Inept Figure Skater", "Enter the Fat One", "Evil Clown", "Scrambled Porn", "Cow Cannibals", "Living Piñata", "Spelling Bee at the Apollo", "Girls Room Invader", "What a Twist!", "Donut Ring Toss", "Shop Teacher's Surprise", "Motorcycle Revenge" Cast: Seth Green, Breckin Meyer, Chad Morgan, Adam Talbott Guest stars: Lance Bass, Joey Fatone, Mark Hamill, Pat Morita Title reference: The letters "S" and "M" represent the first initials of Seth Green and Matthew Senreich. Though it could be mistaken for sadomasochism.
10	10	"Badunkadunk!"	Seth Green	Seth Green, Mike Fasolo & Matthew Senreich	April 24, 2005	113
The roller-coaster celebrity life of the Hulk is profiled in "Hollywood Spotlight." The Masters of the Universe are rocked by a Paris Hilton-style sex tape. Michael Jackson returns from space to confront his n'er-do-well alter ego in "Where's Michael?"; Skits: "Skydiving Clown", "Bad Aim", "Fagabeefe", "Hollywood Spotlight", "Squirrel Gone Nuts", "Sabrina the Teenage Bitch", "Pinocchio's Firewood", "Chappaqua Follies", "Wheelchair Ride", "Leon!", "Domestic Bird Squabble", "How Old Are You?", "Eternia News Network", "Port-a-Potty Mistake", "Where's Michael?" Cast: Leah Cevoli, Seth Green, Jamie Kaler, Mila Kunis, Phil LaMarr, Seth MacFarlane, Chad Morgan, Adam Talbott Guest stars: Macaulay Culkin, Pat O'Brien
11	11	"Toy Meets Girl"	Matthew Senreich	Seth Green, Mike Fasolo, Pat McCallum & Matthew Senreich	May 1, 2005	114
William Shatner's toupee has adventures the action star can only dream of. Heaven is not all it is cracked up to be in "Can We Handle the Truth?" Hilary Duff's new film combines history and teen drama in an updated "The Diary of Anne Frank." The fates of the greatest action figure toy lines from decades past are exposed in "Where Are They Now?" with host Michael Moore. Skits: "No Tee Pee", "Watching You", "Shatner's Toupee", "Shazam!", "Sam Leaps Into Paris", Billy's Questions", "Can We Handle the Truth?", "Newspaper in the Kisser", "Big Trouble", "Love You TiVo", "It's Not a Tumor", "The Diary of Anne Frank", "Baby in the Bulldozer", "West Nile Virus Rules", "Where Are They Now?" Cast: Alex Borstein, Seth Green, Jordan Ladd, Seth MacFarlane, Breckin Meyer, Chad Morgan, Adam Talbott, Fred Tatasciore, Victor Yerrid Guest stars: Ashton Kutcher, Scarlett Johansson (uncredited) Note: This was actually the pilot episode. Title reference: Play on words of Boy Meets Girl.
12	12	"Midnight Snack"	Seth Green	Seth Green, Mike Fasolo & Matthew Senreich	May 15, 2005	115
"The World's Most One-Sided Fistfights" get wild at Mardi Gras. Benjamin Franklin grapples with historical figures like the Wright brothers and Mahatma Gandhi in "Educational Wrestling Federation." Oprah Winfrey fulfills all her viewers' fondest wishes...almost. A man in a public restroom encounters the terror known as "Dumplestiltskin." "12 Angry Little People" deliberate a crime most heinous. Skits: "Randy the Oblivious Pizza Delivery Guy", "Battling Skeletons", "Mr. Peanut", "The World's Most One-Sided Fistfights Two", "Battling Politicians", "Educational Wrestling Federation", "What Color Are the Boobies?", "Fig Leafs", "Oprah Winfrey", "Joking Pirates", "Dumplestiltskin", "Pommel Horse Nightmares", "Births Gone Bad", "12 Angry Little People" Cast: Seth Green, Dan Milano, Chad Morgan, Tom Root (uncredited), Matthew Senreich (uncredited), Pamela Tyson, Victor Yerrid Guest star: Conan O'Brien
13	13	"Atta Toy"	Tom Root	Seth Green, Mike Fasolo & Matthew Senreich	May 22, 2005	116
A teenage girl gets crazy about everyone around her. The world's most famous monkey bursts loose on Skull Island in "Ding Dong, King Kong." Scandalous Hollywood news and gossip get the Pat O'Brien treatment. A father pigeon teaches his son to poop in a snorkel to make things wild. The Smurfs are terrorized by a murderer who kills based on the seven deadly sins in "Murder in Smurf Town X."; Skits: "Flip the Switch!", "Humping Robot", "Motorcycle Cop's Dream", "Total Request Live", "More Butter", "Ding Dong, King Kong", "Access Hollywood", "A Little Help?", "Big Balls", "I'm So Fat", "Rock, Paper, Scissors", "Hicks and Pigs", "Bird Learns", "Murder in Smurf Town X" Cast: Leah Cevoli, Danny Goldman, Ginnifer Goodwin, Seth Green, Breckin Meyer, Dan Milano, Victor Yerrid Guest stars: Pat O'Brien, Stuart Townsend Title reference: Play-on words of the phrase "'Atta Boy!"
14	14	"Joint Point"	Doug Goldstein	Seth Green, Mike Fasolo & Matthew Senreich	June 5, 2005	117
Sailor Moon encounters a bone-chilling villain. A nerd wins a date with Scarlett Johansson. "Welcome to the Terror Drome" showcases inner-office machinations at the headquarters of G.I. Joe's nemesis Cobra. "America's Most Tragic Home Videos" will make you laugh and cry. Skits: "Uncomfortable Robot", "A Lot of Pee", "Sailor Moon Confronted (part 1)", "Ridged for Her Pleasure", "A Date with Scarlett", "Queen Beryl is Mad (Sailor Moon - part 2)", "Welcome to the Terror Drome", "Date Rape", "Anime Sure is Weird (Sailor Moon - part 3)", "Ray 2: Ray's Day Out - The Movie", "Mortal Kombat", "What Goes Around", "Rockem Sockem Robots", "Top Ten Things Eddie Buttskin Should Never Say", "Tasty Sample", "Monster Bullying", "America's Most Tragic Home Videos" Cast: Leah Cevoli, Sarah Michelle Gellar, Doug Goldstein (uncredited), Seth Green, Jamie Kaler, Dan Milano, Chad Morgan Guest stars: Mark Hamill, Scarlett Johansson, Danny Masterson
15	15	"Kiddie Pool"	Doug Goldstein	Seth Green, Matthew Senreich & Mike Fasolo	June 12, 2005	107
Michael Knight's talking car parties hard in "KITT's Day Out." A brawl rocks the nursing home in "Grandma Fu." Mary-Kate and Ashley Olsen unite to fight a rampaging dragon. George Jetson's murder takes center stage in "Unsolved Case Files: I, Rosie."; Skits: "Hip Hip, Horray!", "See-Saw", "Mission to Mars: Day 293", "KITT's Day Out", "Mission to Mars: Day 312", "My Toe", "Going to the Ball?", "Grandma Fu", "Polar Bear Puke", "Mission to Mars: Day 331", "The Incredible Adventures of the Olsen Twins", "Disfigured", "God Creates the Platypus", "There's a Monster in My Closet", "He's Dead", "Mission to Mars: Day 332", "Unsolved Case Files: I, Rosie", "Next Time on Unsolved Case Files: Jem" Cast: Donald Faison, Seth Green, Mike Henry, Breckin Meyer, Chad Morgan Guest star: Ming-Na Wen
16	16	"Nightmare Generator"	Matthew Senreich	Seth Green, Mike Fasolo, Pat McCallum & Matthew Senreich	June 19, 2005	103
Jaws gets a special edition DVD. A drug operation at the North Pole is revealed in "Unsolved Case Files: Claus & Effect." The A-Team solves its problems with maximum firepower and minimal intelligence. Skits: "Rappers in Heaven", "Betsy Creates the Flag", "Teddy Bear Love", "Jared Breaks His Diet", "Missing Since Last Tuesday", "How Many Licks?", "Bride of Frankenstein Dumps Her Beau", "Unsolved Case Files: Claus & Effect", "Next Time on Unsolved Case Files: The Taco Bell Chihuahua's Castration", "Come and Get Some!", "Ent Murder", "Constipated Clown", "Brandon the Ninja", "Jaws: Special Edition", "Brand New Board Game - Euthanasia", "Gandhi the Night Club Pianist", "The A-Team" Cast: Abraham Benrubi, Alex Borstein, Leah Cevoli, Seth Green, Jordan Ladd, Seth MacFarlane, Dan Milano, Chad Morgan, Amy Smart, Fred Tatasciore, Victor Yerrid Guest stars: Ashton Kutcher, Dax Shepard
17	17	"Operation: Rich in Spirit"	Seth Green	Seth Green, Mike Fasolo & Matthew Senreich	June 26, 2005	118
A new video game is taking video games by storm, "Codename: The Abortionator." A video dating experience a la The Ring scares a potential suitor. A man runs away from an Oriental masseuse looking for a "happy ending". Keanu Reeves, Christopher Walken, and William Shatner want you to buy his special brand of sausage. The Scooby-Doo gang encounters Jason Voorhees at Camp Crystal Lake. Skits: "Dragon in the Tub", "Fatal Sneeze", "Codename: The Abortionator", "Berry Rude", "Dorky Dancer", "I Wonder If She Puts Out?", "The Butterfly Effect", "Happy Birthday Grandma!", "Happy Ending Chase", "Women's Soccer", "Restroom Surprise", "Keanu Sausage", "Another Restroom Surprise", "Inept Secret Agent", "Crazy Monkeys on Land Mine Island", "Flatley & Vader", "A Scooby Friday" Cast: Sarah Michelle Gellar, Seth Green, Amy Smart, Fred Tatasciore Guest stars: Linda Cardellini, Dave Coulier, Phyllis Diller, Melissa Joan Hart, Don Knotts, Matthew Lillard, Freddie Prinze, Jr.
18A	18A	"The Sack"	Matthew Senreich	Seth Green, Mike Fasolo, Pat McCallum & Matthew Senreich	July 3, 2005	104A
It's Alien vs. Predator on the battleground of love in a special episode of "First Date". Frogger creates a huge car wreck in this episode. See what the future holds in the Carousel of Tomorrow. Popeye experiences a world without his hamburger-leeching friend in "It's a Wimpy-Filled Life". The modern video game Halo invades the old-school classic Donkey Kong. The cereal spokesbunny Sashi Kobayashi (Stuffed Rabbit) finds himself a new way to make a buck. An alternate re-edit of this episode was first aired on the night of Friday, April and May, 2008 as "Adultizzle Swizzle". This new version featured a few additions and a different finale sketch. Skits: "Street Vendor Nightmare", "First Date", "Firecracker", "Frogger Car Wreck", "Tetsuo!", "Carousel of Tomorrow", "Alarm Clock Reversal", "Mayor McCheese Press Conference", "Ross Hashanah in 'Never Say Goy!'", "It's a Wimpy-Filled Life", "Halo Kong", "Stix Are Intended for Children" Cast: Ginnifer Goodwin, Seth Green, Mila Kunis, Phil LaMarr, Breckin Meyer, Tania Gunadi, Victor Yerrid Guest stars: Scott Adsit, Dave Coulier, Kelly Hu, Stuart Townsend
18B	18B	"Adultizzle Swizzle"	Matthew Senreich	Seth Green, Matthew Senreich, Mike Fasolo & Pat McCallum	April 11, 2008; May 16, 2008	104B
It's Alien vs. Predator on the battleground of love in a special episode of "First Date." Frogger creates a huge car wreck in this episode. See what the future holds in the Carousel of Tomorrow. Popeye experiences a world without his hamburger-leeching friend in "It's a Wimpy-Filled Life." The modern video game Halo invades the old-school classic Donkey Kong. What we never knew happened to Ponda Baba on that fateful day in the cantina. Two Season 1 deleted scenes ("Army Firecracker" and "Mrs. McNally's 3rd Graders Present: Tim Burton's The Corpse Bride") and one scene from the first Star Wars special ("Ponda Baba's Bad Day") replace the sketch "Stix are Intended for Children" in this alternate version of the episode "The Sack". Skits: "Street Vendor Nightmare", "First Date", "Firecracker", "Frogger Car Wreck", "Tetsuo!", "Carousel of Tomorrow", "Alarm Clock Reversal", "Mayor McCheese Press Conference", "Never Say Goy!", "It's a Wimpy-Filled Life", "Halo Kong", "Mrs. McNally's 3rd Graders Present: Tim Burton's The Corpse Bride", "Ponda Baba's Bad Day" Cast: Bob Bergen, Donald Faison, Seth Green, Mila Kunis, Phil LaMarr, George Lowe, Seth MacFarlane, Breckin Meyer, Dan Milano Guest stars: Scott Adsit, Dave Coulier, Alan Cumming, Kelly Hu, Shane McRae, Conan O'Brien Title reference: Play-on words of the Adult Swim network that airs the show.
19	19	"That Hurts Me!"	Matthew Senreich	Seth Green, Mike Fasolo & Matthew Senreich	July 10, 2005	119
Dean Devlin and Roland Emmerich re-make Godzilla...again. A crime-fighting monkey saves monkeys from a monkey supervillain. An average fellow named Doug wakes up in the world of the Huggytime Bears. Freddy Krueger, Jason Voorhees, Leatherface, Pinhead, Ghostface and Michael Myers sign on for the reality show "Big Brother". Skits: "That Better Not Be Poo", "Hell Freezes Over", "Simon Says Go Play in Traffic", "Godzilla Remade Again", "Fear Itself", "Cliff Pogo", "Where Do They Get the Energy?", "Bat-Monkey", "Crazy Davey", "Huggytime Bears", "I Got You, Timmy!", "Big Horror Movie Brother" Cast: Seth Green, Roger L. Jackson, Amy Smart Guest stars: Macaulay Culkin, Scott Adsit, Dave Coulier, Kelly Hu
20	20	"The Black Cherry"	Doug Goldstein	Seth Green, Mike Fasolo & Matthew Senreich	July 17, 2005	120
Napoleon Bonamite pops up as a famous figure from history. Fizzing candy has terrible repercussions for young Mikey. Pennywise the Clown explains why everything floats in the sewers. A weakling turns into the "King of the Beach" with some illegal help. The laughter is canned for the sketch comedy show "You Can't Do That on Robot Chicken."; Skits: "Newspaper Boy", "Pop Rocks and Soda", "Mothers Back Breaking", "Free Pizza", "A Visionary Cult", "A Love That Can Never Be", "Crazy Mutant Clown", "Gay Pirates", "A Shot of Puberty", "Don't Take Drugs PSA", "The Last Food Fight", "Lewis & Clark", "Wet Off the Oil", "High Caliber Fun", "2% Gone Bad", "Snoop Dogg Plane", "You Can't Do That on Robot Chicken" Cast: Keith Crofford (uncredited), Sarah Michelle Gellar, Seth Green, Jamie Kaler, Mila Kunis, Breckin Meyer, Chad Morgan Guest stars: Dean Cain, Macaulay Culkin, Jon Heder, Efren Ramirez

== DVD release ==
Title	Release date			Episodes
Title	Region 1	Region 2	Region 4	Episodes
"Season One: Uncensored"	March 28, 2006	September 29, 2008	April 4, 2007	1–20
This two disc boxset includes all 20 episodes from Season 1 in production order. While it contains many sketches that were edited from the TV airings, several of the original Sony Screenblast webtoons, and the words "Jesus" and "Christ" as an oath unbleeped (though "fuck" and "shit" are still censored out), the episodes are not all uncut. One particular segment in the episode "Vegetable Fun Fest" that featured the Teen Titans meeting Beavis and Butt-Head was omitted from the DVD because of legal problems (the version shown on Hulu Plus has the sketch). The Voltron/You Got Served sketch in the episode "Nutcracker Sweet" shown on the DVD has a replacement song because of legal issues over the song that was used on TV (the Hulu Plus version has the original song). At a performance of Family Guy Live in Chicago, during the Q&A session that ends each performance, Seth Green was asked how they came up with the name Robot Chicken. He explained that the title of each episode was a name Adult Swim rejected for the name of the show. A Region 2 version of the set was released in the UK on September 29, 2008.
