= Amorine Queen =

Studio album by 18th Dye
- Released: May 6, 2008
- Recorded: 2008
- Genre: Noise rock
- Label: Crunchy Frog Records

18th Dye chronology
Tribute to a Bus (1995)	Amorine Queen (2008)

Professional ratings
Review scores
Source	Rating
Allmusic	3.5/5 stars

Amorine Queen is the third and final album by the German/Danish noise rock band 18th Dye, released on May 6, 2008 on Crunchy Frog Records.

The band had broken up in 1995 following their 2nd album, "Tribute to a Bus", but reformed in 2005, playing tours around Europe, during which the wrote the tracks for the album. They disbanded again 2009.

According to Kenneth Herzog of Allmusic, the album contains influences ranging from Sonic Youth, to late-period The Clash to late-70s Fleetwood Mac, and described the sound as "both violent and sweet, delicate and abrasive – thanks in large part to a seductive female-vocal presence".

== Track listing ==
All songs by 18th Dye.

1. "Island vs. Island" – 4:26
2. "Soft the Hard Way" – 2:41
3. "Chinese Spoon" – 3:03
4. "Go 'N' Go" – 2:30
5. "Big Sky" – 2:21
6. "Amorines" – 4:17
7. "On Waking Up" – 1:25
8. "Is" – 3:07
9. "Backdoor" – 3:40
10. "Text Is My Killer" – 2:54
11. "Song for Helen" – 3:32
12. "Air" – 4:46

== Personnel ==
- Sebastian Büttrich – vocals / guitar
- Heike Rädeker – bass / vocals
- Piet Bendtsen – drums
