= Boy Meets Girl (EP) =

EP by Junior Senior
- Released: 10 June 2003
- Length: 16:43
- Label: Crunchy Frog
- Producer: Junior Senior

Junior Senior chronology
D-D-Don't Don't Stop the Beat (2002)	Boy Meets Girl (2003)	Hey Hey My My Yo Yo (2005)

Boy Meets Girl is an EP by Danish pop duo Junior Senior. It was released on 10 June 2003 by Crunchy Frog Records.

== Track listing ==
1. "Boy Meets Girl"
2. "Rhythm Bandits"
3. "Shake Me Baby"
4. "Cocodub"
5. "Move Your Feet"

The CD version of the EP includes video multimedia tracks for:

- "Boy Meets Girl"
- "Move Your Feet"
- "Dynamite"
- "Chicks and Dicks"
- "Good Girl, Bad Boy"
- "The Delta Lab Diary"
