= Tribute to a Bus =

Tribute To A Bus

Studio album by 18th Dye
- Released: March 28, 1995
- Recorded: 1994
- Genre: Noise rock
- Length: 42.25
- Label: Matador / Cloudland Records

18th Dye chronology
Done (1992)	Tribute To A Bus (1995)	Amorine Queen (2008)

Professional ratings
Review scores
Source	Rating
AllMusic	4/5 stars

Tribute To A Bus is the second album by the German/Danish noise rock band 18th Dye, released on March 28, 1995, on Matador Records. The album track "Play W/You" was released on April 11, 1995, as the leading single.

It was recorded and engineered by Steve Albini, and has been compared as similar in sound to his work with Nirvana and The Wedding Present. Although critically acclaimed, neither the album nor the single were commercially successful, and 18th Dye disbanded the following year.

== Overview and sound ==
The band's earlier releases, Done and the six-song Crayon EP had been produced by Iain Burgess, and the band themselves, respectively. In comparison, Tribute To A Bus has a nosier, more melodic and distinctive sound, which may be attributed to Albini's input and production values. Critic Jason Ferguson described it as a "far more complicated album", composed of "straightforward pop songs countered by structurally deprived numbers like the vast Go! Song and the sprawling, Bad Moon Rising-esque No Time/11 (Spectators)."

The album's stark sound, minimalist approach and complex song structures led to comparisons with the work of modern classical composers such as Philip Glass and Glenn Branca, as well as rock bands such as Sonic Youth era "Sister" and My Bloody Valentine circa "Isn't Anything". The album combines frequent bursts of feedback and dissonance, during which the drums often drop out, punctuated by simpler melodies and pop hooks.

== Reception ==
Critics praised Tribute to a Bus's blending of noise and melody. According to rock critic Steve McGuirl, the songs are "built from unlikely fragments based on metronomic ching-ching-ching downstroke guitar lines and fragile, icy arpeggios that usually erupt into blasts of dissonance and feedback." McGuirl went on to describe the album as "full of stark, beautiful moments and subtle hooks that keep arty self-indulgence at bay."

"Poolhouse Blue"
"Poolhouse Blue" features vocals from bassist Heike Rädeker

Heather Phares of The Michigan Daily wrote in 1995 that the album's "stripped-down, fuzzed-out soundscapes are both dreamy and energetic...[and that] the Dye's approach to rock remains both fresh and poppy." Writing for The Stanford Daily the same year, Arnold Pan praised the album's "head-rush" and "fierce wall o' noise" sound, and particularly Büttrich's guitar work, which he described as "letting his instrument drone on — loud or quiet — then slipping the overdrive into new and captivating directions."

== Track listing ==
All songs were written by 18th Dye. Bassist Heike Rädeker provides backing vocals on a number of tracks and lead on "Poolhouse Blue".

The cover art features a photograph of the band members against a deep green background, with the band name in large rounded lowercase type. The song titles are listed, also in lowercase, along the left-hand side of the front cover. The inner sleeves contain the song lyrics.

1. "Glass House Failure" – 4:02
2. "Sole Arch " – 3:52
3. "Only Burn" – 2:56
4. "Play W/You" – 3:59
5. "Label" – 3:31
6. "No Time/11 (Spectators)" – 3:3
7. "Poolhouse Blue" – 6:5
8. "Go! song" – 2:59
9. "D." – 3:17
10. "Galeer" – 2:31
11. "Mitsuo Downer" – 3:21
12. "Easy (And How We Got There 1st)" – 4:52

== Personnel ==
- Sebastian Büttrich – vocals / guitar
- Heike Rädeker – bass / vocals
- Piet Bendtsen – drums
