= Done (18th Dye album) =

Studio album by 18th Dye
- Released: 5 May 1994
- Recorded: Jun 1992
- Genre: Noise rock
- Label: Matador Records
- Producer: Iain Burgess

18th Dye chronology
Done (1994)	Tribute To A Bus (1995)

Professional ratings
Review scores
Source	Rating
Allmusic	4/5 stars

Done is the debut album by the German/Danish noise rock band 18th Dye, originally released in 1994.

A1 Merger 3:20 A2 Whole Wide World 3:14 A3 9 Out Of 10 2:32 A4 Dive 5:30 A5 Either 1:57 A6 Club Madame 2:41 B1 To A Sunny Day 4:10 B2 Can You Wink? 2:54 B3 Stupidity 2:59 B4 Club 0:47 B5 Tumbling Down 2:32B6 Girls Boots 3:50 B7 Tar 2:17

== Personnel ==
- Sebastian Büttrich – vocals / Guitar
- Heike Rädeker – vocals / Bass guitar
- Piet Bendtsen – drums
