= The Naked =

Danish indie rock band

- Origin: Copenhagen, Denmark
- Genre: Rock
- Years active: 1989–1999
- Labels: AGM Music, Crunchy Frog, Purderous Magina

The Naked was a Danish indie-rock band that existed from the end of the 1980s and disbanded in 1999. The band started out under the name Naked Lunch, later shortening the name to Naked, and finally to The Naked.

The band was formed by Kasper Andersen (vocal, guitar) and Jacob Als Thomsen (guitar), who met in high school in the mid-eighties. Andersen started out as drummer, but switched to guitar after Thomsen left temporarily to study abroad. At this time guitarist Anders Reuss and bass player Søren Rohde had joined. The band rehearsed with a drum machine until Emil Landgreen joined the band as a drummer in the summer of 1990, coinciding with the return of Thomsen. This line-up started playing regularly on the Copenhagen underground scene in late 1990. At the time of the band's first album, Søren Rohde had left to be replaced by Andreas Koch on bass. During the recording Landgreen left to join Speaker Bite Me and was replaced by Rene Thorny. Astrid Bruun Johansen joined on viola after the second album.

The Naked introduced the experimental, noisy and distortion-laden sound of then contemporary American and British indie-rock to the Copenhagen music scene, inspired by the post-punk sounds of Sonic Youth, Swans, My Bloody Valentine, and Loop. The band later turned towards a more introverted style which still maintained these dissonant elements but tempered them with almost folk-like arrangements.

The second album, Pass Out, was produced by Chris Brokaw of Come and Codeine. The Naked supported Come on the band's tour of northern Europe in 1998. The grand old man of Danish rock, Steen Jørgensen of Sort Sol, also appeared as lead vocalist on a track of the band's 1997 EP, Some Kind Of Beautiful. In Copenhagen, the band opened for Mercury Rev and Smog, amongst others. From 1996 to 1999, Andersen took up the drums again in the band Sfu·ma·to. Anders Reuss played bass in Death To the from 1990 to 1993 and Port Friendly in 1995 and 1996.

After the break-up and Andersen's sex reassignment surgery, many band members continued in Ensemble Orlando.

== Discography ==
- All The Good Things Are Gone (CD, 1994, AGM Music)
- Pass Out (CD, 1996, Crunchy Frog)
- Some Kind Of Beautiful (10" EP, 1997, Crunchy Frog)
- How Could One Ever Think Anything's Permanent (CD, 1999, Purderous Magina Records)

=== Compilations ===
- Children Of The Night - a Roky Erickson tribute (LP, 1997)
- A Decade Of Crunchy Frog Music (2xCD, 2004, Crunchy Frog)
