= First Floor Power =

Swedish rock band

- Origin: Sweden
- Genres: Indie pop Experimental
- Years active: 1997-Present
- Labels: Silence Records; Crunchy Frog Records
- Members: Karl-Jonas Winqvist; Sara Wilson; Per Lager
- Past members: Jenny Wilson

First Floor Power is an indie rock band from Sweden. FFP recorded and released their debut EP We Are the People in 2000 on the Swedish label Silence Records. In 2001 their debut album There is Hope was released. Swedish National TV produced a one-hour documentary about the band which focused on the struggle and attempts of the band in its early career. Their sound has been described as a combination of afrobeat and 70s pop music. The band was listed in the "ten albums of the year" in Time Out Magazine.

Jenny Wilson left the band to pursue a solo career after the band's second album.

== Discography ==
=== Albums ===
- There Is Hope CD (2001)
- Nerves CD (2003)
- Don't Back Down CD (2008)

=== Singles/EPs ===
- We Are the People CDM (2000)
- Time Time (EP) CDM (2000)
- Love Will Come Knocking CDS (2001)
- The Covers 7" (2002)
- Happy Endings CDM (2003)
- The Jacket 12" (2008)

== Members ==
Current

- Karl-Jonas Winqvist
- Sarah Wilson
- Per Lager

Past

- Jenny Wilson
