= Boy Meets Boy =

Boy Meets Boy may refer to:

- Boy Meets Boy (TV series), a 2003 American reality television series
- Boy Meets Boy (2008 film), a South Korean short film
- Boy Meets Boy (2021 film), a German English-language film
- Boy Meets Boy (musical), a 1975 Off-Broadway musical comedy by Bill Solly and Donald Ward
- Boy Meets Boy (novel), a 2003 novel by David Levithan

== See also ==
- "When Boy Meets Boy", a 2013 song by Matt Fishel
- Boy Meets Girl (disambiguation)
