= I Scream Ice Cream =

I Scream Ice Cream (ISIC)
- Origin: Denmark
- Genres: Dance
- Labels: Tigerspring Records; Kitsuné Musique
- Members: Jesper Mortensen

I Scream Ice Cream is the side project of Jesper Mortensen, best known as a member of the duo Junior Senior. The French record label Kitsuné Musique released a 12 inch with the songs "Trust Tissue" and "Closing Time Closing In" on June 2, 2008. The tracks on the Kitsune release are shorter edits of the original longer tracks that are available on the full-length album Me Too available on Tigerspring records. The album consists of only three tracks, each 25, 35, and 45 minutes in length – and, respectively, 105, 130, and 125 beats per minute.
