= Boy Meets Girl =

Boy Meets Girl may refer to:

== Film, television and theatre ==
- Boy Meets Girl (play), a 1935 Broadway play by Bella and Samuel Spewack, basis for the 1938 film
- Boy Meets Girl (1938 film), an American film starring James Cagney
- Boy Meets Girl (1982 film), an Israeli film directed by Michal Bat-Adam
- Boy Meets Girl (1984 film), a French film directed by Leos Carax
- Boy Meets Girl (1998 film), a Canadian-American romantic comedy directed by Jerry Ciccoritti, starring Sean Astin
- Boy Meets Girl (2009 TV series), a 2009 UK 4-part TV miniseries (fantasy comedy-drama) starring Rachael Stirling and Martin Freeman
- Boy Meets Girl (2014 film), an American film about a transgender woman, written and directed by Eric Schaeffer
- Boy Meets Girl (2015 TV series), a UK TV series starring Rebecca Root, Harry Hepple and Denise Welch, and featuring a transgender main character played by a transgender actress.

== Literature ==
- Boy Meets Girl: Say Hello to Courtship, a 2000 book by Joshua Harris
- Boy Meets Girl (novel), a 2004 novel by Meg Cabot

== Music ==
- Boy Meets Girl (band), an American pop duo
- Boy Meets Girl (Boy Meets Girl album), 1985
- Boy Meets Girl (Sammy Davis Jr. and Carmen McRae album), 1957
- Boy Meets Girl, an album by Stroke 9, 1993
- Boy Meets Girl (EP), by Junior Senior, or the title song, 2003
- "Boy Meets Girl" (song), by TRF, 1994
- "Boy Meets Girl", a song by Evan Taubenfeld from Welcome to the Blacklist Club, 2010
- "Boy Meets Girl", a song by NCT Wish, 2026
- "Favourite Shirts (Boy Meets Girl)", a song by Haircut 100, 1981

== See also ==
- Boy Meets Girls, a 1950s UK popular music TV show
- "Boys Meet Girls", a 2012 episode of the Indian TV series Best of Luck Nikki, the Indian adaptation of Good Luck Charlie
- Boy Meets Boy (disambiguation)
- Girl Meets Boy, a 2007 novel
