= Hardships! =

Album by Jenny Wilson

Studio album by Jenny Wilson
- Released: 25 February 2009
- Genre: Art rock
- Length: 53:43
- Label: Gold Medal
- Producer: Jenny Wilson

Jenny Wilson chronology
Love and Youth (2005)	Hardships! (2009)	Blazing (2011)

Professional ratings
Review scores
Source	Rating
Slant Magazine	4.5/5 stars
Spin	7/10 stars
The Line of Best Fit	Favorable
Dagens Nyheter	4/5 stars

Hardships! is an album by Jenny Wilson, released in 2009.

== Track listing ==
1. "The Path" – 5:19
2. "Like a Fading Rainbow" – 3:47
3. "Clattering Hooves" – 4:43
4. "The Wooden Chair" – 3:15
5. "Porcelain Castle" – 3:36
6. "Anchor Made of Gold" – 4:48
7. "Bad Waters" – 4:29
8. "Only Here for the Fight" – 4:55
9. "Pass Me the Salt" – 3:19
10. "Motherhood" – 1:06
11. "Hardships" – 4:24
12. "We Had Everything" – 5:32
13. "Strings of Grass" – 4:37

== Charts ==
Chart (2009)	Peak position
Danish Albums Chart	23
Finnish Albums Chart	37
Norwegian Albums Chart	31
Swedish Albums Chart	7
