= Kikkert =

Kikkert is a surname. Notable people with the surname include:

- Elizabeth Kikkert (born 1980), Australian politician
- Jan Elias Kikkert (1843–1925), Dutch lithographer and watercolorist
