= Love and Youth =

Studio album by Jenny Wilson
- Released: 2005
- Length: 47:51

Jenny Wilson chronology
Love and Youth (2005)	Hardships! (2009)

Love and Youth is the debut album by Jenny Wilson. Released in April, 2005, it reached #26 on the Swedish albums chart. Two singles were released from the album: 'Summer Time - The Roughest Time', and 'Let My Shoes Lead Me Forward'.

In 2011, it was placed at number three on NME's The 100 Greatest Albums You've Never Heard list.

== Track listing ==
1. "Crazy Summer" – 3:18
2. "Summer Time - The Roughest Time" – 3:32
3. "Let My Shoes Lead Me Forward" – 4:27
4. "Those Winters" – 3:33
5. "Bitter? No, I Just Love to Complain" – 4:24
6. "Would I Play with My Band?" – 4:07
7. "Love and Youth" – 4:34
8. "A Hesitating Cloud of Despair" – 3:07
9. "Love Ain't Just a Four Letter Word" – 5:10
10. "Common Around Here" – 4:09
11. "Hey, What's the Matter?" – 4:58
12. "Balcony Smoker" – 2:32
