= Junior Senior =

Danish pop duo (1998–2008)

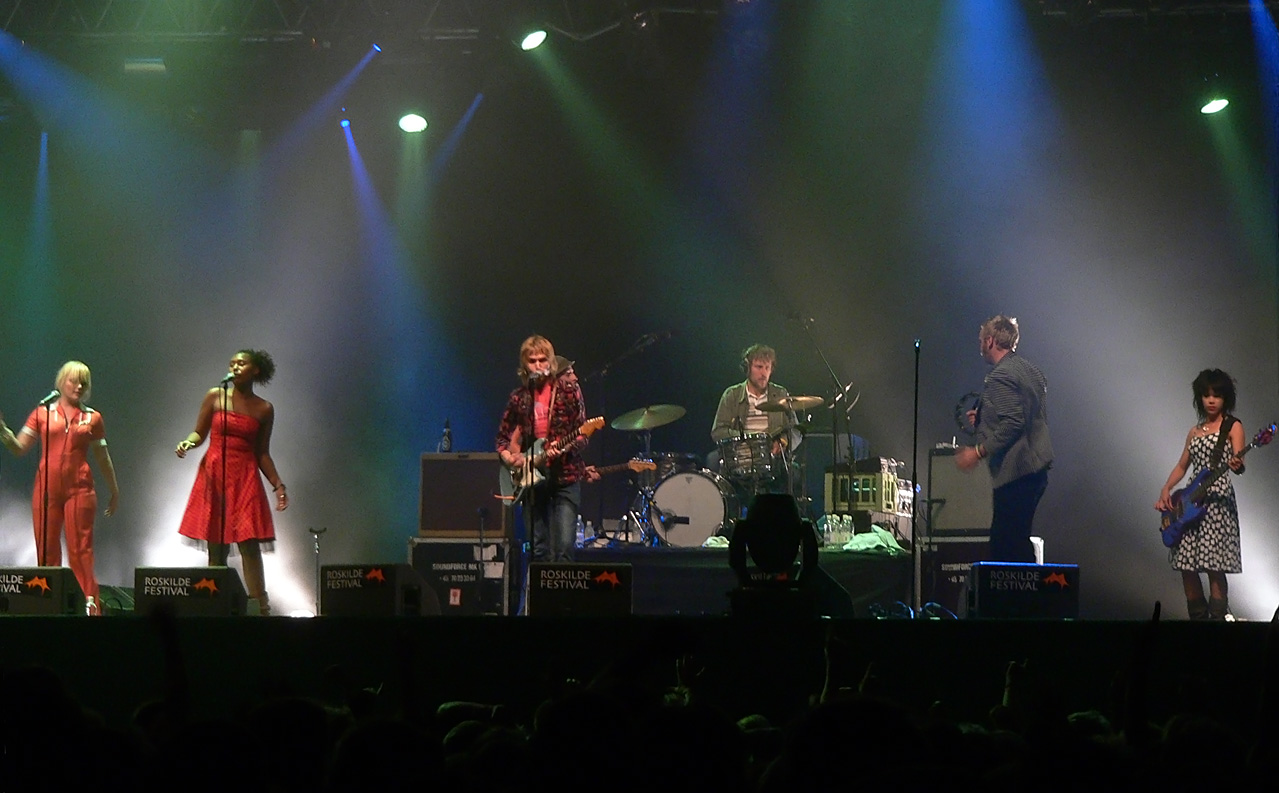
- Junior Senior in 2005

Background information
- Origin: Thisted, Denmark
- Genres: Pop, rock, dance, electronic
- Years active: 1998–2008
- Labels: EMI, Crunchy Frog, Atlantic
- Spinoffs: Make Out
- Spinoff of: Ludo-X
- Past members: Jesper Mortensen; Jeppe Laursen

Junior Senior were a Danish pop duo. The duo consisted of Jesper "Junior" Mortensen (vocals, guitar, keyboards, bass guitar, drums, percussion) (born 7 February 1979) and Jeppe "Senior" Laursen (vocals, programming) (born 25 December 1977). They became best known for their 2002 single "Move Your Feet", which gained worldwide success in 2003, most notably in the United Kingdom.

== History ==
=== Early career ===
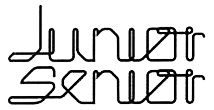
Band logo

Junior Senior formed in 1998 when Jesper Mortensen and Jeppe Laursen reunited after the disbandment of their previous band Ludo-X in 1995. The band signed a deal with Danish label Crunchy Frog Records.

=== D-D-Don't Don't Stop the Beat ===
The band released their debut album D-D-Don't Don't Stop the Beat in 2002. The first single, "Move Your Feet", was one of the most played songs on Danish radio and eventually entered the charts in over thirteen countries, including the United States, Australia, France, and the United Kingdom. The song was included on the soundtrack of the American television show Queer Eye for the Straight Guy, featured in the Northern American music video game Dance Dance Revolution Extreme for the PlayStation 2, and included in the Wii game, Just Dance 2. It is associated with its animated pixel art music video. It was also featured in the films White Chicks (2004), Looney Tunes: Back in Action (2003), and How to Eat Fried Worms (2006) as the "finishing" song before and during the end credits.

The second single, "Rhythm Bandits", made the charts in the UK and Australia, and was included on the soundtrack of the game FIFA Football 2004.

D-D-Don't Don't Stop the Beat was included in several publications' "Best Albums of 2003" lists, including Rolling Stone, NME, Entertainment Weekly and Blender. The Sunday Chronicle rated "Move Your Feet" as the single of the year, calling it "the best song ever".

The CD features the video to "Move Your Feet" (made by designer group Shynola) and a "Making Of" as enhanced content.

The third single "Shake Your Coconuts" was featured on the Looney Tunes: Back in Action soundtrack, and is used as the menu music in the game Worms 3D by Team17. It was also featured in the 2004 film Confessions of a Teenage Drama Queen and the Malcolm in the Middle season 5 episode "Experiment". In addition, on 21 July 2017, the band Phish used the song as the opening song for their first show of a 13-night run at Madison Square Garden dubbed "The Baker's Dozen". The song coincided with free coconut donuts given to the audience.

The song "White Trash" from this album was used in the advertisement for the music magazine television show Popworld in the United Kingdom. The promo featured the two presenters of the show doing a synchronized dance routine to the song while wearing identical outfits.

=== Hey Hey My My Yo Yo ===
Junior Senior released their second album, Hey Hey My My Yo Yo, on 24 August 2005 in Japan. It was released in the US in 2007. The first single from the album was "Itch U Can't Skratch". The track "Take My Time" features Cindy Wilson and Kate Pierson of new wave band The B-52s. "Take My Time" was also featured in the PSP video game Lumines II. Motown girl group The Velvelettes provided backing vocals on seven of the album tracks.

In February 2006 and March 2006, the band held a contest for fans to appear in a music video for their song "Can I Get Get Get". The song "Can I Get Get Get" was used on the television shows Ugly Betty, Cavemen, Castle, Eastbound & Down and was featured in the film What Happens in Vegas. This song was also featured on the Nordic edition of Lips as an on-disc song as well as downloadable content worldwide. The music video for this song was released on 25 July 2006.

"Hip Hop a Lula" was featured in a Sears back-to-school commercial in August 2007. It was used extensively in Network Ten Australia's advertising in 2008.

=== Disbandment ===
Mortensen and Laursen announced on their blog that they would split and pursue solo projects on 26 September 2008. Both Mortensen and Laursen have since worked on other projects. In 2008, Mortensen released a single called "Trust Tissue" under the moniker I Scream Ice Cream on Kitsune Records. In 2010, Mortensen formed the group Make Out. Laursen began working on a debut album, which released the Big Lucky EP in May 2009.

== Discography ==
=== Studio albums ===
Title	Album details	Peak chart positions				
Title	Album details	DEN	JPN	UK	US	US Dance
D-D-Don't Don't Stop the Beat	Released: 4 March 2002; Label: Atlantic, Crunchy Frog; Formats: CD, digital download	—	—	29	94	—
Hey Hey My My Yo Yo	Released: 24 August 2005; Label: Crunchy Frog; Formats: CD, digital download	20	2	—	—	5
"—" denotes releases that did not chart.

=== EPs ===
Title	Extended play details	Peak chart positions
Title	Extended play details	DEN
Boy Meets Girl EP	Released: 10 June 2003; Label: Crunchy Frog; Formats: CD, digital download	—
Say Hello, Wave Goodbye EP	Released: 21 August 2007; Label: Crunchy Frog; Formats: CD, digital download	5
"—" denotes releases that did not chart.

=== Singles ===
Year	Title	Peak chart positions					Album
Year	Title	DEN	AUS	FRA	UK	US Dance	Album
2002	"Move Your Feet"	4	20	11^{A}	3	45	D-D-Don't Don't Stop the Beat
2003	"Rhythm Bandits"	—	47	—	22	—	D-D-Don't Don't Stop the Beat
2003	"Shake Your Coconuts"	—	—	—	—	—	D-D-Don't Don't Stop the Beat
2005	"Itch U Can't Skratch"	—	—	—	—	—	Hey Hey My My Yo Yo
2005	"Can I Get Get Get"	—	—	—	—	—	Hey Hey My My Yo Yo
"—" denotes releases that did not chart or were not released in that territory.

Footnotes

- British chart reference
- ^{A}Originally peaked at number 29 in France in 2003, but reached number 11 in a re-release in 2013

== Awards and nominations ==
Year	Association	Category	Nominated work	Result
2003	MTV Europe Music Awards	Best Dance	Themselves	Nominated
2003	MTV Europe Music Awards	Best Nordic Act	Themselves	Nominated
2003	MTV Europe Music Awards	Web Award	www.juniorsenior.com	Nominated
2003	Q Awards	Best Video	"Move Your Feet"	Nominated
