= Jan Elias Kikkert =

Dutch painter

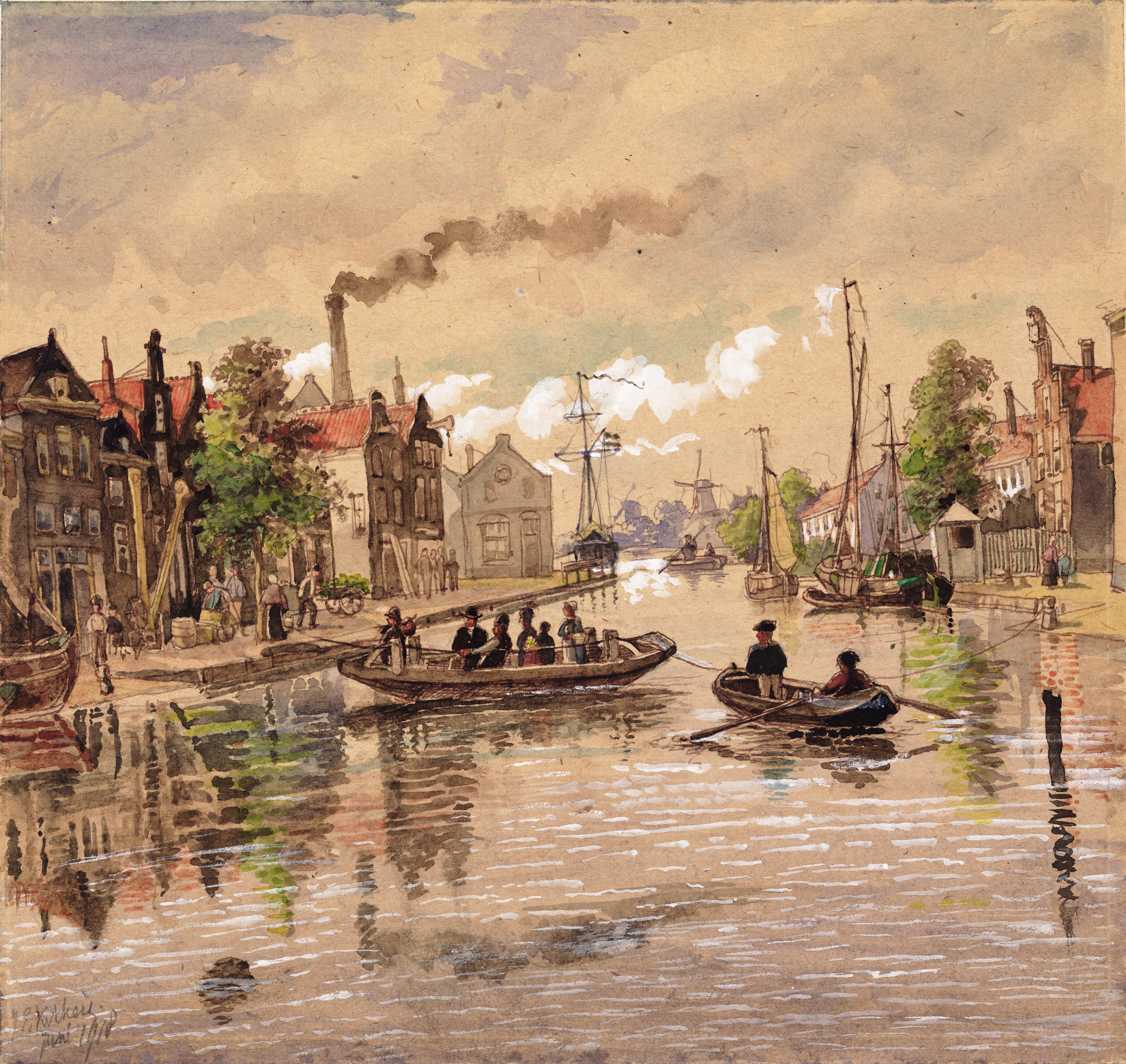
The Galgewater with a Ferry (and an atypical factory chimney)

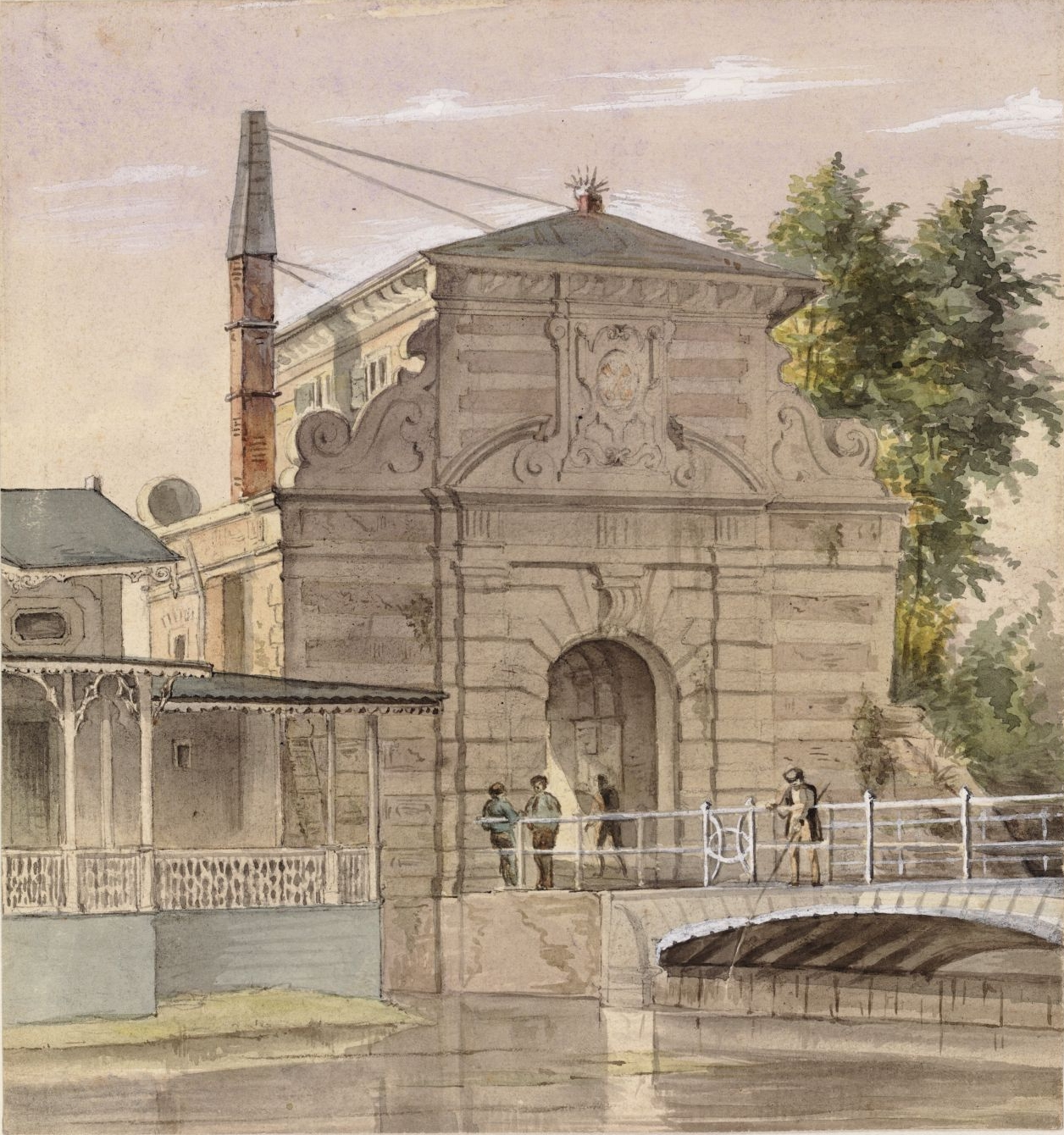
The Rijnsburgerpoort (city gate)

Jan Elias Kikkert (24 June 1843, Amsterdam – 11 April 1925, Leiden) was a Dutch lithographer and watercolorist, best known for his street scenes of Leiden.

== Biography ==
His mother was unmarried at the time of his birth and the name of his father is not on record. His grandfather, Pieter Kikkert (1775-1855), was a prominent drawing teacher in Leiden who published a popular book of sketches with essays. Jan showed an early aptitude for drawing and went to Leiden where he studied with his grandfather in the evenings while attending classes at a school operated by the "Mathesis Scientiarum Genitrix a math society.

At the age of seventeen, he found employment with the lithographer, Gerardus Johannes Bos. From 1860 to 1869, he worked as a designer at the silversmithing firm of Van Kempen & Begeer in Voorschoten. He then returned to work with Bos, preparing the stones for color lithographs. After Bos died, he worked part-time for the printing firm of P.W.M. Trap, while promoting his own works.

He would often wander the streets of Leiden, sketching and making notes which would accompany the final paintings. An interesting feature of his work is that "modern" elements such as factory chimneys and railway lines are sometimes omitted because he was looking to express the "stemming in de natuur" (mood in nature).

He was a long-time member of "Ars Aemula Naturae", an art society founded in 1694, where he was known for his light-hearted and humorous behavior. From 1875 to 1878, he served as the coordinator of the society's evening events.

As he aged, his right arm grew increasingly stiff; eventually becoming paralyzed and preventing him from painting. At the beginning of 1925, possibly as the result of a stroke, he became bedridden and died a few weeks later. The Leiden Regional Archive has a collection of over 900 of his drawings and watercolors.
