= Tiger Tunes =

- Origin: Denmark
- Genres: Indie pop Indie rock Lo-fi
- Years active: 2001–2007
- Labels: netMusicZone Records; V2 Records merged with Artemis Records
- Website: Official Site

Tiger Tunes was a Danish indie pop band. Formed in 2001, the band initially used the internet to distribute their music, releasing two singles from their album Forget About the Stupid Rocket Idea! In 2003, the band played at several festivals in Denmark: Roskilde, Midtfyns and at the Skanderborgfestival. Although only releasing a few singles, the band won the Steppeulv Award in the "Newcomer of the Year" category in 2004. Despite this early success, the band's later works failed to gain recognition, and they later disbanded.

== Members ==
- Mr Q – Programming and drums
- K. R. Hansen – Vocals
- Knø – Guitar
- Marie – Synth and vocals
- Lasse Lakken – Bass and synth

== Discography ==
- Forget About the Stupid Rocket Idea! (2004)
- Absolutely Worthless Compared To Important Books (2005)
- Foolio (2005)
- Pancake America (2005)
