= Jenny Wilson (singer) =

Swedish singer-songwriter

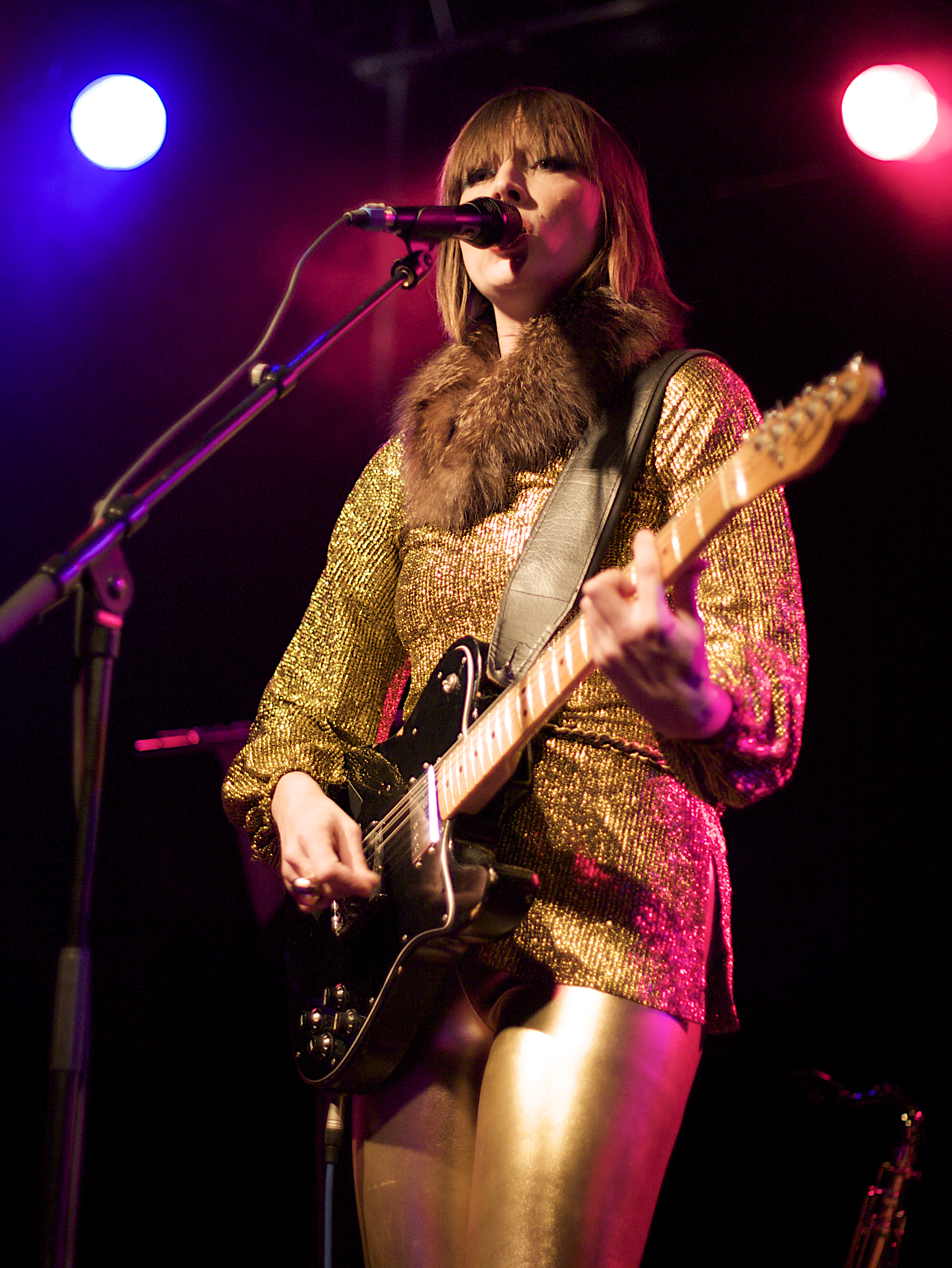

Background information
- Born: 20 October 1975 (age 50); Blekinge, Sweden
- Genres: art pop
- Years active: 1997–present
- Formerly of: First Floor Power
- Website: https://thejennywilson.com/

Jenny Wilson (born 20 October 1975) is a Swedish singer-songwriter. Her music has a distinct electro-influenced style.

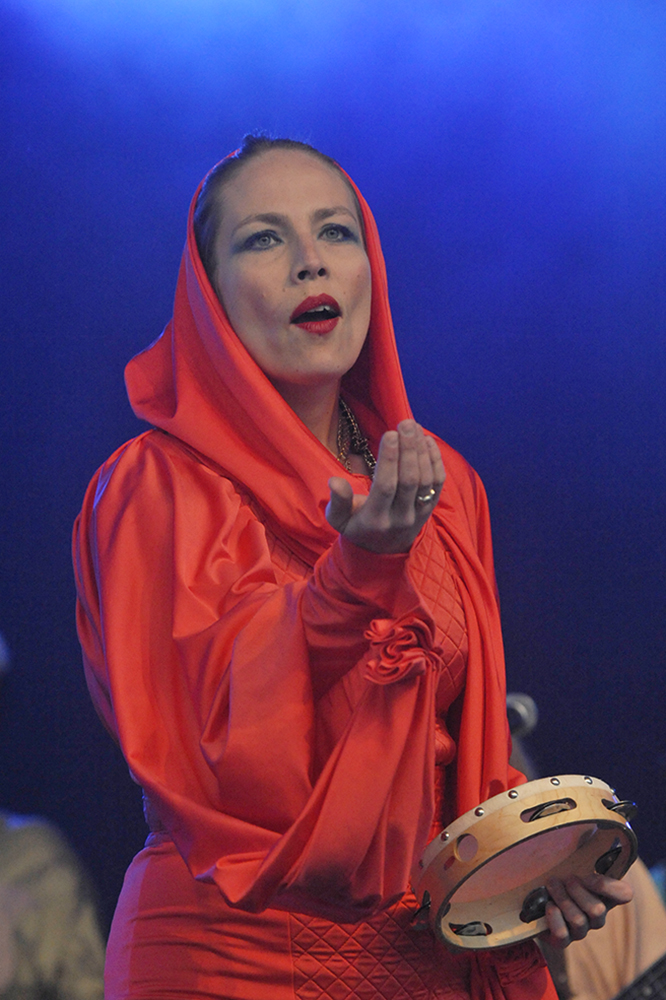
Jenny Wilson performing at the Stockholm Jazz Festival 2010.

== Career ==
Wilson founded the band First Floor Power in 1997 and released two albums, There Is Hope and Nerves, before leaving the band to go solo around 2004. She also studied graphic design at Konstfack for one year.

Wilson was signed to The Knife's Rabid Records, and was a guest vocalist on The Knife's album Deep Cuts on the song You Take My Breath Away which is about The Knife's Karin Dreijer Andersson going to a First Floor Power show. Wilson is also featured in the music video for the song.

Wilson's debut solo album Love and Youth was released in 2005 in Sweden and then, in August 2006, in Australia on Hussle Recordings' album imprint (later to launch independently as etcetc). The first single from the album, Summertime – The Roughest Time, received extensive airplay on Triple J. In 2010, her first album was included in NME's "The 100 Greatest Albums You've Never Heard" list. It was chosen by Elly Jackson of La Roux.

In November 2006, Wilson appeared on Robyn's promotional The Rakamonie EP, featuring in a live recording of the song List of Demands.

On 25 February 2009, Wilson self-released her second solo album Hardships! on CD and vinyl. In January 2010 Wilson won a European Border Breakers Award for her international success.

In the summer of 2010, Wilson was diagnosed with breast cancer. After undergoing chemotherapy she went into remission.

In 2011 Wilson released her third album Blazing; a re-recorded counterpart to her previous album Hardships!

Wilson made a short film Beyond that Wasteland with director Daniel Wirtberg in 2011; it was filmed in Iceland and premiered in Sweden in October 2012.

Wilson began work on her fourth album Demand The Impossible in 2012 after finishing a Scandinavian tour for her previous album Blazing. However, she then found out that her cancer had returned. She continued to work on the new album whilst undergoing treatment and then during the recovery process. Demand The Impossible was released in 2013.

In 2018 Wilson announced her fifth album, Exorcism, released on 23 March.

== Discography ==
Year	Album	Peak positions	Certification
Year	Album	SWE	Certification
2005	Love and Youth	26	
2009	Hardships!	7	
2011	Blazing	–	
2013	Demand the Impossible!	17	
2018	Exorcism	37	
2019	Trauma (mit Hans Ek, Norrköpings Symfoniorkester)		
