= Jeppe Laursen =

Danish singer-songwriter and producer (born 1977)

- Born: Jeppe Breum Laursen; 25 December 1977 (age 48); Thisted, Denmark
- Genres: Pop; dance; rock; electronic
- Occupations: Singer-songwriter; record producer
- Instruments: Vocals; guitar; keyboards; programming
- Years active: 1998–present
- Formerly of: Junior Senior

Jeppe Breum Laursen (born 25 December 1977) is a Danish singer-songwriter and record producer.

== Career ==
=== Early years in a duo ===
Performing under the name "Senior", Laursen was the lead vocalist of the pop duo Junior Senior. In 2008, the British magazine Dazed & Confused praised Laursen's music for its "urgency and club appeal" and described it as "industrial synth-pop and bone-rattling drama".

=== Solo career ===
His first solo release was a duet with American electronic music duo Classixx entitled "I'll Get You", which was released in 2009 on Kitsuné Records. Laursen's song "Lucky Boy" was a contender for Denmark's entry for the 2009 Eurovision Song Contest. Laursen also remixed "Off Our Backs" by American electropop band MEN in 2010.

=== Works with Lady Gaga ===
Laursen co-wrote and co-produced Lady Gaga's 2011 single "Born This Way", the title track from her second studio album of the same name. The song reached number one on the Billboard Hot 100 on 16 February 2011.

== Personal life ==
Laursen is openly gay.

== Discography ==
Singles

- Lucky Boy (2009)
- Big Boy (2009)
- I Don't Know What To Do featuring The Magician (2011)

Original production

- Classixx – "I'll Get You" featuring Jeppe (2009, Kitsuné Records)
- Lady Gaga – "Born This Way" (2011, Interscope Records)

Remix work

- MEN – "Off Our Backs" (Jeppe's Money is a Major Issue Remix) (2010, IAMSOUND Records)
