= Crunchy Frog Records =

Crunchy Frog
- Founded: 1994
- Founder: Thau
- Genre: Alternative rock, indie rock
- Country of origin: Denmark
- Location: Copenhagen
- Official website: www.crunchy.dk

Crunchy Frog is a Danish independent record label, established in 1994 in Copenhagen, Denmark. The idea for Crunchy Frog came from the four members of the band Thau. The daily operations are handled by Jesper "Yebo" Reginal Petersen, drummer of Thau.

From the beginning, Crunchy Frog has signed bands on a 50/50 basis. The company also operates a publishing and syncing company, a booking agency, and is partners in two of Copenhagen’s drinking establishments, The Mudhoney and Whammy Bar. The name of the record company is taken from a Monty Python sketch.

== Bands signed or formerly signed ==
- 18th Dye
- Apparat Organ Quartet
- Beta Satan
- Düreforsög
- EPO-555
- First Floor Power
- Heavy Trash
- I Am Bones
- Junior Senior
- Learning From Las Vegas
- The Malpractice
- The Mopeds
- Powersolo
- The Raveonettes
- Shiny Darkly
- Sista Bossen
- Superheroes
- THAU
- Tothe International
- The Tremolo Beer Gut

== See also ==
- List of record labels
