= Krampus in popular culture =

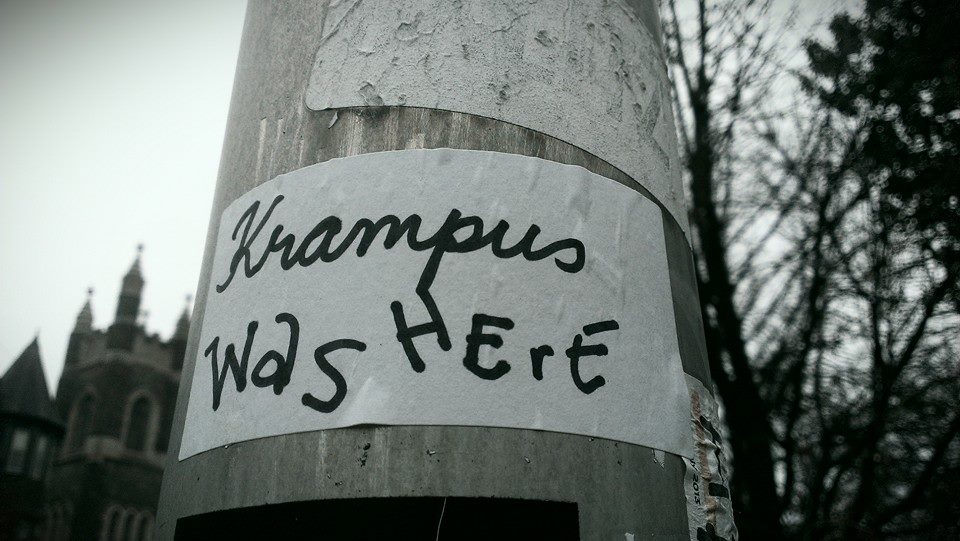
Sign on a pole in University City, late 2014

Krampus, the "Christmas Devil" of Austrian and Bavarian folklore, has entered the popular culture of North America; Christian Jacobs notes that "thanks to the Internet and YouTube, (Note: A short film called A Krampus Carol was produced in 2011 for Anthony Bourdain: No Reservations but never aired, as the Travel Channel considered it inappropriate; "Luckily, the special lives on on YouTube". Seth Abramovitch (December 12, 2011). "Travel Channel Pulls Touching Christmas Special About a Child-Licking Demon". Gawker. Archived from the original on December 18, 2015.) [Krampus] is now very much on America's Christmas radar." Tanya Basu interprets this as part of a "growing movement of anti-Christmas celebrations": a "bah, humbug" rejection of – or novel alternative to – mainstream festivities. Brian Joines of Image Comics suspects that the reason Krampus (specifically, as well as dark aspects of Christmas in general) has not been historically popularized in America is a social artifact resulting from "the nature of how we view Christmas in this country, both as a big day for kids and as the birth of a big religious figurehead". In some North American depictions, Krampus is an antihero who seeks to prevent children from becoming spoiled by rampant consumerism flowing from the economics of Christmas.

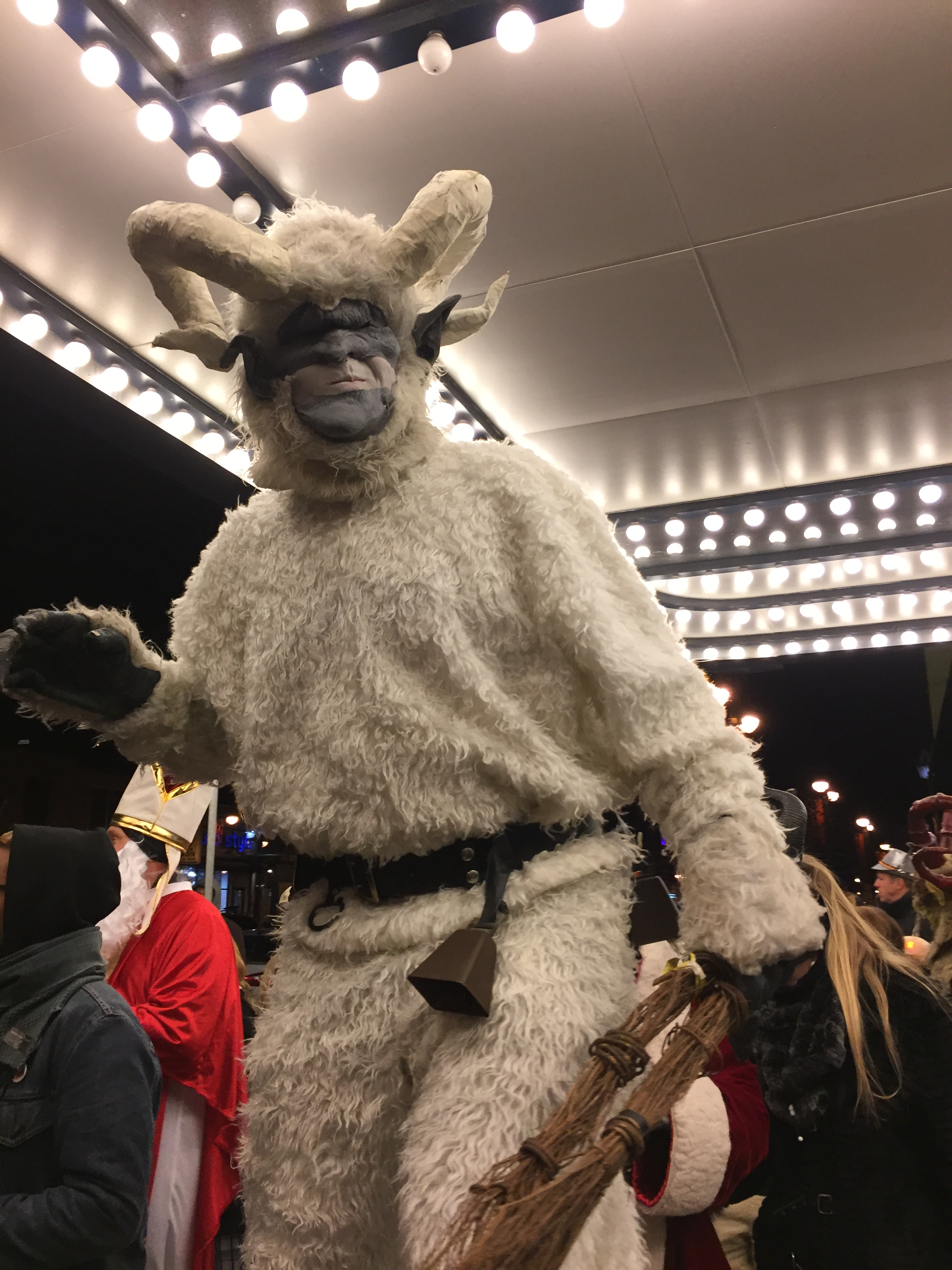
Washington DC Krampusnacht walk, 2016.

== Film ==
- Krampus: The Christmas Devil: a direct-to-video horror film (2013).
- vom Krampus: zwischen Latexhaut und Schaffell: video-documentary film (2013).
- Krampus: The Reckoning: a direct-to-video horror film (2015).
- Krampus: a horror comedy (2015) from Universal Pictures, where Krampus is physically portrayed by Luke Hawker and voiced by Gideon Emery.
- A Christmas Horror Story: an anthology film where Krampus is featured (2015).
- Krampus: The Devil Returns: a direct-to-video horror sequel to Krampus: The Christmas Devil (2016).
- Krampus Unleashed: a direct-to-video horror film (2016).
- Mother Krampus: a direct-to-video horror film (2017).
- The Three Wise Kings vs Santa: a Spanish comedy film (2022). Krampus serves as the overreaching antagonist, portrayed by Adal Ramones.

=== In production ===
- Anti-Claus (initially titled Comes the Krampus), from Kevin Smith.
- Happy Krampus!, from Walden Media and The Jim Henson Company.

== Television ==
- G4 commercial (2003). Christmas carolers outside a house sing a dirge about Krampus, who has entered to punish the naughty children inside.
- The Colbert Report segment "The Blitzkrieg on Grinchitude - Hallmark & Krampus" (2009), regarding the so-called 'War on Christmas'.
- "The Devil of Christmas" (2016), an episode of Inside No. 9 features the figure.

=== Animation ===
- In the Scooby-Doo! Mystery Incorporated episode "Wrath of the Krampus" (2012), the Krampus, voiced by Carlos Alazraqui serves as a major villain in the episode.
- In the American Dad! Christmas episode "Minstrel Krampus" (2013), The Krampus, voiced by Danny Glover with the singing voice provided by Charles Bradley, is a major character.
- The Cartoon Network series Regular Show episode "Christmas in Space", features the antagonist Krampus (voiced by Fred Tatasciore).
- The Robot Chicken episode "The Robot Chicken Christmas Special: The X-Mas United" features Krampus as Santa's opponent on a college debate tour in 2002. Both Santa and Krampus have sex with a groupie, but Krampus does not use a condom and fathers "The Nerd", a recurring Robot Chicken character. The episode was first broadcast on December 13, 2015 on the Adult Swim programming block of the Cartoon Network. In the next season, the episode "Freshly Baked: The Robot Chicken Santa Claus Pot Cookie Freakout Special: Special Edition" features Krampus (voiced by Jason Alexander) as the leader of a rock band called "Krampus". It was first broadcast on December 10, 2017, on Adult Swim. In the next season, the episode "Robot Chicken's Santa's Dead (Spoiler Alert) Holiday Murder Thing Special" features Krampus as a suspect in the murder of Santa Claus, who was later revealed to be Tim Allen in a Santa Claus costume.

=== Live action ===
- The League episode "A Krampus Carol" (2012).
- The Aquabats! Super Show! episode "Christmas with The Aquabats!" (2013). Voiced by Robert Smigel in a German accent.
- Grimm episode "Twelve Days of Krampus" (2013). Depicted as a man who annually transforms into Krampus (Derek Mears) to kidnap and eat "naughty" children on Christmas.
- Lost Girl episode "Groundhog Fae" (2013).
- Murdoch Mysteries episode "A Merry Murdoch Christmas" (2015, season 9). A sighting of Krampus is reported on the night a philanthropist dressed as Santa is murdered at a Christmas Gala. Inspector Brackenreid has a nightmare of his boyhood encounter with Krampus.

== Print media ==
- Krampus: The Devil of Christmas (2004), by Monte Beauchamp collects early 1900s Krampus postcards
  - Art director and graphic designer Monte Beauchamp published Krampus postcards from the 19th and 20th centuries in his magazine BLAB! after being introduced to them by a collector. He then had two books of Krampus postcards published in 2004 and 2010. An exhibit was mounted in a gallery in Santa Monica, and a friend of Beauchamp's opened a Krampus-themed club in Los Angeles.
- Chickenhare graphic novel (2006), had a Krampus named Banjo as one of the main characters.
- Krampus: The Yule Lord novel (2012), by Gerald Brom set in Boone County, West Virginia. (Note: ISBN 978-0-06-209565-7. Brom's Krampus page.)

== Others ==
- CarnEvil arcade game (1998), has a "freakishly evil St. Nick" boss named Krampus.
- Random Spirit Lover album (2007), by the Canadian indie band Sunset Rubdown, features a picture of Krampus on the back cover. Spencer Krug stated that it was placed there because "he represents the sort of duality that's a theme on the record, the two sides of every thing."
- The single "Naughty Christmas" (2016) by Italian band Lacuna Coil mentions Krampus repeatedly throughout the song.
- Krampus: A Yuletide Tale, a musical by Carrie Gilchrist (book, lyrics) and Nils-Petter Ankarblom (book, music, lyrics), was first produced at Short North Stage in Columbus, Ohio in December 2015.
- Krampus appears in the Killing Floor 2 map Krampus Lair, released during the Twisted Christmas 2017 update. Krampus appears as a boss who must be defeated at the end of the map.
- In the Doctor Who audio drama series Ravenous (2018), the two-part "Better Watch Out" and "Fairytale of Salzburg" sees the Eighth Doctor and his companions attend a Christmas celebration in Salzburg, only for a mysterious wish-granting entity to grant a wish that makes the Krampus real. As the Krampus (Robert Whitelock) nearly sends the whole city to Hell, the Doctor's companion Helen Sinclair is able to find the original Saint Nicholas (Raad Rawi) and bring him to the present so that he can command the Krampus to depart, as tradition states that only Saint Nick can command the Krampus.
- Overwatch, an online video game by Blizzard Entertainment, features a customized Krampus skin for the character Junkrat in their "Overwatch Winter Wonderland" event.

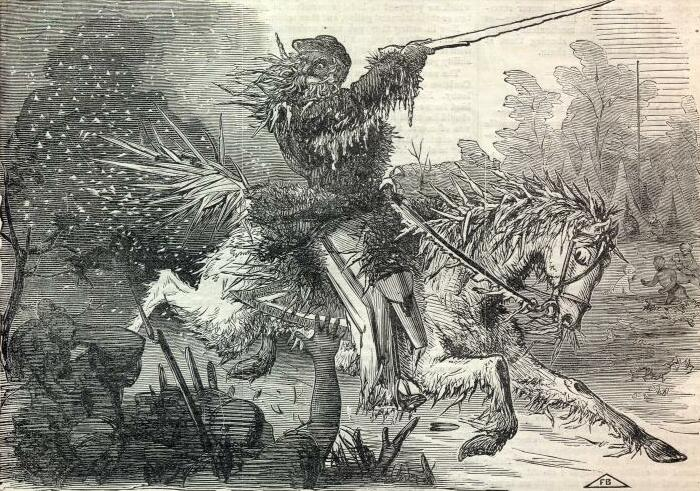
Jack Frost in Harper's Weekly (1861)

- In a 2022 episode of The Family Histories Podcast, Krampus suddenly breaks into host Andrew Martin's garage where he keeps his time machine. Krampus is soon knocked unconscious by the 19th Century Hungarian poet and revolutionary Sándor Petőfi, and they learn that he is carrying a scroll listing the show's naughty guests. Krampus is zapped back into time to a random date.
