= Robot Chicken season 11 =

Robot Chicken
- Season 11
- Cover art for digital downloads.
- No. of episodes: 20

Release
- Original network: Adult Swim
- Original release: September 7, 2021 – April 11, 2022

Season chronology
- ← Previous; Season 10

The eleventh season of the stop-motion television series Robot Chicken began airing in the United States on Cartoon Network's late night programming block, Adult Swim, on September 7, 2021. (Note: Adult Swim lists the show's eleventh season as premiering on September 6, 2021 at 12:00 a.m. (24:00) EST/PST, which is effectively September 7.) The first 12 episodes aired on every week of September 2021, while the rest of the episodes in the season aired from February 21 to April 11, 2022.

As of 2026, season 11 is the only season of the series not to be produced by Sony Pictures Television, and it is also the last season produced before switching primarily over to TV specials.

== Episodes ==
No. overall	No. in season	Title	Directed by	Written by	Original release date	Prod. code	US viewers (millions)
201	1	"May Cause a Whole Lotta Scabs"	Tom Sheppard	Maggie Cannan, Mike Fasolo, Seth Green, Zoe Katz, Matthew Senreich, Tom Sheppard, Josh Lehrman, Kyle Stegina & Erik Weiner	September 7, 2021	1101	0.43
The season starts with a 2001: A Space Odyssey parody; Barbie gets in a rap battle; The Hamburger Helper hand doesn't help a hot dog; Robot Chicken takes Inside Out's Riley further inside and even more out; Santa has an epiphany while grocery shopping; the Voltron team comes down with the flu; A Star Is Born, but Lady Gaga's character is played by a shopping cart; Neo can't swallow the red pill; The Red Skull battles his ultimate nemesis, loneliness; Rey gets more than she bargained for at the Skywalker homestead.
202	2	"May Cause Light Cannibalism"	Tom Sheppard	Maggie Cannan, Mike Fasolo, Seth Green, Zoe Katz, Matthew Senreich, Tom Sheppard, Josh Lehrman, Kyle Stegina & Erik Weiner	September 8, 2021	1102	0.37
Why a zombie apocalypse on April Fool's Day is a bad idea; The Mountain from Game of Thrones fights a classic Panic Pete stress relieving toy; the Gargoyles get as hard as stone, if you know what Robot Chicken means; Solid Snake must master the walk of shame; The Smurfs get attacked by defecating birds; Monopoly's newest version tackles pay discrimination based on gender; how Magic Mike went from failed magician to male stripper; a man slips on a banana peel and into a gorilla enclosure; a realistic ending to Moulin Rouge!; the Cookie Monster is a heartless landlord; the monsters from Yo Gabba Gabba! talk about death; The Avengers learn to curb their enthusiasm.
203	3	"May Cause Immaculate Conception"	Tom Sheppard	Maggie Cannan, Mike Fasolo, Seth Green, Zoe Katz, Matthew Senreich, Tom Sheppard, Josh Lehrman, Kyle Stegina & Erik Weiner	September 9, 2021	1103	0.32
Rube Goldberg uses one of his complicated machines during sex; a parade bell ringer talks to Genie; a parody of Say Anything...; an installment of The Young and the Plastic; Robot Chicken asks if Totoro is overweight and doesn't like the answer; Jigsaw outgrows his tricycle; wearing a "World's Best Dad" T-shirt may cause a Highlander-style quest; The Washington Generals destroy the entire world of basketball; why Arnold from Hey Arnold! never met his parents; Drake and Josh "Face/Off".
204	4	"May Cause the Exact Thing You're Taking This to Avoid"	Tom Sheppard	Maggie Cannan, Mike Fasolo, Seth Green, Zoe Katz, Matthew Senreich, Tom Sheppard, Josh Lehrman, Kyle Stegina & Erik Weiner	September 10, 2021	1104	0.38
The Night King raps; Disney's live-action remaking hits a new low when The Story of Menstruation becomes their next big hit; Jamiroquai gets breakfast; a little girl takes a Rorschach test; Dumbo tries to laugh while crying inside; the swan that was Björk's dress in 2001 comes out of his melatonin coma; Luke Skywalker is a little too comfy inside that Tauntaun; Obi-Wan Kenobi uses Jedi mind tricks on a job interview; Billy, Mandy, and Grim fly on Malaysia Airlines Flight 370; what happens to Bob Ross's happy little trees; Midsommar's big problem was it wasn't cute enough.
205	5	"May Cause One Year of Orange Poop"	Tom Sheppard	Maggie Cannan, Mike Fasolo, Seth Green, Jamie Loftus, Harmony McElligott, Matthew Senreich & Tom Sheppard	September 14, 2021	1105	0.38
Robot Chicken shows you how Batman Beyond's training goes way beyond Batman's training; A deleted scene makes Cats a masterpiece; Bitch Pudding is determined to bring it on.
206	6	"May Cause Random Wolf Attacks"	Tom Sheppard	Maggie Cannan, Mike Fasolo, Seth Green, Jamie Loftus, Harmony McElligott, Matthew Senreich & Tom Sheppard	September 15, 2021	1106	0.42
Robot Chicken locks and loads for a Darkwing Duck hunt; The show's greatest warriors assemble for a battle beyond the stars; Even Cobra Commander can't resist the Tiger King.
207	7	"May Cause Lucid Murder Dreams"	Tom Sheppard	Maggie Cannan, Mike Fasolo, Seth Green, Jamie Loftus, Harmony McElligott, Matthew Senreich & Tom Sheppard	September 16, 2021	1107	0.33
Naruto has trained and the Robot Chicken writers see if he's ready for the test or not; The Force evolves into something new and deadly; Robot Chicken teaches Martin Scorsese a few things about filmmaking.
208	8	"May Cause Numb Butthole"	Tom Sheppard	Maggie Cannan, Mike Fasolo, Seth Green, Jamie Loftus, Harmony McElligott, Matthew Senreich & Tom Sheppard	September 17, 2021	1108	0.33
The Robot Chicken writers had fun in health class, but it's no laughing matter if you're an Alien; The Kingdom Hearts gang has another use for their keys; The Robot Chicken Nerd has a monstrous Housewives nightmare.
209	9	"May Cause the Need for Speed"	Tom Sheppard	Maggie Cannan, Chelsea Davison, Mike Fasolo, Seth Green, Noah Prestwich, Matthew Senreich & Tom Sheppard	September 21, 2021	1109	0.35
Robot Chicken introduces Velma to a whole new benefit of joining the Scooby gang; The Care Bears are a friend to girls everywhere when you know; The Nerd explores the pros and cons of The Sims' sexuality.
210	10	"May Cause Your Dad to Come Back With That Gallon of Milk He Went Out for 10 Years Ago"	Tom Sheppard	Maggie Cannan, Chelsea Davison, Mike Fasolo, Seth Green, Noah Prestwich, Matthew Senreich & Tom Sheppard	September 22, 2021	1110	0.36
Can Peppa Pig's love of muddy puddles do her dirty? Robot Chicken says yes; Smaug has another use for Hobbits; Fievel discovers being an American citizen comes with shocking responsibilities.
211	11	"May Cause Episode Title to Cut Off Due to Word Lim"	Tom Sheppard	Maggie Cannan, Chelsea Davison, Mike Fasolo, Seth Green, Noah Prestwich, Matthew Senreich & Tom Sheppard	September 23, 2021	1111	0.33
Robot Chicken helps George R. R. Martin finish his novel; The Road Runner knows how to exploit the Coyote; The Mos Eisley Cantina is an unlikely but perfect spot for a bachelorette party. Note: This is the mid-season finale.
212	12	"Happy Russian Deathdog Dolloween 2 U"	Tom Sheppard	Maggie Cannan, Mike Fasolo, Seth Green, Michael Poisson, Matthew Senreich, Tom Sheppard, Ellory Smith & Cody Ziglar	September 24, 2021	1112	0.32
The Nerd is caught in a time loop where he continually heads to a Halloween party and is killed in gruesome ways from a killer with an oversized peach as its head. When he attempts to get revenge, the Nerd is constantly thwarted by his own undoing until he finally gets it right and gets into a big battle. Finally, it turns out that the killer is Loopy the Time Loop Toucan and the Halloween party ensues until plane parts come in crashing through the ceiling. Note: This is the first ever Halloween special.
213	13	"May Cause Indecision...Or Not"	Tom Sheppard	Maggie Cannan, Chelsea Davison, Mike Fasolo, Seth Green, Noah Prestwich, Matthew Senreich & Tom Sheppard	February 21, 2022	1113	0.34
According to Robot Chicken, Fred Flintstone's meaning of Christmas is madness; Freddy Krueger's nightmare is a weirdo's wet dream; We interview a toilet.
214	14	"May Cause Bubbles Where You Don't Want 'Em"	Tom Sheppard	Maggie Cannan, Mike Fasolo, Seth Green, Michael Poisson, Matthew Senreich, Tom Sheppard, Ellory Smith & Cody Ziglar	February 28, 2022	1114	0.24
From the minds of the writers at Robot Chicken, it's time for Medusa to get her freak on; The Pirates of Dark Water visit Flint, Michigan; Yarael Poof returns to see how the Star Wars saga ends.
215	15	"May Cause a Squeakquel"	Tom Sheppard	Maggie Cannan, Mike Fasolo, Seth Green, Michael Poisson, Matthew Senreich, Tom Sheppard, Ellory Smith & Cody Ziglar	March 7, 2022	1115	0.29
Robot Chicken takes Mojo Jojo's side against the Powerpuff Girls; Nightwing demands criminals butt out; Dilbert dies hard with a vengeance of laughter!
216	16	"May Cause Involuntary Political Discharge"	Tom Sheppard	Maggie Cannan, Mike Fasolo, Seth Green, Michael Poisson, Matthew Senreich, Tom Sheppard, Ellory Smith & Cody Ziglar	March 14, 2022	1116	0.24
Robot Chicken lets Yoshi get his revenge on Mario once and for all; a period so bad it requires a famous exorcist to fix; Snoopy trains a new crew of WWI flying aces.
217	17	"May Cause an Excess of Ham"	Tom Sheppard	Maggie Cannan, Mike Fasolo, Seth Green, Zoe Katz, Noah Prestwich, Matthew Senreich, Tom Sheppard & Kevin Shinick	March 21, 2022	1117	0.26
Robot Chicken tells the Lion King tale from the wildebeests' point of view; what happens when a mouse accepts a browser cookie; The Golden Girls discover the otherworldly and deadly secret behind St. Olaf.
218	18	"May Cause Internal Diarrhea"	Tom Sheppard	Maggie Cannan, Mike Fasolo, Seth Green, Zoe Katz, Noah Prestwich, Matthew Senreich, Tom Sheppard & Kevin Shinick	March 28, 2022	1118	0.22
Robot Chicken helps Dexter bring his robot mother to market but buyers go off-label; the Itsy Bitsy Spider doesn't know what the hell he's doing; visiting the land of Disney's dead parents.
219	19	"May Cause Weebles to Fall Down"	Tom Sheppard	Maggie Cannan, Mike Fasolo, Seth Green, Zoe Katz, Noah Prestwich, Matthew Senreich, Tom Sheppard & Kevin Shinick	April 4, 2022	1119	0.27
Once again it's time for Discovery's Mark Week courtesy of Robot Chicken; nobody realizes Daria is being sarcastic until it's too late; the Wayne family's Murder Alley gets commercialized and Bruce is mad!
220	20	"May Cause Season 11 to End"	Tom Sheppard	Maggie Cannan, Mike Fasolo, Seth Green, Zoe Katz, Noah Prestwich, Matthew Senreich, Tom Sheppard & Kevin Shinick	April 11, 2022	1120	0.30
The Robot Chicken gang thinks Barbie George Washington would've made a fine Floundering Father; The Nerd fixes the Mandela Effect with disastrous results; the return of the Noid; Robot Chicken finishes its eleventh season with a SNL-style wrap-up, as well as a surprise Venture Bros. sneak preview.
