= Krampus (film) =

2015 film by Michael Dougherty

- Theatrical release poster
- Directed by: Michael Dougherty
- Written by: Todd Casey; Michael Dougherty; Zach Shields
- Produced by: Thomas Tull; Jon Jashni; Alex Garcia; Michael Dougherty
- Starring: Adam Scott; Toni Collette; David Koechner; Allison Tolman; Conchata Ferrell; Emjay Anthony; Stefania LaVie Owen; Krista Stadler
- Cinematography: Jules O'Loughlin
- Edited by: John Axelrad
- Music by: Douglas Pipes
- Production companies: Legendary Pictures; Zam Pictures
- Distributed by: Universal Pictures
- Release date: December 4, 2015
- Running time: 98 minutes
- Countries: United States; New Zealand
- Language: English
- Budget: $15 million
- Box office: $61.5 million

Krampus is a 2015 Christmas comedy horror film based on the eponymous character from Austro-Bavarian folklore. Directed, co-written, and produced by Michael Dougherty, the film's ensemble cast is led by Adam Scott, Toni Collette, David Koechner, Allison Tolman, Conchata Ferrell, Emjay Anthony, Stefania LaVie Owen, and Krista Stadler. It tells the story of young boy who loses his festive spirit, following a dysfunctional family squabble, and inadvertently unleashes the wrath of Krampus, a demonic spirit who punishes naughty people during Christmas time.

The concept for Krampus began in 2011, when Dougherty was planning to make a Christmas-themed horror film, with him and Shields writing the screenplay. Production on the film began in 2014, with Dougherty directing and writing a new screenplay with Shields and Casey. The casting call began from November 2014 to March 2015. Principal photography on the film began on March 12 and wrapped in May 2015. Creature effects were made by Weta Workshop.

Krampus was released in the United States on December 4, 2015, by Universal Pictures. It received mixed reviews and grossed over $61 million against a $15 million budget.

== Plot ==
Three days before Christmas, the Engel family—parents Tom and Sarah, daughter Beth, son Max, and Tom's mother, whom the family calls Omi—prepares for the holidays. Despite his family's dysfunction, Max still believes in Santa Claus and writes him a letter with Omi's encouragement. Sarah's sister, Linda, brings her family and bulldog Rosie to come visit and stay for the holiday, along with their cantankerous Aunt Dorothy. This fuels tension, as Tom hates Linda's husband Howard, and Linda's children Stevie, Jordan and Howie Jr., don't get along with Max or Beth.

When his cousins mockingly read his letter to Santa, Max attacks them and lashes out, yelling that he hates his family and Christmas. His father attempts to comfort him by telling him that even though the holidays are chaotic, he should always love his family. Despite his father's efforts to cheer him up, Max angrily tears up the letter and tosses it out his bedroom window. Later that night, a severe blizzard engulfs the town, causing a power outage.

The next day, Beth ventures out to check on her boyfriend. A large, horned creature chases her. She hides beneath a delivery truck, but the creature leaves a jack-in-the-box, which seemingly comes to life and kills her. When Beth does not return home, Tom and Howard search for her. They find her boyfriend's house in ruins. Tom narrowly saves Howard from The Snow Beast, an unseen monster in the snow. They return home and board up the windows.

That night, a living gingerbread man lures Howie Jr. to the chimney, chains him up and kidnaps him. The family tries to save him, but are distracted by a fire that burns down their Christmas tree. Omi explains that the creature hunting them is Krampus, an ancient demon who punishes those that have lost the Christmas spirit. When she was a child, her family lost their spirit due to the hardships of the war in Europe. She eventually lost hope and wished for everyone to be taken away, summoning Krampus. He and his helpers attacked her family’s village and dragged everyone (except her) to the Underworld, leaving behind a bell-shaped bauble with his name on it.

The family remains skeptical of the story until the house is overrun by violent living toys that appear from presents Krampus left behind. Jordan is devoured by Der Klown, the same demonic toy that took Beth, who also seemingly eats Rosie. The family fends off the toys and more gingerbread men, until Krampus's minion elves leap in through the window, taking Howard and Dorothy, along with Linda's newborn baby, Chrissie.

Tom leads the rest of the family to an abandoned snowplow on the streets, while Omi stays behind to face Krampus, who emerges from the fireplace and attacks her with his bag of toys. Outside, Tom, Sarah, and Linda are dragged under the snow by The Snow Beast that attacked Howard earlier while Stevie is captured by the dark elves. Krampus confronts Max and gives him a bauble wrapped in pieces of his discarded letter. Realizing that he was responsible for summoning Krampus, Max chases after the demon and confronts him at the edge of a fiery pit. Max begs to sacrifice himself to bring his family back. Krampus laughs and tosses Stevie into the pit. Max sincerely apologizes for losing his spirit, telling him he wanted Christmas the way it used to be, and Krampus, recognizing this as truth, tosses Max into the pit anyway.

Max awakens in his bed on Christmas morning and discovers his family alive and well, concluding what happened was just a nightmare. However, after finding Krampus's bauble among the presents, the family exchanges troubled looks. Meanwhile, Krampus uses hundreds of enchanted snow globes in his underworld lair to watch the houses he has tormented, with the Engel family's among them. (Note: The prequel graphic novel Krampus: Shadow of Saint Nicholas revealed that anyone spared by Krampus will be kept on surveillance by him through their respective snow globes in his underworld lair in the mountains of Central Europe to make sure they never lose their Christmas spirit again.)

== Cast ==
- Emjay Anthony as Max Engel, a boy who loses the Christmas spirit due to his dysfunctional family's squabbling.
- Adam Scott as Tom Engel, the father of Max.
- Toni Collette as Sarah Engel, the mother of Max.
- David Koechner as Howard Jackson Sr., the maternal uncle of Max.
- Allison Tolman as Linda Jackson, the sister of Sarah and maternal aunt of Max.
- Conchata Ferrell as Aunt Dorothy, the aunt of Sarah and Linda and maternal great-aunt of Max.
- Stefania LaVie Owen as Beth Engel, the teenage sister of Max and daughter of Tom and Sarah.
- Krista Stadler (de) as 'Omi' ('Granny') Engel, the mother of Tom and paternal grandmother of Max and Beth.
- Lolo Owen as Stevie Jackson, the daughter of Howard and Linda and the maternal cousin of Max and Beth.
- Queenie Samuel as Jordan Jackson, the daughter of Howard and Linda and the maternal cousin of Max and Beth.
- Maverick Flack as Howard "Howie" Jackson Jr., the son of Howard and Linda and the maternal cousin of Max and Beth.
- Sage Hunefeld as Baby Chrissie Jackson, the baby daughter of Howard and Linda and the maternal cousin of Max and Beth.
- Mark Atkin as Ketkrókur
- Leith Towers as Derek, Beth's boyfriend
- Curtis Vowell as a DHL Man who delivers stuff to the Engel family's house.
- Luke Hawker as Krampus (in-suit performer), a dark ancient demonic figure from European folklore that dispenses vengeance and wrath on the naughty. He resembles a much darker representation of Santa Claus, appearing as a hunchbacked beast with goat-like horns, goat hooves, claws, and his true face concealed behind a bearded mask.
- Mark Atkin as Ketkrókur, a dark Christmas elf in a devilish grin mask with fork and knife-resembling horns.
- Amy Brighton as Þvörusleikir, a dark Christmas elf in a dark eagle mask.
- Trevor Bau as Hurðaskellir, a dark Christmas elf in a goat-horned ogre mask.
- Ravi Narayan as Kertasníkir, a dark Christmas elf in an excited boy mask.
- Felicity Hamill as Gáttaþefur, a dark Christmas elf in a plague doctor mask.
- Sophie Gannon as Bjúgnakrækir, a dark Christmas elf in a mask that resembles a man posing as an Indian woman.
- Kelly Lily Marie as Giljagaur, a dark Christmas elf in a mask that resembles a man posing as an Indian woman that was later killed by the Snow Beast.
- Clare Odell as Gluggagægir, a dark Christmas elf in a mask that resembles a smiling old woman.
- Gareth Ruck as Stekkjarstaur, a dark Christmas elf in a horned demonic mask.
- Pascal Ackerman, Skye Broberg, and Jessie Carson as the Yule Goats, three large skull-faced goats that pull Krampus' sleigh.
- Thor and Victoria as Rosie, Linda's pet bulldog.

=== Voices ===
- Gideon Emery as Krampus (uncredited)
- Seth Green, Breehn Burns, and Justin Roiland as Lumpy, Dumpy, and Clumpy, three gingerbread men who target Howard on Krampus' behalf.
- Ivy George as Perchta the Cherub, one of Krampus' killer toys.
- Brett Beattie as Der Klown, a demonic Jack-in-the-box who is one of Krampus' killer toys.
- Collin Dean as Ruprecht the Elf, a female dark Christmas elf wearing an Indian woman mask.

== Production ==
Michael Dougherty had "always wanted to do a scary Christmas movie", but the idea did not take form until his friends sent him an e-card featuring the Krampus creature which was, according to him "just love at first sight." Although this, according to Dougherty, happened in "the ancient times of the internet" the project would not be fleshed out until 2011, at which point he would team up with Zach Shields and Todd Casey to figure out the story. On November 21, 2014, Allison Tolman and Emjay Anthony joined the cast. On March 3, 2015, Adam Scott, David Koechner, and Toni Collette joined the cast. Principal photography began on March 12, 2015, and officially wrapped in May 2015 at Stone Street Studios in New Zealand. Creature effects were made by Weta Workshop. The score was composed by Douglas Pipes and released on a double LP by Waxwork Records in 2018.

== Release ==
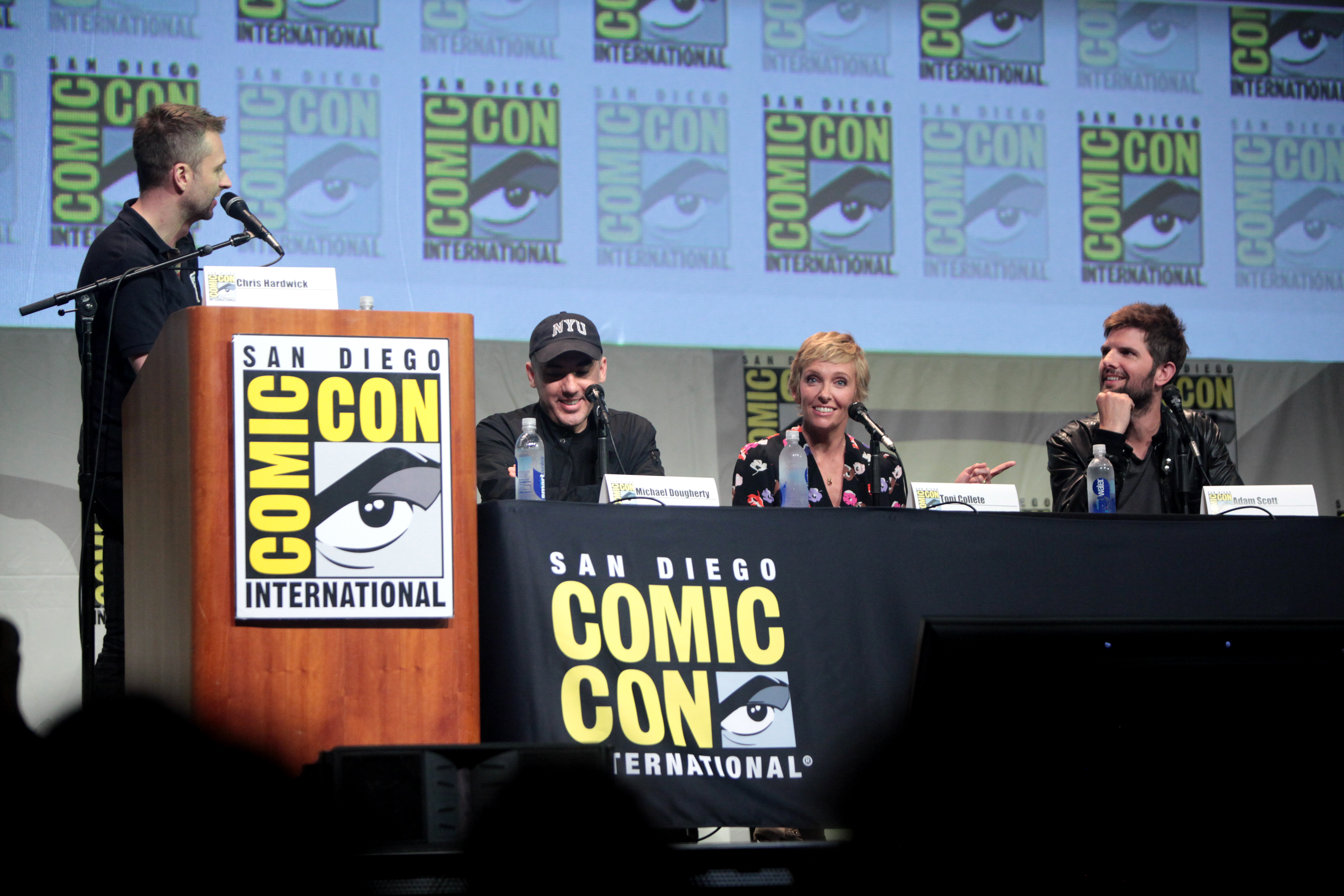
(L-R) Moderator Chris Hardwick, director Michael Dougherty, and cast members Toni Collette and Adam Scott at the 2015 San Diego Comic-Con to promote the film.

The film was originally scheduled to be released on November 25, 2015, but was moved to December 4, 2015, to be closer to December 5, which is Krampusnacht.

The film was released on DVD and Blu-ray by Universal Pictures Home Entertainment on April 26, 2016, and was internationally released on the same formats in the United Kingdom on December 26, 2016. An unrated, extended version of the film referred to as Krampus: The Naughty Cut was released on December 7, 2021, by Shout! Factory in a 4K and Blu-ray combo pack. This release features new bonus content such as interviews, commentaries, and featurettes, and runs approximately four minutes longer than the original theatrical edition.

== Merchandise ==
An original graphic novel titled Krampus: Shadow of Saint Nicholas was released on November 25, 2015, by Legendary Comics. The comic is written by Brandon Seifert and features stories by writer/director Michael Dougherty and movie co-writers Zach Shields and Todd Casey. Art is provided by Fiona Staples, Michael Montenat, Stuart Sayger, Maan House and Christian DiBari.

Weta Workshop released a number of collectables through their online store, including statues (Krampus, The Cherub, The Dark Elf), a life-sized prop reproduction of the Krampus Bell and a collectable pin.

Trick or Treat Studios released three Halloween Masks directly out of the screen used masters. The masks include Krampus and two elves, Window Peeper and Sheep Cote Clod.

The popular Halloween store Spirit Halloween released a Halloween animatronic based on the main character Krampus.

== Reception ==
=== Box office ===
Krampus grossed $42.7 million in the United States and Canada and $18.8 million in other territories for a worldwide total of $61.5 million, against a budget of $15 million.

In North America, Krampus earned $637,000 from its Thursday night showings, which began at 7 p.m., and topped the box office on its opening day with $6 million. It rose 9.9% on Saturday over Friday, a rare occurrence for a horror film. It went on to earn $16.3 million through its opening weekend from 2,902 theaters, which was above expectations and finished in second place at the box office, ahead of The Good Dinosaur, but behind The Hunger Games: Mockingjay – Part 2 ($18.6 million), which was on its third weekend. Scott Mendelson of Forbes felt the successful opening was attributed to the horror genre which was something of a new, unique and genuinely different offering at that time (the last time a Christmas-themed horror film opened was in 2006 with Black Christmas). However, he also stated that had Universal not embargoed the reviews two days prior to its release, the mostly positive reviews dropping a few days before release would have boosted its opening accordingly.

=== Critical response ===
On Rotten Tomatoes, the film has an approval rating of 66% based on 130 reviews with an average rating of 6.1/10. The website's critical consensus reads "Krampus is gory good fun for fans of non-traditional holiday horror with a fondness for Joe Dante's B-movie classics, even if it doesn't have quite the savage bite its concept calls for." On Metacritic, the film has a weighted average score of 49 out of 100, based on 21 critics, indicating "mixed or average" reviews. Audiences polled by CinemaScore gave the film an average grade of "B−" on an A+ to F scale.

=== Accolades ===
Krampus earned a pair of nominations for Best Horror Film from the Empire Awards and the Saturn Awards.

== See also ==
- Krampus in popular culture
- List of comedy horror films
- List of holiday horror films
