= Robot Chicken season 10 =

Robot Chicken
- Season 10
- Cover art for digital downloads
- No. of episodes: 20

Release
- Original network: Adult Swim
- Original release: September 30, 2019 – July 27, 2020

Season chronology
- ← Previous; Season 9 Next → Season 11

The tenth season of the stop-motion television series Robot Chicken began airing in the United States on Cartoon Network's late night programming block, Adult Swim, on September 30, 2019, (Note: Adult Swim lists the show's tenth season as premiering on September 29, 2019 at 12:00 a.m. (24:00) EST/PST, which is effectively September 30.) containing 20 episodes.

== Episodes ==
No. overall	No. in season	Title	Directed by	Written by	Original release date	Prod. code	US viewers (millions)
181	1	"Ginger Hill in: Bursting Pipes"	Tom Sheppard	Mike Fasolo, Shelby Fero, Seth Green, Matthew Senreich, Tom Sheppard, Ellory Smith and Andrew Ti	September 30, 2019	1001	0.62
The Robot Chicken Nerd tells a little girl how he survived jumping the cliff from last season's finale; Shredder uses plastic straws to defeat the Teenage Mutant Ninja Turtles; Deadpool, Elliot Alderson from Mr. Robot, Frank Underwood from the American version of House of Cards, and Jim Halpert from the American version of The Office are all in rehab for their fourth-wall breaking; the L.O.L. Surprise dolls get a new, disgusting roommate; Netflix reboots Mr. Rogers' Neighborhood; Thelma and Louise's famous cliff jump has a Grease-style twist; Popeye gets a modern-day revival; Steve Urkel is featured in A Quiet Place; Tamagotchi aliens brainwash Earth kids into caring for them; and Bitch Pudding is the latest handmaiden on The Handmaid's Tale. Guest stars: Alex Borstein, Dave Coulier, Mikey Day, Katee Sackhoff, Susan Sarandon, Ariel Winter
182	2	"Bugs Keith in: I Can't Call Heaven, Doug"	Tom Sheppard	Mike Fasolo, Seth Green, Jamie Loftus, Michael Poisson, Matthew Senreich, Tom Sheppard and Milana Vayntrub	September 30, 2019	1002	0.61
Larry Loompa, Personal Injury Attorney; Harold from Harold and the Purple Crayon fights back against his abusive father; a Treasure Troll goes on a date; the Chuck E. Cheese animatronic band try to help their broken friend, Pasqually the Chef; a magician's act causes a national tragedy; Winnie the Pooh changes his diet due to colony collapse; The Queer Eye guys try to make over Ursula; on the latest episode of Comedians in Cars Getting Coffee, Jerry Seinfeld rides with The Joker; a cheery doctor creates a human centipede; a Pin Mates version of Star Trek; The Ugly Duckling; The Handmaid's Tale as played by Barbie and Ken dolls; Rocky and Bullwinkle's friendship is torn apart thanks to Boris and Natasha playing on conservative and liberal stereotypes; Ariana Grande's ponytail has a life of its own; Miss Frizzle from The Magic School Bus now drives the Fortnite Battle Bus. Guest stars: D'Arcy Carden, Tamara Garfield, Laura Ortiz, Mark Hamill, Arielle Kebbel, Ross Marquand, George Takei, Fred Tatasciore, Milana Vayntrub
183	3	"Fila Ogden in: Maggie's Got a Full Load"	Tom Sheppard	Mike Fasolo, Seth Green, Jamie Loftus, Michael Poisson, Matthew Senreich, Tom Sheppard and Milana Vayntrub	October 7, 2019	1003	0.60
April O'Neil interviews Donald Trump; a Saturday Night Live-style opening for Robot Chicken; The Fast and the Furious 9 (mph): Zamboni Rising; Belle from Beauty and the Beast orders food and calls the cops on The Beast; Baby Piercer; Indiana Jones and the One Time He Respected a Woman's Wishes; DJ Marshmello gets run over by a graham cracker truck and a chocolate truck; Optimus Prime has sex with a self-driving car; a PSA about marsupial roadkill featuring Rocko from Rocko's Modern Life; Pee-wee's Playhouse gets a Fixer Upper makeover; an extended scene from Alien: Covenant; the Pale Man visits the optometrist; Darth Vader and Luke Skywalker share screaming "NO!"s in the famous reveal scene from The Empire Strikes Back; Cinderella strips for Jaq and Gus; The Overwatch League on ESPN. Guest stars: Abraham Benrubi, Bob Bergen, Rachel Bloom, Ralph Garman, Linsey Godfrey, Adam Ray, Christian Serratos
184	4	"Hermie Nursery in: Seafood Sensation"	Tom Sheppard	Mike Fasolo, Seth Green, Jamie Loftus, Michael Poisson, Matthew Senreich, Tom Sheppard and Milana Vayntrub	October 7, 2019	1004	0.55
Princess Leia comes back to life in Super Space Leia; Harry Potter uses the magic of firearms to take down Voldemort; the truth behind the Hindenburg disaster and the famous "Oh, the humanity!" phrase; Perseus kills Medusa, then gets turned to stone by Mandusa; a commercial for Ryan, Barbie's new toxic boyfriend; Yogi Bear dies during a tree rescue; a girl gets a deformed Hatchimal; The Queer Eye guys try their luck in making over The Babadook; The Impossible Mission Force sends Ethan Hunt a new mission box; "Cheetos for Her"; The League of Predatory Men help get a woman's cat out of a tree; and a mash-up of The Handmaid's Tale and Grease's "Summer Nights" song. Guest stars: Genevieve Angelson, Clancy Brown, Anna Camp, Eden Espinosa, Jamie Loftus, Rachael MacFarlane, Ross Marquand, Kathryn Prescott
185	5	"Garfield Stockman in: A Voice Like Wet Ham"	Tom Sheppard	Mike Fasolo, Shelby Fero, Seth Green, Matthew Senreich, Tom Sheppard, Ellory Smith and Andrew Ti	October 14, 2019	1005	0.66
Freddy Krueger is getting married, but wonders who his father is in "Murder Mia"; a dorky Predator; Manny the Mammoth drowns Roshan's mother; Bucky Barnes becomes the "Summer Soldier"; A daughter of a plastic army man wants her slab removed; Steve Urkel in Fortnite; A football mascot accidentally shoots himself with a T-Shirt cannon; Godzilla becomes "Super Godzilla"; A football mascot's head lands in the stands; Hell's flames set off sprinklers; The Totally Spies violate international law and develop PTSD; Lucy van Pelt refuses to give her grandfather heart pills; Oskar Schindler thinks he could have done more; The Eagles play for Gandalf the Grey; Belle sings about feudal France; Tripod third legs; The hypocrisy behind High School Musical. Guest stars: David Costabile, Kat Graham, Camilla Luddington, Drew Seeley, Dan Soder, Catherine Taber
186	6	"Boogie Bardstown in: No Need, I Have Coupons"	Tom Sheppard	Mike Fasolo, Shelby Fero, Seth Green, Matthew Senreich, Tom Sheppard, Ellory Smith and Andrew Ti	October 14, 2019	1006	0.61
A Monty Python's Flying Circus inspired RC opening; Officer Big Mac investigates the murder of Mayor McCheese; The RC writers imagine what happened to average citizens during Thanos' Snap; Meet the Bratz; Call Me by Your Name with fruit; Stretch Armstrong gets accused of witchcraft and is sentenced to execution; G.I. Joe rethinks its strategy when up against a ruthless dictator of oppressed citizens; A neutered dog persuades his boy to neuter his drunk father; Baby Shark in a crossover with Jaws; a Honda guy investigates JonBenét Ramsey's death; The Midnight Society's newest horror story; Ethan Hunt's wacky disguises; SpongeBob, Bob Belcher, Linguini and Chef appear on MasterChef: Celebrity Showdown. Guest stars: John Bradley, Rachael Leigh Cook, Sarah Jeffery, Ross Marquand, Chris Messina, Adrianne Palicki, Bill Ratner, Gary Anthony Williams
187	7	"Snoopy Camino Lindo in: Quick and Dirty Squirrel Shot"	Tom Sheppard	Mike Fasolo, Shelby Fero, Seth Green, Matthew Senreich, Tom Sheppard, Ellory Smith and Andrew Ti	October 21, 2019	1007	0.68
Blumhouse Productions presents Don't Fall Down; Megamind can't fit into an MRI; Velma catches an early breast cancer tumor; a centaur and a minotaur cry over their human child; Dracula figures out a way to attack someone without being invited into a house; an ATM mugging is really a scene for the new movie, Ocean's One; Noah's Ark meets Titanic; Robot Wars presents: RoboCop vs. his Chinese knock-off RoboCarp; The Yellow Brick Road's depressing origin story; Liv and Maddie get sexually harassed in Hollywood; Punchy is in an S&M relationship with the Kool-Aid Man; A fat Slender Man; The 5th Annual Brodeo; The Island of Recalled Toys. Guest stars: Charlet Chung, Clare Grant, Jason Isaacs, Matthew Lillard, Sarah Snook, Mae Whitman
188	8	"Molly Lucero in: Your Friend's Boob"	Tom Sheppard	Mike Fasolo, Shelby Fero, Seth Green, Matthew Senreich, Tom Sheppard, Ellory Smith and Andrew Ti	October 21, 2019	1008	0.64
A prosecution request has Thanos try on the Infinity Gauntlet to see if it fits; RC finds out what goes on behind Bert and Ernie's closed bedroom doors; Dr. Alexander performs a very complicated conjoined twins separation, Leeroy Jenkins style; An interrogation about Keyser Söze does not go so well in a distracting empty room; Father Burke is trapped inside a coffin with a farting Nun; RoboCop's old software has trouble with upgraded technology when trying to prove that Dick Jones is a murderer; The Wizard of Oz nearly offers a gift to a stowaway Flying Monkey; Andy's toys try to rescue their kid from a new toy that has "brainwashed" him, a video game console; Betty Spaghetty gets stuck in an elevator door; Elisa makes a mistake in feeding the Amphibian Man too much fish food; A Poopsie Unicorn has a special kind of Slime Surprise; James T. Kirk has a coffee to an unresponsive Khan; Mr. Peanut "liberates" a family of peanut refugees; Godzilla: The Musical comes to Broadway. Guest stars: Mikey Day, Melissa Rauch, Frankie Shaw, Tiffany Shepis, Eddie Shin, Fred Tatasciore, Victor Yerrid
189	9	"Spike Fraser in: Should I Happen to Back Into a Horse"	Tom Sheppard	Nick Cron-Devico, Mike Fasolo, Sasha Feiler, Seth Green, Jared Gruszecki, Michael McMillian, Breckin Meyer, Matthew Senreich and Tom Sheppard	October 28, 2019	1009	0.66
Pop Goes the Weasel, quite literally; Thanos presents a new fragrance by Hugo Versace, Infinity; Sauron becomes Lord of the "Water" Rings; Bambi discovers the real truth on what happened to his mother; Paddington Bear, but an actual bear; Marco the Animorph helps save the Red Pandas from extinction; Brainy Smurf develops CTE after being thrown out of the Smurf Village one too many times; The Punisher targets criminals during an alien invasion; Steve is in court trying to solve a murder case; E.T. says goodbye to Earth, leaving no witnesses; Cheetah finally takes care of her arch nemesis, Princess Diana, almost; The origin of Skeletor's name; the true assassin of John F. Kennedy is revealed; The Children of the Night perform Mozart; a Predator's wife and child wonder what happened to their husband and father; Bitch Puddin' visits the Bates Motel. Guest stars: Tiffany, Todd Haberkorn, Alison Haislip, Thomas Jane, Chris Pine, Katee Sackhoff, Aimee Teegarden
190	10	"Musya Shakhtyorov in: Honeyboogers"	Tom Sheppard	Nick Cron-DeVico, Mike Fasolo, Sasha Feiler, Seth Green, Jared Gruszecki, Michael McMillian, Breckin Meyer, Matthew Senreich and Tom Sheppard	October 28, 2019	1010	0.63
RC writer Doug Goldstein leaves his phone outside the bathroom Simon & Garfunkel style; Presenting, The Squatch Squad; Indiana Jones takes a drunk Marion on an adventure; The RC writers take a look into Westley's life as the Dread Pirate Roberts; Clone Troopers wonder what it's like having sex with one another; Morpheus teaches Neo all about Bitcoin; The Wuzzles meet a new animal hybrid, Brundlefly; A Honey Bear bottle has trouble letting out its juices; Dr. Ian Malcolm's view on Isla Nublar's active volcano gets a dissenting opinion, from a Velociraptor; Gooey Louie rides an airplane, much to the dismay of one of the passengers; Adolf Hitler has trouble when his officers fail to bring back fictional items from different films; a cat ruins Ben and Wolfgang's plans to build an alien spaceship; An Alien Pez Dispenser; Superman arrives on Earth, only to abandon it due to global warming; Goliath requires Elisa to leave him when the sun rises; Bill & Ted's last greatest adventure. Guest stars: Dee Bradley Baker, Nicole Eggert, Keith Ferguson, Jameela Jamil, Chelsea Kane, Ross Marquand, Keke Palmer, Michael Rosenbaum, Robert Sheehan, Alex Winter
191	11	"Robot Chicken's Santa's Dead (Spoiler Alert) Holiday Murder Thing Special"	Tom Sheppard	Deirdre Devlin, Mike Fasolo, Seth Green, Jamie Loftus, Harmony McElligott, Breckin Meyer, Michael Poisson, Matthew Senreich and Tom Sheppard	December 10, 2019	1011	0.65
When Santa Claus gets murdered on Christmas Eve, it's up to Inspector Jesus H. Christ to solve the case in this murder mystery holiday special to know who could've done it. Guest stars: Jason Alexander, Wayne Knight, Zahn McClarnon, Emmy Raver-Lampman, Gina Rodriguez, Timothy Simons
192	12	"Max Caenen in: Why Would He Know If His Mother's a Size Queen"	Tom Sheppard	Nick Cron-Devico, Mike Fasolo, Sasha Feiler, Seth Green, Jared Gruszecki, Michael McMillian, Breckin Meyer, Matthew Senreich and Tom Sheppard	June 29, 2020	1013	0.48
The Lady of the Lake gives Percival some trouble when he goes to return Excalibur to her; The Robot Chicken crew shows what Dumbledore sees when he looks into the Mirror of Desire; Professor X reveals how the X-Men first discovered their powers; And Garfield gets buried in the pet cemetery. Guest stars: Dianna Agron, Donald Faison, Tom Hollander, Kayvan Novak, Iliza Shlesinger, Bella Thorne
193	13	"Petless M in: Cars Are Couches of the Road"	Tom Sheppard	Deirdre Devlin, Mike Fasolo, Seth Green, Jamie Loftus, Harmony McElligott, Breckin Meyer, Michael Poisson, Matthew Senreich and Tom Sheppard	June 29, 2020	1014	0.48
The RC writers imagine Harry Potter as a 70's sitcom; We answer the question of what's underneath Abe Lincoln's hat; The future looks bleak for Nostradamus's assistant; And the Jonas Brothers learn they are more than just brothers. Guest stars: Nichole Bloom, Kieran Culkin, Keith Ferguson, Emile Hirsch, Minka Kelly, Alfred Molina, Okieriete Onaodowan, Haley Joel Osment, Daniella Pineda
194	14	"Buster Olive in: The Monkey Got Closer Overnight"	Tom Sheppard	Deirdre Devlin, Mike Fasolo, Seth Green, Jamie Loftus, Harmony McElligott, Breckin Meyer, Michael Poisson, Matthew Senreich and Tom Sheppard	July 6, 2020	1015	0.61
Tyrion Lannister learns the true meaning of winter is coming; Blade tries to slice his way into infomercials; Inside-Out Boy goes to college; Meet the latest hit superhero - Superglue!; The Robot Chicken writers show what happens when Halloween meets Home Alone. Guest stars: Jenna Dewan, Maya Erskine, Boyd Holbrook, Kevin Michael Richardson, Jeremy Sisto, Jill Talley, Ed Weeks, Brad Williams
195	15	"Ghandi Mulholland in: Plastic Doesn't Get Cancer"	Tom Sheppard	Deirdre Devlin, Mike Fasolo, Seth Green, Jamie Loftus, Harmony McElligott, Breckin Meyer, Michael Poisson, Matthew Senreich and Tom Sheppard	July 13, 2020	1016	0.45
Good Will Hunting goes "Goodwill Hunting"; Pennywise the Dancing Clown shows off some new moves; A Fortnite contractor is hired to build a house; The RC crew reimagines The Adventures of Pete & Pete. Guest stars: Ahmed Best, Steve Blum, Alex Borstein, Ginger Gonzaga, Anders Holm, George Lowe, Kathy Najimy, Julianne Nicholson, Glen Powell, Tiya Sircar Note: This episode was the last to feature recurring voice actor George Lowe, who died on March 2, 2025.
196	16	"Gracie Purgatory in: That's How You Get Hemorrhoids"	Tom Sheppard	Mike Fasolo, Seth Green, Jared Gruszecki, Harmony McElligott, Michael Poisson, Matthew Senreich, Tom Sheppard and Ellory Smith	July 13, 2020	1017	0.42
Uber has a new ride share system and things get a little bumpy; Broadway will never be the same after Venom joins the cast of Hamilton; We learn what Squidward is up to after his role on SpongeBob SquarePants ends; Wakanda will never be the same after the Pink Panther challenges the Black Panther for the throne. Guest stars: Clark Duke, Tom Hopper, Anna Konkle, Whitney Loveall, Chris Pine, Ben Schwartz, Josh Robert Thompson, April Wahlin, Shannon Woodward Note: This episode was released one month prior to the death of Black Panther actor Chadwick Boseman.
197	17	"Sundancer Craig in: 30% of the Way to Crying"	Tom Sheppard	Mike Fasolo, Seth Green, Jared Gruszecki, Harmony McElligott, Michael Poisson, Matthew Senreich, Tom Sheppard and Ellory Smith	July 20, 2020	1018	0.54
Rita Repulsa finally figures out a way to take down the Power Rangers; The Robot Chicken crew reveals the monster from Bird Box; We get to see Freddy Krueger's worst nightmare; We get to see a different viewpoint from the movie Predator. Guest stars: Melissa Benoist, Abraham Benrubi, Mikey Day, Justin Hartley, Laura Marano, Olivia Olson, Stephen Root, Booboo Stewart, Maria Thayer, Gary Anthony Williams
198	18	"Callie Greenhouse in: Fun. Sad. Epic. Tragic."	Tom Sheppard	Nick Cron-DeVico, Mike Fasolo, Sasha Feiler, Seth Green, Jared Gruszecki, Michael McMillian, Breckin Meyer, Matthew Senreich and Tom Sheppard	July 20, 2020 (Note: Aired as an April Fools sneak peek on April 1, 2020)	1012	0.37
Batman's addition to his costume causes some concerns among the other superheroes; A ride-along with the Westeros P.D. reveals how they solve crimes; Bitch Pudding is placed on Love Island to see what kind of match she will find. Guest stars: Zazie Beetz, Alex Borstein, Madison Dylan, Nat Faxon, Nathan Fillion, Julia Garner, Jamie Kaler, Diane Kruger, Whitney Loveall, Katee Sackhoff Notes: This episode initially premiered as part of the Adult Swim April Fools' Day marathon before its official premiere on the broadcast night of July 19–20. The Love Island sketch with Bitch Pudding was pulled from the UK broadcasts on E4 due to Love Island host Caroline Flack's suicide.
199	19	"Babe Hollytree in: I Wish One Person Had Died"	Tom Sheppard	Mike Fasolo, Seth Green, Jared Gruszecki, Harmony McElligott, Michael Poisson, Matthew Senreich, Tom Sheppard and Ellory Smith	July 27, 2020	1019	0.40
The kids at Hogwarts get to see each others true fears; The RC gang puts a new twist on Old Yeller; The Pomsies have come to take over our world; We learn that Alexa never stops listening and that can only lead to one thing... the apocalypse! Guest stars: Mike Fasolo, Harmony McElligott, Matthew Mercer, Slushii, Alan Tudyk, Hynden Walch, Rei Ren, Sara Mostajabi, Carine Madsen
200	20	"Endgame"	Tom Sheppard	Mike Fasolo, Seth Green, Jared Gruszecki, Harmony McElligott, Michael Poisson, Matthew Senreich, Tom Sheppard and Ellory Smith	July 27, 2020	1020	0.38
To celebrate their 200th episode, Robot Chicken adds a choose-your-own-adventure gimmick to all of this episode's sketches, and the Nerd finds himself in his craziest adventure to date. After 10 seasons of research, we find out the reason for the Mad Scientist's experiments. Guest stars: Greg Berlanti, Mikey Day, Sam Elliott, Fabio Lanzoni, Anthony Head, Peyton List, David Lynch, Annie Parisse, The Weeknd
