= Robot Chicken season 9 =

Season 9 of Robot Chicken

Robot Chicken
- Season 9
- Cover art for digital downloads
- No. of episodes: 20

Release
- Original network: Adult Swim
- Original release: December 10, 2017 – July 22, 2018

Season chronology
- ← Previous; Season 8 Next → Season 10

The ninth season of the stop-motion television series Robot Chicken began airing in the United States on Cartoon Network's late night programming block, Adult Swim, on December 10, 2017, containing 20 episodes.

== Episodes ==
No. overall	No. in season	Title	Directed by	Written by	Original release date	Prod. code	US viewers (millions)
161	1	"Freshly Baked: The Robot Chicken Santa Claus Pot Cookie Freakout Special: Special Edition"	Tom Sheppard	Nick Cron-DeVico, Deirdre Devlin, Mike Fasolo, Seth Green, Tesha Kondrat, Matthew Senreich and Tom Sheppard	December 10, 2017	901	1.10
Robot Chicken joins Santa for a special Christmas he'll never forget; the North Pole elves dream of simple toys of holidays past; Krampus puts in a good word for the coal industry; and St. Nick finally meets his idol, Jared Leto. Guest stars: Jason Alexander, Jemaine Clement, Patrick Stump
162	2	"Hey I Found Another Sock!"	Tom Sheppard	Nick Cron-DeVico, Mike Fasolo, Shelby Fero, Seth Green, Matthew Senreich and Tom Sheppard	December 17, 2017	902	1.19
The Robot Chicken writers must take Fury Road to get into the office; a mature, mellowed-out Beavis is stalked by a very familiar and still immature blast from his past; the Homestar Runner gang start a militia and get gunned down; a young Kaiju sings a song about growing up, parodying Caillou; the Nerd visits Westworld to have sex with the robots. Guest stars: Ginger Gonzaga, Jim Hanks, Phil LaMarr, Katee Sackhoff, "Weird Al" Yankovic
163	3	"Scoot to the Gute"	Tom Sheppard	Nick Cron-DeVico, Mike Fasolo, Shelby Fero, Seth Green, Matthew Senreich and Tom Sheppard	January 7, 2018	903	1.15
Watch the Drama Llama perform on stage; An ordinary woman named Sara has an uncomfortable encounter with the Shopkins Shoppies; Doc McStuffins goes to the emergency room with her mom; various bugs land on Judy Hopps’ car; Daisy tries, unsuccessfully, to prove to Oswald that he can't drown in the ocean, all because he's just an octopus; investors are less than thrilled with the first generation of hosts from Westworld; the Scooby-Doo gang tell each other how they really feel, with dangerous results. Guest stars: Linda Cardellini, Shelby Fero, Sarah Michelle Gellar, Matthew Lillard, Freddie Prinze Jr., Fred Savage
164	4	"Things Look Bad for the Streepster"	Tom Sheppard	Nick Cron-DeVico, Mike Fasolo, Shelby Fero, Seth Green, Matthew Senreich and Tom Sheppard	January 14, 2018	904	1.14
The female Animal Crossing Villager joins "The Smashing Games"; Daniel Tiger is taught the toughest lesson of all; Lily from AT&T meets her new co-worker Bitch Pudding; the Nerd looks behind the curtain at Nick Arcade and hates it; body-switch wish movies get parodied on Switchamaf**k: The Movie; the musical Cats comes to people's homes; Edward Scissorhands, Freddy Krueger, and Wolverine hack an old lady's hedges; Jabberjaw goes on a much-needed vacation—to Amity Island. Guest stars: Ashley Holliday, Phil Moore, Eric Christian Olsen, Katee Sackhoff, Eden Sher
165	5	"Mr. Mozzarella's Hamburger Skateboard Depot"	Tom Sheppard	Nick Cron-DeVico, Mike Fasolo, Shelby Fero, Seth Green, Matthew Senreich and Tom Sheppard	January 21, 2018	905	1.14
Go inside Riley's mind as she gets new adult emotions in Inside Out 2; Captain Hook fakes a peanut allergy to kill Peter Pan; Jack Reacher is a telephone psychic; a kid suffers an allergic reaction to "peanuts" when Charlie Brown and his friends sit near him; two Oompa-Loompas are traumatized over what really goes on at Willy Wonka's chocolate factory; Joyce Byer's use of Christmas lights to communicate with her son causes a neighborhood war over who has the best Yuletide lawn decorations; a circus lion is released into the wild; a wedding proposal is ruined by a mariachi band, who are really the Stone Protectors in disguise (calling back to a sketch from last season's finale); the circus lion returns to hunt; the pig from the Black Mirror episode "The National Anthem" tells all to Howard Stern and becomes famous à la Kim Kardashian; the circus lion is now stuffed and mounted in a game hunter's trophy room; the movie Panic Room becomes a farce; and the Nerd forces his way through Star Wars: The Force Awakens. Guest stars: Bob Bergen, Rachael Leigh Cook, Nat Faxon, Keith Ferguson, Carla Gugino, Ross Marquand, Catherine Taber
166	6	"Strummy Strummy Sad Sad"	Tom Sheppard	Deirdre Devlin, Mike Fasolo, Seth Green, Kiel Kennedy, Matthew Senreich and Ellory Smith	January 28, 2018	906	1.19
Fred Flintstone runs for his life after dinosaurs start a revolution; Sebastian has union trouble with his orchestra; the MCU holds an intervention for Jessica Jones. Guest stars: Samaire Armstrong, Hugh Dancy, John DiMaggio, Isaiah Mustafa, Patton Oswalt, Jill Talley, Fred Tatasciore
167	7	"3 2 1 2 333, 222, 3...66?"	Tom Sheppard	Deirdre Devlin, Mike Fasolo, Seth Green, Kiel Kennedy, Matthew Senreich and Ellory Smith	February 4, 2018	907	1.17
Harriet the Spy is trying to fit into the modern world of cyberwarfare; Alvin and the Chipmunks play Coachella for the first and last time. Guest stars: Dane Cook, Tamara Garfield, Clare Grant, Howie Mandel, Justin Roiland, Michelle Trachtenberg Note: This episode was the last to feature recurring voice actor Michelle Trachtenberg, who died on February 26, 2025.
168	8	"We Don't See Much of That in 1940s America"	Tom Sheppard	Deirdre Devlin, Mike Fasolo, Seth Green, Kiel Kennedy, Matthew Senreich and Ellory Smith	February 11, 2018	908	1.00
Miss Frizzle goes to great lengths to survive after the Magic School Bus crashes in the mountains, even resorting to cannibalism; Harry Potter relives his golden years; Dominic Toretto gets fast and furious with the Titanic. Guest stars: Luke Evans, Milla Jovovich, Arielle Kebbel, Ally Maki
169	9	"Ext. Forest - Day"	Tom Sheppard	Deirdre Devlin, Mike Fasolo, Seth Green, Kiel Kennedy, Matthew Senreich and Ellory Smith	February 18, 2018	909	1.24
The writers can't get a grasp of Fight Club's rules; Zack Morris takes a time out with the Avengers; musings about whether old Rose's Titanic flashback was just a tall tale. Guest stars: Dan Fogler, Mark-Paul Gosselaar, Christina Hendricks, Taran Killam
170	10	"Factory Where Nuts Are Handled"	Tom Sheppard	Nick Cron-DeVico, Deirdre Devlin, Mike Fasolo, Seth Green, Tesha Kondrat, Matthew Senreich and Tom Sheppard	February 25, 2018	910	1.05
A sheared sheep gets shamed; Megatron nearly drowns a panda in lava, thinking it's a Maximal; a literal "Dumpster dive"; Michigan J. Frog meets his alt-right cousin, Pepe; the mummy from Monster in My Pocket becomes a Saturday Night Live host; Little Caesar's mascot gets stabbed in the back; existential crisis in a Legend of Zelda-style video game; the testing stage for Creepy-Crawlers; an Internet troll doll; Mickey Mouse plays The Dating Game; Wile E. Coyote teaches a college class about how to get away with murder; and the Olsen Twins get kidnapped in Mexico. Guest stars: Genevieve Angelson, Rachel Bloom, David Kaye, Victoria Justice, Martin Starr
171	11	"Never Forget"	Tom Sheppard	Nick Cron-DeVico, Deirdre Devlin, Mike Fasolo, Seth Green, Tesha Kondrat, Matthew Senreich and Tom Sheppard	May 20, 2018	911	1.08
The real reason why Indiana Jones hates snakes; Maxwell Lord discovers Supergirl's weakness; Date My Mom focuses on Jessica Rabbit. Guest stars: Fred Armisen, Felicia Day, Katie Holmes, Lori Petty
172	12	"Shall I Visit the Dinosaurs?"	Tom Sheppard	Nick Cron-DeVico, Deirdre Devlin, Mike Fasolo, Seth Green, Tesha Kondrat, Matthew Senreich and Tom Sheppard	May 27, 2018	912	1.00
God ghosts Margaret in a modern-day retelling of Judy Blume's iconic coming-of-age novel; Bonnie and Clyde get gunned down, but too many of the shots go to Clyde's groin; Santa Claus and Krampus star in the latest teen drama from The CW; turns out the stork delivering babies is not a myth; a multi-car pile-up in Busytown; Doctor Manhattan needles Laurie into confessing that she slept with Dan; James Bond meets an unfortunately-named man at the baccarat table; the Army now kills its enemies with kindness; remember to never forget the Great Furby Genocide of 1998 to 2000; Piccolo gets arrested for child abuse and endangerment; Magneto visits Auschwitz; the cast of Friends gets a lesson in lobster mating rituals; and Bitch Puddin' subs for Maria in this spoof of The Sound of Music. Guest stars: Sterling K. Brown, Brett Dalton, Betty Gilpin, Alyson Hannigan, Amy Ryan, Katee Sackhoff, Paul Wesley
173	13	"What Can You Tell Me About Butt Rashes?"	Tom Sheppard	Mike Fasolo, Seth Green, Kiel Kennedy, Michael Poisson, Matthew Senreich, Tom Sheppard and Ellory Smith	June 3, 2018	913	1.05
Hulk's leg doesn't transform with him; Tiny Tim gets new legs; a pimp furthers his prostitute's education and turns her into a Congresswoman to fight for equal pay; a barista meets He Who Shall Not Be Named; The Duke Boys' arguing over the Confederate Flag's controversial history turns into a PSA about distracted driving; The Wicked Witch of the West has some last-minute confessions; Richie Rich gets a lesson in capitalism; Mrs. Potts sings to Chip about why women go for brain-dead, abusive athletes; Jack and the Beanstalk gets a modern twist; The Terminator asks for too much when he arrives in the present; Glinda the Good Witch helps Ash win a Pokémon battle; a man doesn't understand office dress code; a squirrel is coerced into using an acorn as a suppository; Lt. Dan gets new legs, and Tiny Tim returns with his metal spider legs; the Sailor Scouts put up with a fat, out-of-shape man named Sailor Earth. Guest stars: Kristin Chenoweth, Eden Espinosa, Jim Hanks, Brenda Song
174	14	"Gimme That Chocolate Milk"	Tom Sheppard	Mike Fasolo, Seth Green, Kiel Kennedy, Michael Poisson, Matthew Senreich, Tom Sheppard and Ellory Smith	June 10, 2018	914	1.01
Captain Planet experiences the straw that breaks his back; J. Jonah Jameson has a secret involving Spider-Man; the Nerd learns that his problems involve putting his dick in a vacuum cleaner hose and Legion. Guest stars: Rachel Bloom, Elizabeth Gillies, Jason Isaacs, Parker Posey, J.K. Simmons, David Walton, Michaela Watkins
175	15	"Why Is It Wet?"	Tom Sheppard	Mike Fasolo, Seth Green, Kiel Kennedy, Michael Poisson, Matthew Senreich, Tom Sheppard and Ellory Smith	June 17, 2018	915	1.07
Mr. Monopoly from the Monopoly game tortures an adulterer with an iron; Mulan reveals her true identity; Dora the Explorer eats monkey brains in India; The Hot Wheels Connectors combine fast toy cars and their parents' failing marriages; Oscar the Grouch burns in a trash can fire; the Thimble from the Monopoly game gets fired and hits rock bottom; Your Mom is part of a clown car; Julia Child was skilled in cooking and killing zombies; three unicorn POGs get hit on by a slammer POG; Jareth from Labyrinth is the world's worst Hot Topic clerk; Snapchat filters and serious messages from Batman don't mix; Tarzan has a vine swinging accident; Charon reluctantly takes a man's Visa card as payment for riding down the River Styx; Mr. Bubble is in court for lewd conduct with minors; Toilet Jaws: Just When You Thought It Was Safe to Go to the Bathroom; the government agents from E.T. finally shoot down Elliot and his friends as they escape; and Rita Repulsa from Mighty Morphin' Power Rangers uses her magic wand for male enhancement. Guest stars: Alex Borstein, Sean Gunn, Alfred Molina, Randall Park, Maria Thayer
176	16	"Jew No. 1 Opens a Treasure Chest"	Tom Sheppard	Mike Fasolo, Seth Green, Kiel Kennedy, Michael Poisson, Matthew Senreich, Tom Sheppard and Ellory Smith	June 24, 2018	916	1.03
A Scooby-Doo villain realizes the absurdity of his plan; Super Grover's secret identity is revealed; Calvin from Calvin and Hobbes is all grown up but Hobbes wants no part of it. Guest stars: Genevieve Angelson, Kylie Bunbury, Alice Eve, Matthew Lillard, Anndi McAfee
177	17	"He's Not Even Aiming at the Toilet"	Tom Sheppard	Hugh Davidson, Mike Fasolo, Seth Green, Michael Poisson, Matthew Senreich, Mehar Sethi, Tom Sheppard and Erik Weiner	July 1, 2018	917	0.98
Galen Erso helped close all the plot holes in Rogue One; Peppa Pig and her family deal with Brexit fallout; a knock-off of Hamilton: An American Musical. Guest stars: Abraham Benrubi, Hugh Davidson, Sherilyn Fenn, Keith Ferguson, Alfred Molina, Meredith Salenger, Serinda Swan, Milana Vayntrub, Erik Weiner
178	18	"Your Mouth Is Hanging off Your Face"	Tom Sheppard and Alex Kamer	Mike Fasolo, Seth Green, Michael Poisson, Matthew Senreich, Mehar Sethi, Tom Sheppard and Erik Weiner	July 8, 2018	918	0.90
Michelangelo from the Teenage Mutant Ninja Turtles seduces a pizza boy; a catfish gets catfished on MTV's Human; Jesus confronts the Easter Bunny about corrupting the true meaning of Easter; The Unsinkable Molly Brown gets a new, embarrassing nickname after being rescued from King Kong's anus; a send-up of the cult horror film It Follows where a mom stalks four gal pals on social media; frat boys moon a driver who turns into a werewolf; a van-driving pervert is lured into a kid's toy car; a magician's card trick fails; a TV cook gets gunned down by a chick hatched from an egg; Smurfs try to buy Sudafed for meth; The Swedish Chef from The Muppets can't get past airport security; a bird is tricked into thinking a mole's penis is a worm; Ziggy gets cloned; an insect strip club gets "Raid"-ed; Swiper from Dora the Explorer becomes the newest Fox News pundit; Geppetto wants the Blue Fairy to bring his sex doll to life; RoboCop becomes a security guard at a pharmacy and the Smurfs come back for more Sudafed; and ALF reveals his musical past. Guest stars: Jon Cryer, Mikey Day, Laura Ortiz, Betsy Russell, Rhea Seehorn, Kate Upton
179	19	"No Wait, He Has a Cane"	Tom Sheppard	Mike Fasolo, Seth Green, Michael Poisson, Matthew Senreich, Mehar Sethi, Tom Sheppard and Erik Weiner	July 15, 2018	919	0.97
The Devil and Jesus Christ think office workers are talking about them; Two-Face loses in a coin toss; a parody of The Ring is an excuse for Tom Sheppard to do his Ringo Starr impression; a violin gets caught playing with itself; Mr. Sinister is the latest fashion victim on TLC's What Not to Wear; cake hunters get attacked; Jon Snow faces a great threat in Westeros: White Joggers; a little girl learns why you shouldn't put all your eggs in one basket; a heptapod alien from the movie Arrival is a contestant on the game show Pictionary; The Joker does stand-up comedy; teen girls in a carpool can't stand Bob Dylan's music; and Grizzlor becomes He-Man's pubic wig. Guest stars: Tom Sheppard, Bryan Cranston, Mamie Gummer, Dan Milano, Alisha Boe, Katherine Langford
180	20	"Hi."	Tom Sheppard	Mike Fasolo, Seth Green, Michael Poisson, Matthew Senreich, Mehar Sethi, Tom Sheppard and Erik Weiner	July 22, 2018	920	1.05
The season ends with Jean-Claude Van Damme getting hit in the groin by giraffes; a Funko re-enactment of Saddam Hussein's execution; the greatest Japanese commercial of all time; a mash-up of Taken and You Can't Do That on Television; Jiminy Cricket visits an 18-year-old Pinocchio; Eleven from Stranger Things becomes a school bully; a drunk woman named Cindy thinks she's Wonder Woman; Donald Trump acts like Veruca Salt in a parody of Charlie and the Chocolate Factory; Frankenstein's monster pees at a urinal; and Adult Swim president Mike Lazzo promises to renew Robot Chicken if one of their recurring characters can jump the Grand Canyon. Guest stars: Nichole Bloom, Rachael Leigh Cook, Clark Duke, Pete Gardner, Ralph Garman, Michaela Watkins
