= Robot Chicken season 8 =

Robot Chicken
- Season 8
- Cover art for digital downloads
- No. of episodes: 20

Release
- Original network: Adult Swim
- Original release: October 25, 2015 – May 15, 2016

Season chronology
- ← Previous; Season 7 Next → Season 9

The eighth season of the stop-motion television series Robot Chicken began airing in the United States on Cartoon Network's late night programming block, Adult Swim, on October 18, 2015, (Note: Adult Swim lists the show's eighth season as premiering on October 25, 2015 at 12:00 a.m. (24:00) EST/PST, which is effectively October 26.) with the episode Robot Chicken DC Comics Special III: Magical Friendship, and contained a total of 20 episodes.

== Episodes ==
No. overall	No. in season	Title	Directed by	Written by	Original release date	Prod. code	US viewers (millions)
141	1	"Garbage Sushi"	Tom Sheppard	Mike Fasolo, Seth Green, Matthew Senreich, Mehar Sethi, Tom Sheppard & Brian Wysol	October 25, 2015	801	1.17
Godzilla and Jason Voorhees face off in the year 2023; Jesus and his disciples advertise the breakfast cereal Holy-Os; a turtle on a standoff with police after robbing a bank hides in his shell whenever they fire their weapons and is finally killed by a grenade; Handy Manny is deported after a tip from Bob the Builder; a mixup with a Magic Grow dinosaur and Grandma's heart medicine leads to disastrous consequences; a commercial for Chew Blast Gum encouraging throwing it at old people with a slingshot; Captain Planet is promoted to general, and is bogged down with paperwork; Nicki Minaj's sister Nicki Mortgage offers to refinance her producers' homes; a Cylon's surprise birthday party; song parody of Dinosaur Train; Mr. Magoo inadvertently takes on the Yakuza and easily takes them out with a sword, and is horrified at his actions upon looking through an eye glass; Thanos acquires the Infinity Gauntlet and remarks he finally has something to go with his wardrobe; odd mating rituals of mermaids; The Little Match Girl goes mad with power. Guest stars: Thomas Lennon, Freddie Prinze Jr., George Takei, Rob Paulsen, Rachel Bloom, Minae Noji, Joe Hanna
142	2	"Ants on a Hamburger"	Tom Sheppard	Mike Fasolo, Seth Green, Matthew Senreich, Mehar Sethi, Tom Sheppard & Brian Wysol	November 1, 2015	802	1.04
The cast of Aaahh!!! Real Monsters have a meeting about the best ways to scare people with the scary little girl from The Ring; The Hulk calls to complain about charges to his cable bill; a husband becomes possessed by a spider and proceeds to urinate and twerk; The Grizzly Man is mauled by three bears he dresses as humans; a dark chapter of American history gets some levity in Twelve Years a Clown; the ghost girl from The Ring has her cursed videotape transferred to DVD; Goofy is diagnosed with autism; Fonzie takes on a horde of zombies; a perverted bar of soap; an American colonist sells his bell for two bucks; two teenagers watching cat videos online run afoul of the scary little girl from The Ring, who sends a cat through the screen to kill them; The Nerd dreams about being in CW shows. Guest stars: Tom Cavanagh, Ashley Holliday, Ken Jeong, Kristin Kreuk, Josh Robert Thompson
143	3	"Zeb and Kevin Erotic Hot Tub Canvas"	Tom Sheppard	Mike Fasolo, Seth Green, Matthew Senreich, Mehar Sethi, Tom Sheppard & Brian Wysol	November 8, 2015	803	1.14
When Pluto is not invited to the "Planet Party", his fellow dwarf planets Eris and Ceres insist they throw a party of their own, with the other planets eventually letting Pluto back into the fold, with the promise of sexual favors; a constipated Samantha Stephens; Pickle Joe, who has been ruining sketches since 1865, strikes again when he replaces jars of jam from a simple sketch with jars of his semen; police mistake loud screaming from Pee-wee's Playhouse as a hostage situation; Simon plays a sleazy game of Simon Sez; Adam Richman's toilet runs away; Prince showers in purple rain, which turns out to be transmission fluid; Seth and Matt present sketches of shows they have never seen, including The Good Wife, Highway to Heaven, and Deadwood; the Joker shows his respect for Ronald McDonald; a mother tries to find an American Girl doll that looks just like her spoiled daughter; Dr. Smith wonders why the Robot never mentions him in his warnings, leading the Robot to imply Smith is a child molester; Steve Aoki is recruited to play Major League Baseball for the Los Angeles Dodgers; the Agents of S.H.I.E.L.D. are in dire need of a hero; The Wild Thornberrys ramp up the content of their nature documentaries so they can stay relevant on cable TV. Guest stars: Steve Aoki, Lacey Chabert, Jodi Carlisle, Danielle Harris, Timothy Omundson, Will Sasso
144	4	"Cheese Puff Mountain"	Tom Sheppard	Mike Fasolo, Seth Green, Matthew Senreich, Mehar Sethi, Tom Sheppard & Brian Wysol	November 15, 2015	804	1.22
Goliath from Gargoyles turns to stone and gets covered in pigeon droppings; Todd sends a dick pic to Stacy; a husband and wife surprise each other; a haberdasher's hands are bleeding out due to Oddjob's hat; Godzilla destroys a city with a shark stuck in its groin; Doctor Manhattan raves with three women; KITT gets carjacked and Michael Knight gets inside Lightning McQueen from Cars; a passenger aboard an airplane piloted by Mr. Peanut has a peanut allergy; Douglas Quaid from Total Recall gets really grossed out by Kuato; a shark with a knife adapts to the human environment; two T-Rexes fight with their short arms; Peter Pan chooses Stinker Bell over Tinker Bell; the Paw Patrol must rescue animals from two burning treehouses; the Scooby-Doo gang observe the abundance of abandoned places in their area; Gul Madred captures and tortures a naked Picard in a game show; Yakko Warner from Animaniacs sings all about the Kama Sutra. Guest stars: Erin Cottrell, Brett Dalton, Alexis Denisof, Patrick Stewart
145	5	"Cake Pillow"	Tom Sheppard	Mike Fasolo, Shelby Fero, Seth Green, Joel Hurwitz, Matthew Senreich & Tom Sheppard	November 22, 2015	805	1.07
Ghostwriter's demand for sex is misconstrued as a clue about a backpack thief (three-part sketch); the Dream Phone game now includes an obscene phone caller; The Magic School Bus goes on one final trip; The Transformers get a new member: Jeffrey Tambor from Transparent; The Teletubbies watch porn when the sun goes down; Planet of the Apes's twist ending gets another twist; The Wonder Pets send a calf to slaughter; a dad gets threatened by a monster in his son's bedroom closet; the MTV teen comedy Awkward is now a home board game; Veruca Salt gets an Oompa-Loompa; the history behind an Indian burial ground; a sea creature pees on two swimmers' stuff; the Bananas in Pajamas get shocking news from the doctor; the teens from Archie Comics appear on Are You The One? Guest stars: Fred Armisen, Arielle Kebbel, Will Kirby, Ryan Phillippe, Ashley Rickards, Ming-Na Wen
146	6	"Zero Vegetables"	Tom Sheppard	Mike Fasolo, Shelby Fero, Seth Green, Joel Hurwitz, Matthew Senreich & Tom Sheppard	December 6, 2015	806	1.11
A little girl's Skip-It turns into a deadly weapon; Anastasia Steele enters an S&M relationship with Uncle Pennybags from the Monopoly board game; a truncated version of the movie Footloose; Mrs. Butterworth gets inappropriate; a naked Michael Bay defends his latest sequel for Transformers; Quint from Jaws complains of a "shark BJ"; a Nazi officer's sandwich goes missing and Adolf Hitler may have taken it; a member of the Midnight Society from Are You Afraid of the Dark? gets criticized for not following the rules of titling the stories; King Kong's captors forget to take him to the bathroom and Kong ends up flooding the audience with his urine; in 1692, Bitch Pudding testifies during the Salem Witch Trials in a send-up of The Crucible. Guest stars: Eric André, Chris Diamantopoulos, Jermaine Fowler, Martin Freeman, Karen Gillan, Lee Pace, Katee Sackhoff
147	7	"The Robot Chicken Christmas Special: The X-Mas United"	Tom Sheppard	Mike Fasolo, Shelby Fero, Seth Green, Joel Hurwitz, Matthew Senreich & Tom Sheppard	December 13, 2015	807	1.24
In this special Christmas episode, The Robot Chicken Nerd finds out his real father is Santa Claus and tries to find him on Christmas Eve. Guest stars: Jim Hanks, Scott Porter, Michaela Watkins, Henry Winkler, James Wolk
148	8	"Joel Hurwitz"	Tom Sheppard	Mike Fasolo, Shelby Fero, Seth Green, Joel Hurwitz, Matthew Senreich & Tom Sheppard	January 3, 2016	808	1.25
Sexual tension between a pair of paratroopers; Barbie and Ken rescue Skipper from being a reluctant contestant on Bone Bus; pollination gets X-rated; while visiting Foster's Home for Imaginary Friends, a little girl picks Tyler Durden from Fight Club; salmons come to Spawn in a river; Wolverine and Jean Grey appear on a reality TV show about ex-lovers living together; God joins Riddick in blasting aliens; all crime -- even inconsequential crimes -- get committed during The Purge (two-part sketch); a Minecraft sheep gets seduced; Pinocchio's life as a real boy is woefully short-lived; how the last unicorn came to be; a swamp monster is "Hot for Teacher"; mimes rob a bank; Predator gets filtered through the ABC reality show The Bachelor. Guest stars: Johnny Devenanzio, Luke Evans, Famke Janssen, T. J. Lavin, Jennette McCurdy, Sarah Rice
149	9	"Blackout Window Heat Stroke"	Tom Sheppard	Deirdre Devlin, Jeff Eckman, Mike Fasolo, Seth Green, J.T. Krul & Matthew Senreich	January 10, 2016	809	1.26
Bitch Pudding solves crimes; an apple in a vending machine wants to die; a look at why there are brown M&Ms; Dynasty featuring actual ducks and Joan Collins; a dog nun-chucks a stranger; Falcon Crest with real falcons; The Kool-Aid Man is forced to serve drinks to a suicide cult; Knots Landing featuring garlic knots and Don Knotts; Willy Wonka gives his chocolate factory to Charlie -- and sets him up to be indicted in court; Ickis from Aaahh!!! Real Monsters gets rejected from Monsters University; The Lone Ranger refuses to fight the injustice of the white man taking Tonto's land; jellyfish at a bar; The Perverted Unicorn helps a jockey win a horse race. Guest stars: Ernie Hudson, Katee Sackhoff, Courtney Thorne-Smith, Tom Kenny
150	10	"The Unnamed One"	Tom Sheppard	Deirdre Devlin, Jeff Eckman, Mike Fasolo, Seth Green, J.T. Krul, Matthew Senreich & Tom Sheppard	January 17, 2016	810	1.57
The Robot Chicken scientist gets his cable cut off, then reinstated as part of the show's 150th episode milestone; Mike from The Blair Witch Project is found standing in the corner to relieve himself; an old lady has trouble picking out a raccoon in a police line-up; Family Double Dare airs a special edition featuring infidelity; Gonzo and his chicken find out if they're going to be parents; Oprah Winfrey welcomes Cthulhu on an episode of her talk show; Galactus auditions new heralds; nut taps at a funeral; Robin the Boy Wonder uses the Batmobile as a Lyft vehicle; a woman goes off the wagon after tasting a Thin Mint Girl Scout cookie; a man wants to have sex with a dinosaur on an episode of Fantasy Island; a man sleeps with a Game Genie and gets caught by a classic Nintendo console; Leonidas and his Spartan Army literally dine in Hell; an awkward teenage boy looking to make his move imagines himself on a sexual version of Nickelodeon GUTS; a school assembly featuring rapping broccoli and Carrot Top; Aladdin and Jasmine have sex; a superhero team of mice get attacked by a cat. Guest stars: Bob Saget, Marc Summers, Carrot Top
151	11	"Fridge Smell"	Tom Sheppard	Deirdre Devlin, Jeff Eckman, Mike Fasolo, Seth Green, J.T. Krul & Matthew Senreich	March 13, 2016	811	1.23
Paul Edgecomb escorts John Coffey down the Green Mile, but has to go back when he forgets his keys (running joke throughout episode); The Dementors from Harry Potter go on strike for longer lunch hours; Kel Kimble from Kenan & Kel comforts his half-boy, half-orange soda son; two kids imagine which "Ranger" character from pop culture could win in a fight; a possessed child is given a time-out for disrupting dinner; Skylanders: Trap Team learn a different meaning of the word trap; Oskar Schindler has a grocery list and the customer behind him realizes he's in a Robot Chicken sketch; Optimus Prime goes to jury duty; Princess Zelda from the Legend of Zelda games farts in bed; Master Splinter gives the Teenage Mutant Ninja Turtles the sex talk; a neutered dog gets a change in personality; two teens trying to cover up a crime get attacked by a haunted moped; John Coffey finally gets sent to the electric chair -- and gets a surprise when Edgecomb pulls the lever. Guest stars: Alison Haislip, Jim Hanks, Caity Lotz, Kel Mitchell
152	12	"Western Hay Batch"	Tom Sheppard	Deirdre Devlin, Jeff Eckman, Mike Fasolo, Seth Green, J.T. Krul & Matthew Senreich	March 20, 2016	812	1.32
An elderly couple get stuck in the anus of a monster that the Power Rangers are fighting; Speed Racer's car is not as fast as he thinks it is; God is outraged when the creator of Minecraft claims he has more money than Him; Obi-Wan Kenobi takes the high road while fighting Anakin Skywalker; insurance salesman at a talent show; Bigfoot becomes a porn star; Mr. Bill gets his revenge on Sluggo and Mr. Hands; Kermit from Muppet Babies gets killed acting out the climax of King Kong; The Grim Reaper gets his robe stolen; Mikey from Nick Arcade gets blown up; Dracula visits a doctor; two kids find Winnie the Pooh in the woods; what goes on in a doppel-gangbang; The Terminator stops Eve from partaking of the forbidden fruit in the Garden of Eden. Guest stars: Anna Chlumsky, Zac Efron, Phil Moore, Tiffany Shepis
153	13	"Triple Hot Dog Sandwich on Wheat"	Tom Sheppard	Deirdre Devlin, Mike Fasolo, Seth Green, Joel Hurwitz, Jason Reich, & Matthew Senreich	March 27, 2016	813	1.36
Orcas are used as clay pigeons in skeet shooting; a ghost's Michael Jackson impression is in bad taste; Jon Snow calls upon The Kiss Army; Baby Alive has a flatulence problem; illegal aliens; Lex Luthor searches for a house on Property Brothers; a couple being held hostage use sex as Morse code; a My Little Pony's cutie mark is treated like a tramp stamp tattoo; the lost Eleventh Commandment; a look at what smoking has done to your favorite classic cartoon characters like the Caterpillar from Disney's Alice in Wonderland, Fred Flintstone, The Pink Panther, and Olive Oyl; Abraham Lincoln's last moments; Connor the smoke monster plays a song; Inspector Gadget gets turned into a drone; a giraffe dressed as Sherlock Holmes forgets his lines; a Bumble's checks have bounced; Goldilocks has an affair with Papa Bear. Guest stars: Dave Coulier, Alfred Molina, Carice van Houten, Cree Summer, Tara Strong
154	14	"Joel Hurwitz Returns"	Tom Sheppard	Deirdre Devlin, Mike Fasolo, Seth Green, Joel Hurwitz, Jason Reich, & Matthew Senreich	April 3, 2016	814	1.14
The Humping Robot nearly kills an innocent man to assuage his fetish for handjobs; there's nothing at the Air and Space Museum; Daredevil isn't the only one with powers based on losing one of his senses; James Bond plays the board game Mastermind; zebras get high; a Simon champion aces his job at Taco Bell; Snake is stuck on the toilet on Metal Gear Solid; a rejected sketch involving tater tots; the beeping in a hospital room is not from a dying man's heart monitor; one of the Popples has a foul mouth; the king's horses and the king's men can't put Humpty-Dumpty together again; a disgusting take on The Sisterhood of the Traveling Pants; a religious strip club; the "five little monkeys" nursery rhyme gets a realistic ending; the Micronauts get a new transportation system. Guest stars: Emilia Clarke, Alexandra Daddario, Hugh Dancy, Jared Harris, Adrianne Palicki
155	15	"Hopefully Salt"	Tom Sheppard	Deirdre Devlin, Mike Fasolo, Seth Green, Joel Hurwitz, Jason Reich, & Matthew Senreich	April 10, 2016	815	1.61
Mortal Kombat's fighting gets sissified; a polar bear sneaks into Superman's Fortress of Solitude and gains his powers; a wolf in sheep's clothing has an identity crisis; crabs jump-roping; Game & Watch firemen rescue people from a burning building; Scrooge McDuck swims in his gold coins and gets attacked by a money shark; The Nerd has a near-death experience; an adult wins on Are You Smarter Than a Fifth Grader; Link unhooks Princess Zelda's bra; Clarice Starling remembers what the lambs were screaming about in a Silence of the Lambs parody; a guy's mind is blown after he complains about Dr. Pepper; Barbie fakes her death and Ken is accused of murdering her; Stephen Hawking hawks Cinnamon Toast Crunch; The Teenage Mutant Ninja Turtles get military-grade weaponry. Guest stars: Keegan-Michael Key, Tatiana Maslany, Dax Shepard, Alan Tudyk
156	16	"Yogurt in a Bag"	Tom Sheppard	Deirdre Devlin, Mike Fasolo, Seth Green, Joel Hurwitz, Jason Reich, & Matthew Senreich	April 17, 2016	816	1.33
A miserable stripper at a donkey show imagines life frolicking with a My Little Pony in Equestria; Slash lays down some guitar licks and so does the rabbit he pulls out of his hat; the pedestrians in a "Pedestrians Crossing" sign get hit; Liam Neeson's movie seat gets "taken"; Evel Knievel goes on one last bike ride; a Frenchwoman waits for her guillotined husband to respond to her; Polly Pocket and her friends get boarded by Somali pirates; an old man hits on an older woman at the bar; Waffle Face the gangster tells the story of how he got his name; a geek solves a Rubik's Cube; Zoltar the Fortune-Telling Machine is a pervert; Doug (from the Nickelodeon/Disney cartoon of the same name) becomes a horrible stand-up comic; Buffalo Bill from Silence of the Lambs uses Tinder; The Radcliffes get rid of their 101 Dalmatians after the doctor tells them they're prone to incest and pedophilia; The Crypt-Keeper sues the Monster High girls for stealing his schtick of making morbid puns. Guest stars: Ralph Garman, Jamie and Joey King, Jane Krakowski, Rumer Willis, Billy West
157	17	"Secret of the Flushed Footlong"	Tom Sheppard	Mikey Day, Mike Fasolo, Shelby Fero, Seth Green, Matthew Senreich, Mehar Sethi & Erik Weiner	April 24, 2016	817	1.42
Angela Lansbury stars in an updated version of Murder She Wrote; a shampoo bottle sings about being rubbed into a man's hair and balls; Seth Green tells the story of how he got sick during a filming of a Burger King commercial when he was a child; the American Girl dolls have a tea party that gets awkward when Addy Walker reveals that she grew up during slavery times; Krang from Teenage Mutant Ninja Turtles creeps out his blind date; KITT from Night Rider is abused; The opening theme to The Brady Bunch gets a shocking extended version explaining what happened to Carol's first husband; a carpenter ant makes the ultimate sacrifice for insect-kind; a mummy wants to know where his penis is; a collection of Will Smith's rejected action one-liners from Independence Day; Waldo from the Where's Waldo books get a text message; The toys from Toy Story meet a condescending, overly-PC toy from Gwyneth Paltrow's Goop website; Americans and Muslim terrorists finally bond when both of them reveal their hatred for Adobe Reader Update; The Brave Little Toaster tries to toast an everything bagel; Huey Lewis presents a rejected song from the first Back to the Future movie. Guest stars: Jordana Brewster, Jennie Garth, Jim Hanks, John Krasinski, Patrick Stump
158	18	"Food"	Tom Sheppard	Mikey Day, Mike Fasolo, Shelby Fero, Seth Green, Matthew Senreich, Mehar Sethi & Erik Weiner	May 1, 2016	818	1.41
Walter White from Breaking Bad breaks it down with a rap that gets upstaged by his crippled son; Kaz's EXO suit gets flooded with diarrhea; Swiper from Dora the Explorer stars in an American Sniper parody; Max Action is accused of being on cocaine; a poisonous snake helps a hapless guy get some action from Charlie's Angels; three bank robbers become contestants on the mobile game show Cash Cab; James Bond orders something different at the bar; grasshoppers brag about having sex; an interrogation scene is spoken in nursery rhyme; Marlon Brando eats butter instead of using it sexually in a parody of Last Tango in Paris; The Chupacabra raps about being the G.O.A.T. (Greatest of All Time); Remy the rat from Ratatouille helps Linguini with his sex life; a kangaroo is busted on shoplifting charges; Crystar breaks when the fat lady at an opera sings; Bigfoot becomes a monster truck-driving police officer. Guest stars: Bryan Cranston, Anna Gunn, Tricia Helfer, Hulk Hogan, RJ Mitte
159	19	"Not Enough Women"	Tom Sheppard	Mikey Day, Mike Fasolo, Shelby Fero, Seth Green, Matthew Senreich, Mehar Sethi & Erik Weiner	May 8, 2016	819	1.35
Dora the Explorer and Boots get cornered by real gorillas; Tupac, Biggie Smalls, and Aaliyah get raised from the dead for a Suge Knight track; Darth Vader learns how to say sorry after realizing Princess Leia is his daughter; Jurassic Park gets a new name; Willy Wonka can't get the main door to his chocolate factory open; a murder mystery party gets sidetracked by a man who tells others of a sex gig he landed on Craigslist; Bugs Bunny's drag act leads to transsexuality; the Terminator changes the future by staying in the past; David Copperfield auditions for Magic Mike; eels playing steel drums; Eagle Force change their name after their mascot dies; Soundwave relaxes; an obscene Hobbit limerick; Edna Mode from The Incredibles competes on Project Runway. Guest stars: Laura Ortiz, Adrianne Palicki
160	20	"The Angelic Sounds of Mike Giggling"	Tom Sheppard	Mikey Day, Mike Fasolo, Shelby Fero, Seth Green, Matthew Senreich, Mehar Sethi & Erik Weiner	May 15, 2016	820	1.29
A perverted coconut tree; Screw Head from GoBots leads a surprise attack on the Guardians' base; a crime scene of Lois Lane's murder; Max Black and Caroline Channing from 2 Broke Girls cause natural disasters; the Stone Protectors perform at a wedding; Katie Hall presents her report on Abigail Adams at San Dimas High School; Batman couldn't care less whether or not Superman bleeds; Elliott and E.T. make a reaction video on Vine to "When your crush texts you back!"; Doug Goldstein decides the season eight finale. Guest stars: Christie Brinkley, Shelby Fero, Brittany Furlan
