= Krampus: The Devil Returns =

- Official release poster
- Directed by: Jason Hull
- Written by: Jason Hull; A.J. Leslie
- Produced by: Steve Dorth; A.J. Leslie; Darin Foltz
- Starring: A.J. Leslie; R.A. Mihailoff; Melantha Blackthorne; Paul Ferm
- Cinematography: Mike Berlin; Eric Koval; Arturo Rivera
- Production company: Snow Dog Studio
- Distributed by: ITN Distribution
- Release date: October 4, 2016
- Running time: 83 Minutes
- Country: United States
- Language: English

Krampus: The Devil Returns (also known as Krampus 2: The Devil Returns) is a 2016 American horror film that was written and directed by Jason Hull. The film is a sequel to the 2013 film from Hull titled Krampus: The Christmas Devil and stars A.J. Leslie, Melantha Blackthorn, R.A. Mihailoff and Paul Ferm. The film was produced under the Snow Dog Studio banner and distributed worldwide by ITN Distribution with a release date of October 4, 2016.

== Plot ==
Unable to solve the onslaught of missing children in their town, Police Officers Dave Kane and Paul Sharp lure former officer Jeremy Duffin out of his self imposed exile following the murder of his wife and the abduction of his daughter at the hands of Krampus. After much debate and with the hopes of finding his daughter, Duffin reluctantly agrees to track the monster and is accompanied by his hulking woodsman friend Monk. Once back to civilization, Duffin, Monk, Kane, and Sharp are joined by cops Gil Farabee, Harry Sharp and Lori Taylor. The quest to find Krampus and the children is further complicated by run-ins with tough guy Stuart and his gang consisting of Natasha, T.J., Trevor and Rick....along with a nasty Santa Claus.

== Cast ==
- A.J. Leslie as Jeremy Duffin
- Melantha Blackthorne as Natashia
- R.A. Mihailoff as Stuart
- Tiffani Fest as Lori Taylor
- Richard Goteri as Gil Farabee
- Michael Mili as Harry Sharp
- Paul Ferm as Santa Clause
- Darin Foltz as Dave Kane
- Johnny Stevenson as Monk
- Darren Barcomb as Paul Sharp
- Bill Kennedy as T.J.
- Daniel James as Trevor
- Robbie Barnes as Amy Baker
- Arturo Rivera as Rick
- Shawn C. Phillips as Rob Sanderson
- Jason Hull as Neighbor Bill
- Will Barrett as Post Office Worker
- Ben Berlin as Krampus

== Production ==
The film was completed in Erie, Pennsylvania and Edinboro, Pennsylvania in the winter months of 2016.

== Reception ==
Krampus 2: The Devil Returns received mixed reviews from notable horror web-sites and platforms. Culturecrypt.com gave the film zero stars, stating that "Anyone on your naughty list should be forced to watch this execrable excuse for a movie." Morehorror.com reviewed the film favorably though, with Jesse Miller writing that "I rather enjoyed my time with Krampus 2 and I believe it's because it knows exactly what it is – a low budget hybrid beast of ideas that all seem to gel together to create a feature that goes down smashingly." Ben Spurling of Horrornews.net chimed in with "The script, as in most micro-budget horror movies, is a bit muddled and isn't clarified any by sluggish direction and listless editing. There are a few twists thrown in, one rather surprising and distasteful, and a couple of almost adequate scenes of the police skulking through falling snow in search of their prey; but still, the final completed product is strictly small change and only for the Killer Christmas completest." The-other-view.com also gave the film a mixed review but said this of the twist ending: "With any bad film, especially one with a "twist", I'd have spoiled it without as much as a care. However, I'll jump the gun and say that with "Krampus: The Devil Returns", it needs to be seen to be believed, especially if you're aware of the events from the first film. I honestly did not see that one coming!"

== Awards ==
Krampus 2: The Devil Returns took home awards for Best Feature Film, Best Director (Jason Hull) and Best Supporting Actress in a Feature Film (Melantha Blackthorne) at the 2016 FANtastic Horror Film Festival in San Diego, California.

The film also placed third in the category of Feature Horror Films at the 2017 Indie Gathering International Film Festival.
