= Candid photography =

Photograph captured without creating a posed appearance

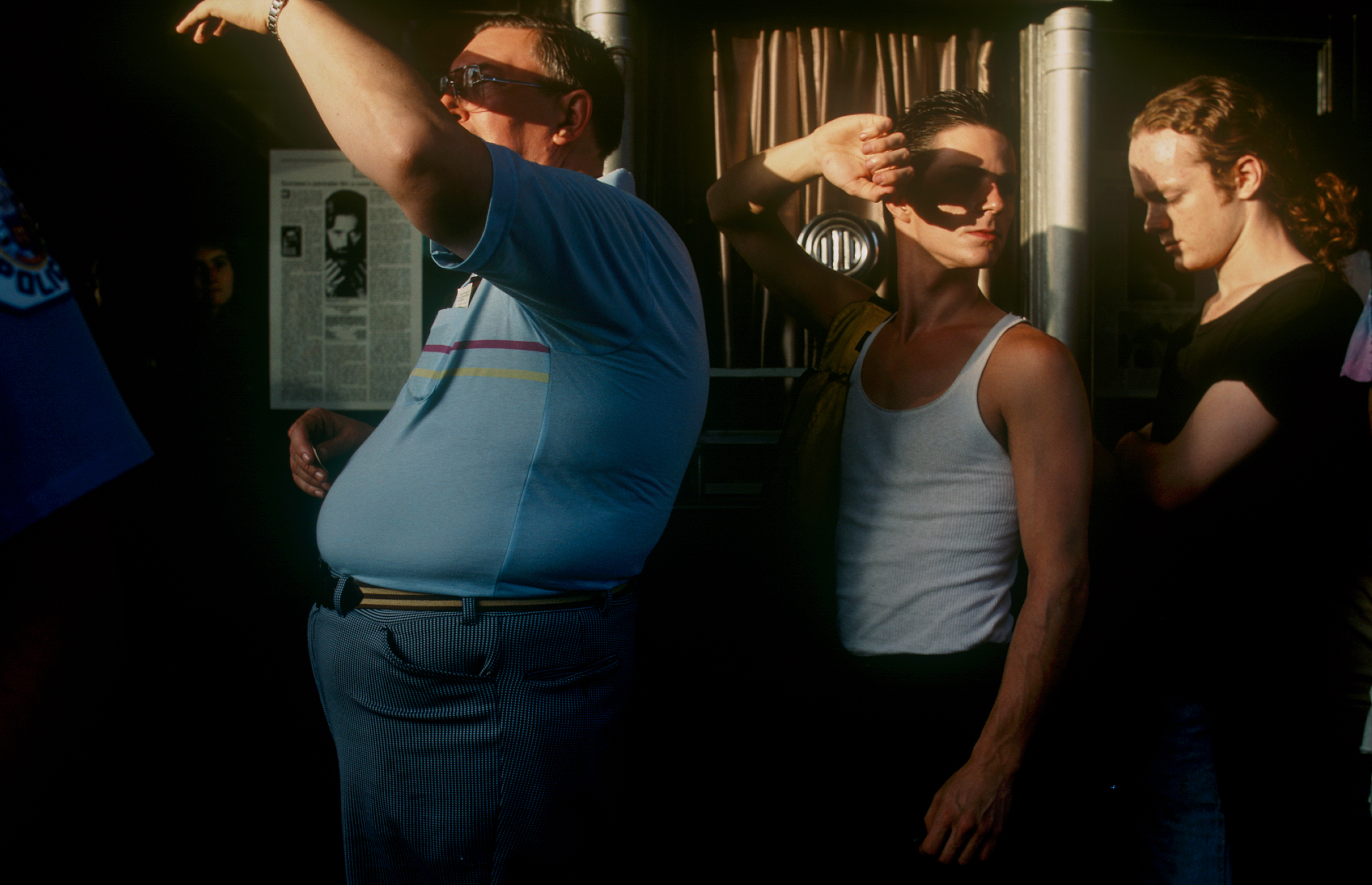
A candid photograph, made in Chicago in 1988

Candid photography, also called spontaneous photography or snap shooting, is photography captured without creating a posed appearance. Candid photography captures natural expressions and moments that might not be possible to reproduce in a studio or posed photo shoot. This style of photography is most often used to capture people in their natural state without them noticing the camera. The main focus is on capturing the candid expressions and moments of life. Candid photography is often seen as a more honest representation of the subject than posed photography.

Candid shot of a college student in 1979.

Candid photography can be used to capture a wide variety of subjects and occasions. It is a popular style of photography for street photography, wedding photography, portrait photography, and event photography. It can be used to capture candid moments of life, such as people walking on the street or in other public places such as parks and beaches, children playing, or family gatherings. It can also be used to capture moments of joy and celebration. Candid photography is also used in photojournalism and documentary photography.

To capture candid photos, the photographer may need to observe the subject from a distance or use a long lens or telephoto zoom lens. This allows for capturing the subject in their natural environment without them being aware of the camera. The photographer may need to be quick and have an eye for interesting compositions and backgrounds.

A candid photograph is a photograph captured without creating a posed appearance. The candid nature of a photograph is unrelated to the subject's knowledge about or consent to the fact that photographs are being taken, and are unrelated to the subject's permission for further usage and distribution. The crucial factor is the actual absence of posing. However, if the intent is that the subject is absolutely unaware of being photographed and does not even expect it, such photography is secret photography, which is an extreme case of candid photography.

== As an art form ==
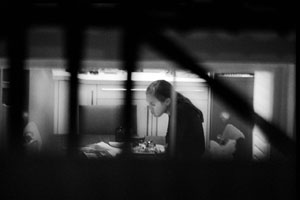
Candid photograph by YBA artist Henry Bond

The person who is generally credited with being the first available light "candid" photographer is Dr. Erich Salomon, who photographed the social elite in Berlin, Germany, and politicians and diplomats during the late 1920s and early 1930s with a 1 3/4 x 2 1/4 glass plate or cut, sheet, film camera called the Ermanox, fitted with an f/1.8 Ernostar lens. The Ermanox was introduced by the Ernemann-Werke (Works) of Dresden, Germany, in 1924.

It was said by the French Minister of the Colonies Aristide Briand, that "There are just three things necessary for a League of Nations conference: a few Foreign Secretaries, a table and Salomon". On seeing Salomon's photographs, so utterly different in revelation from the traditional, posed, studio portraits or the formal, flash-powder illuminated, group photographs, an English editor called them "candid photographs" an art of observation, a phrase that got stuck with the public.

The camera most suited to Salomon's approach, and which came to be dubbed as the "candid camera", was the Leica, the camera designed by Oscar Barnack and introduced by the Ernst Leitz company in 1924 and which was the forerunner of all 35 mm cameras of today.

Some professional photographers developed candid photography into an art form. Henri Cartier-Bresson might be considered the master of the art of candid photography, capturing the "decisive moment" in everyday life over a span of several decades. Arthur Fellig, better known as Weegee, was one of the great photographers to document life in the streets of New York to often capture life — and death — at their rawest edges.

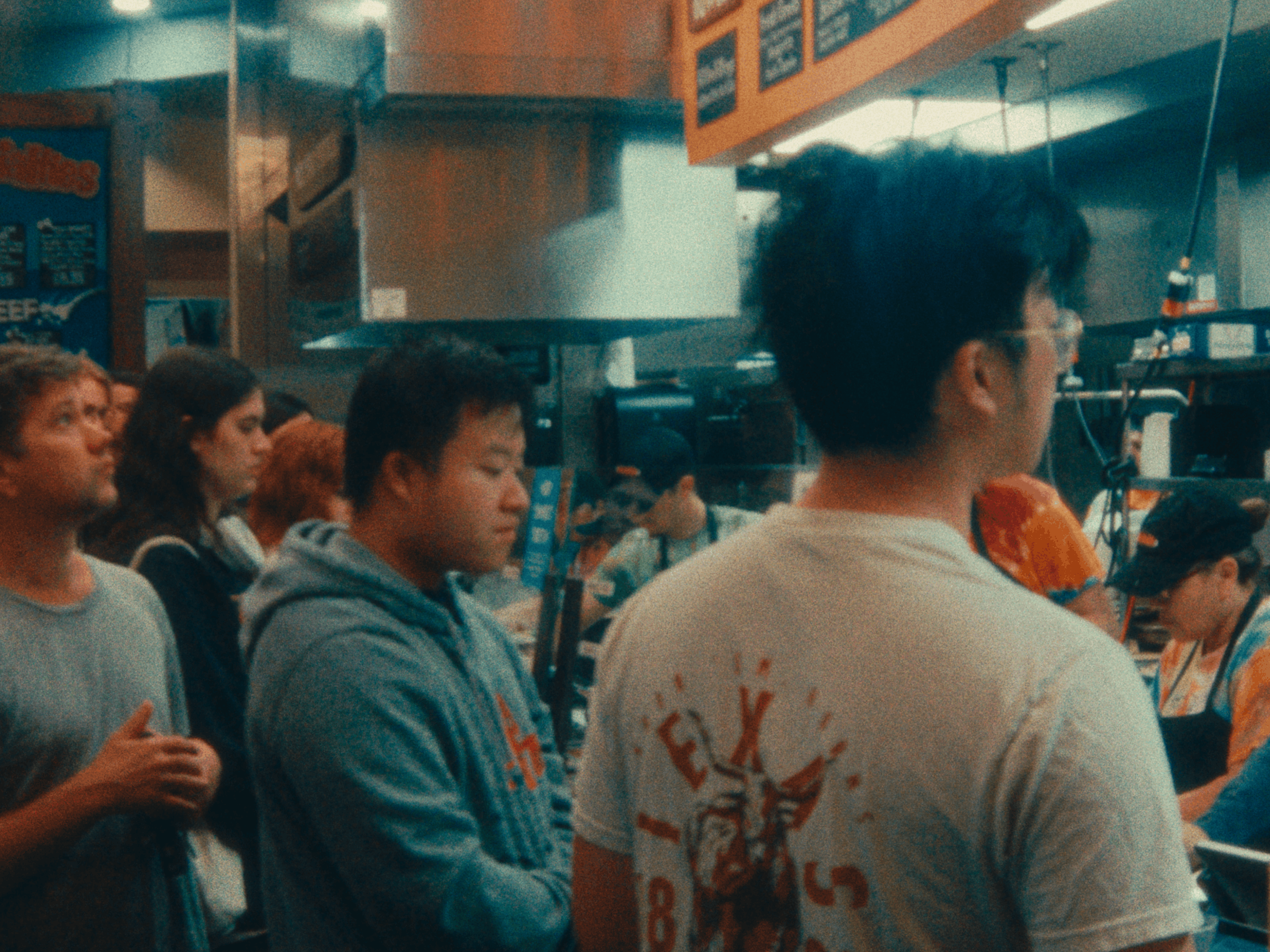
Candid photo taken in 2025

Photographers in the field allow people to be relaxed and at ease around the camera. They do this despite the camera being an intrusive element. How subjects react to photographer's presence with the camera depends on how skilled the artist is. This is true for most celebrity photographers, such as René Burri, or Raeburn Flerlage.

It could be argued that candid photography is the purest form of photojournalism. There is a fine line between photojournalism and candid photography, a line that was blurred by photographers such as Bresson and Weegee. Photojournalism often sets out to tell a story in images, whereas candid photography simply captures people living an event.

== Camera equipment ==
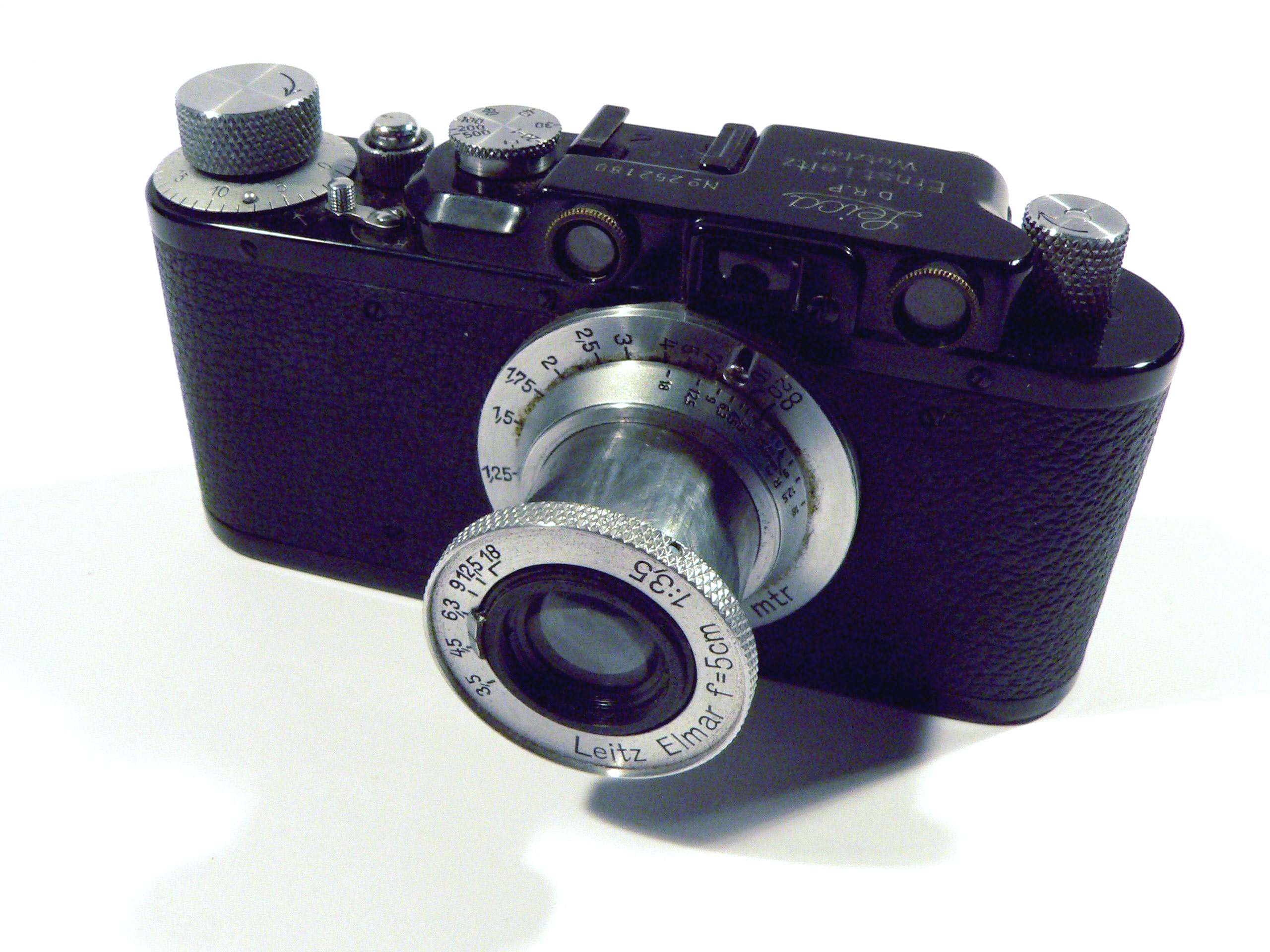
The 35mm Leica camera first introduced in the 1920s is associated with candid photography.

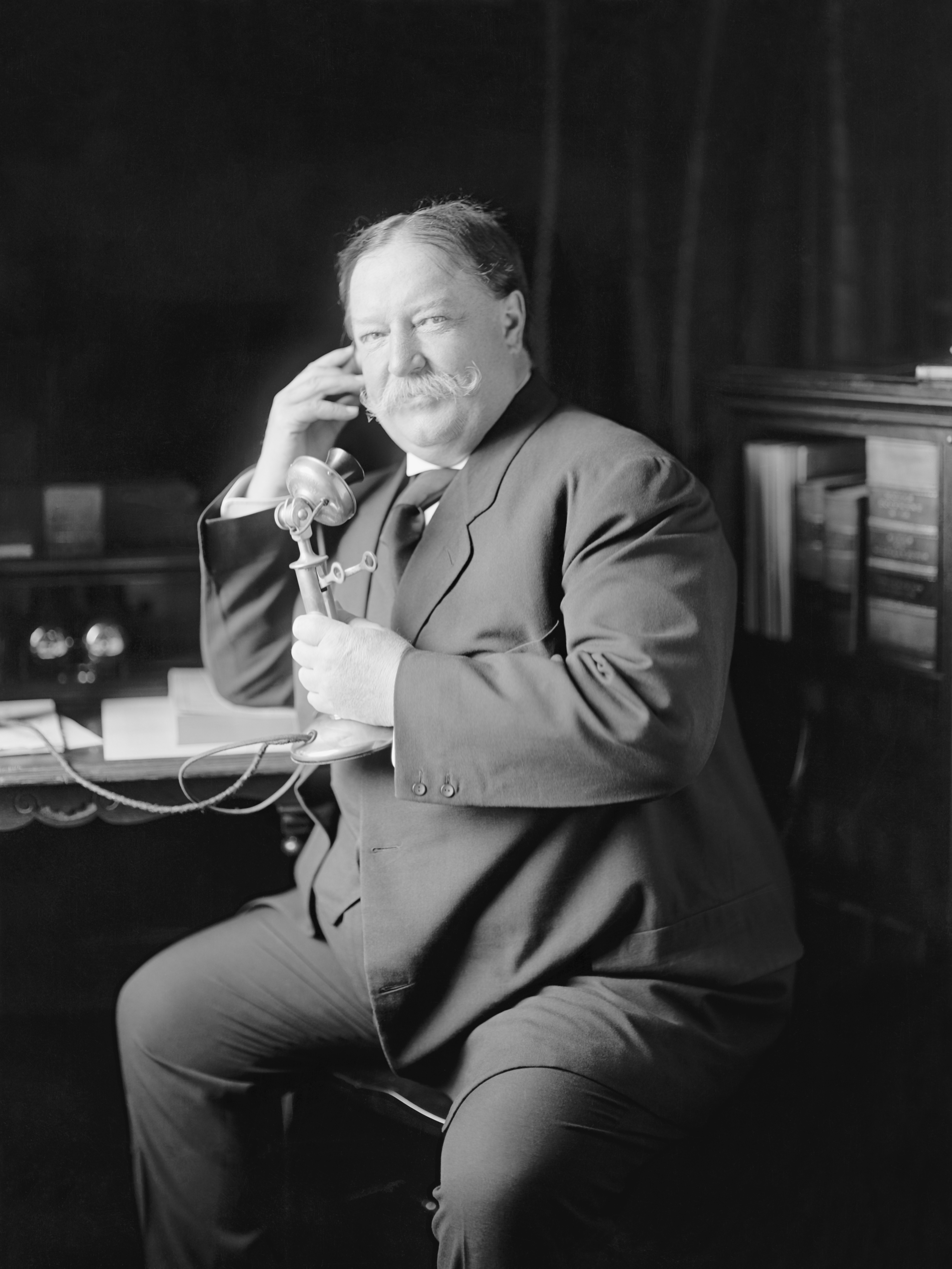
One of a 1908 series of candid photographs by George W. Harris titled The Evolution of a Smile; just after a formal portrait session, William Howard Taft learns by telephone from Theodore Roosevelt that he has been nominated by the Republican Party for the office of President.

Unobtrusive camera equipment, often small in size, is preferred for candid photography to avoid disturbing subjects.

Candid photography also typically requires use of available light since flash alerts subjects to the camera and may startle them and cause them to react or become self-conscious and stage their photo appearance rather than behaving naturally. For that reason, early candid photography took place outdoors, where the sun provides ample light. Indoor candid photography required the development of more sensitive films with higher film speeds (ISO) and aggressive methods of developing films ("push processing") to increase sensitivity. Therefore, candid photography was historically associated with the grainy, high contrast images that result from these techniques. The introduction of digital cameras has made it easier to take pictures in low light conditions without flash. Full-frame DSLR and mirrorless cameras have brought high-ISO noise to historically low levels, allowing for clean, saturated images at higher ISO.

== See also ==
- Candid Camera
- Celebrity photography
- Documentary photography
- Paparazzi
- Photojournalism
- Reportage
- Secret photography
- Snapshot (photography)
- Street photography
- Upskirt photography
