= Legality of recording by civilians =

The legality of recording by civilians refers to laws regarding the recording of other persons and property by civilians through the means of still photography, videography, and audio recording in various locations. Although it is common for the recording of public property, persons within the public domain, and of private property visible or audible from the public domain to be legal, laws have been passed restricting such activity in order to protect the privacy of others, often at the expense of those who seek to invade others' privacy. The laws governing still photography may be vastly different from the laws governing any type of motion picture photography.

In the United States, anti-photography laws have been passed following the September 11, 2001 attacks and the increased popularity of camera phones. There might be local laws and policies governing the specific landmark or property in which one seeks to photograph. Laws on private property differ. Owners of private property in most places must authorize recording on their own property.

== Exceptions ==
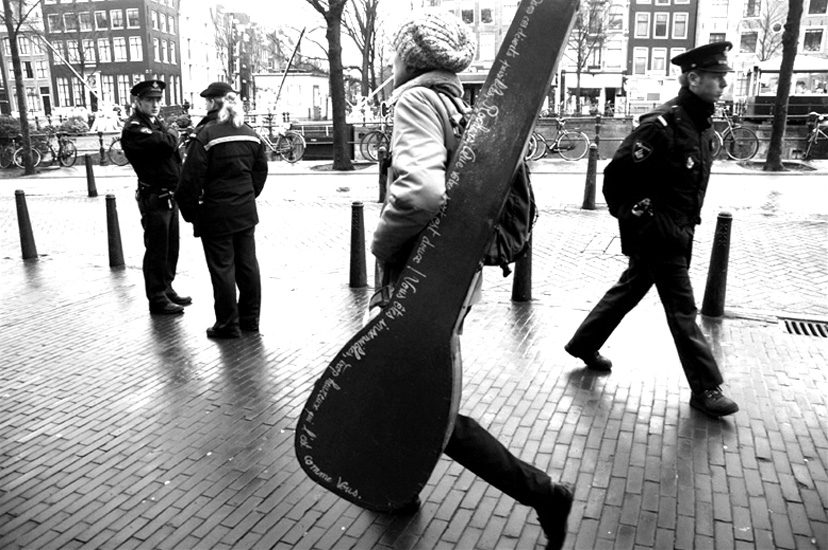
Photographing police officers in Amsterdam, the Netherlands.

=== High-profile locations ===
Signs posted around many bridges, including the Verrazzano–Narrows Bridge, state that filming the structure is prohibited. The legality of such restrictions is problematic; in view of the First Amendment in the United States of America, restrictions on taking pictures of a public structure in public may be unconstitutional (as prohibiting taking pictures will probably neither prevent nor reduce the potential for terrorist acts, nor do such prohibitions necessarily mean it will in any way hinder someone from committing an attack in the first place). The courts have held, however, that in some cases, restrictions on taking pictures on military reservations such as military bases, can be constitutionally valid, so a restriction on taking a picture of a structure that is operated by the military or is on a military reservation might be constitutional, but even then, such restrictions must be reasonable and have some relevant purpose.

In August 2004, an Annandale, Virginia man was arrested and detained when his wife was observed by a police officer filming the Chesapeake Bay Bridge as he drove across. He was held as a material witness after he was found to have ties to Hamas.

=== Voyeurism ===
Many places have passed or considered legislation that prohibits voyeurism with phones and other similar devices, commonly referred to as "upskirting" or "downblousing." Such behaviors have become common since camera phones have become popular, thereby raising such concerns. On March 7, 2014, Massachusetts Supreme Judicial Court hearing ruled that taking photos of someone up their skirt was not specifically prevented by peeping tom laws. The Massachusetts Supreme Court Judges concluded that since the current laws did not make any distinction for clothed individuals, only for 'partially or completely' undressed ones, it was legal under current Massachusetts law. The very next day, legislation was introduced to ban upskirting in its entirety. It soon received bipartisan support and was approved and enacted on March 8, 2014.

=== Public display ===
Laws prohibiting the photography of civilians for public display have prevented the creation of recordings for Google Street View in some countries in Europe.

=== Voice recording ===
Laws differ in the United States on how many parties must give their consent before a conversation may be recorded. In 38 states and the District of Columbia, conversations may be recorded if the person is party to the conversation, or if at least one of the people who are party to the conversation have given a third party consent to record the conversation. As of 2010, in California, Connecticut, Delaware, Florida, Illinois, Maryland, Massachusetts, New Hampshire, Pennsylvania, Vermont, and Washington State, the consent of all parties of the conversation must be obtained in order to record a conversation. In Nevada, the consent of only one party is required for in-person conversations, but the consent of all parties is required for telephone conversations.

In Canada, telephone calls may be recorded without a court order if one of the parties to the call consents to the recording. It is to a judge's discretion as to whether or not to admit the recording into evidence if both parties are not aware of the conversation having been recorded.

== See also ==
- Human bycatch
- Photography and the law
- Street photography
- Sousveillance (inverse surveillance)
- Telephone call recording laws
