= Wildlife observation =

Process of noting the occurrence of animals

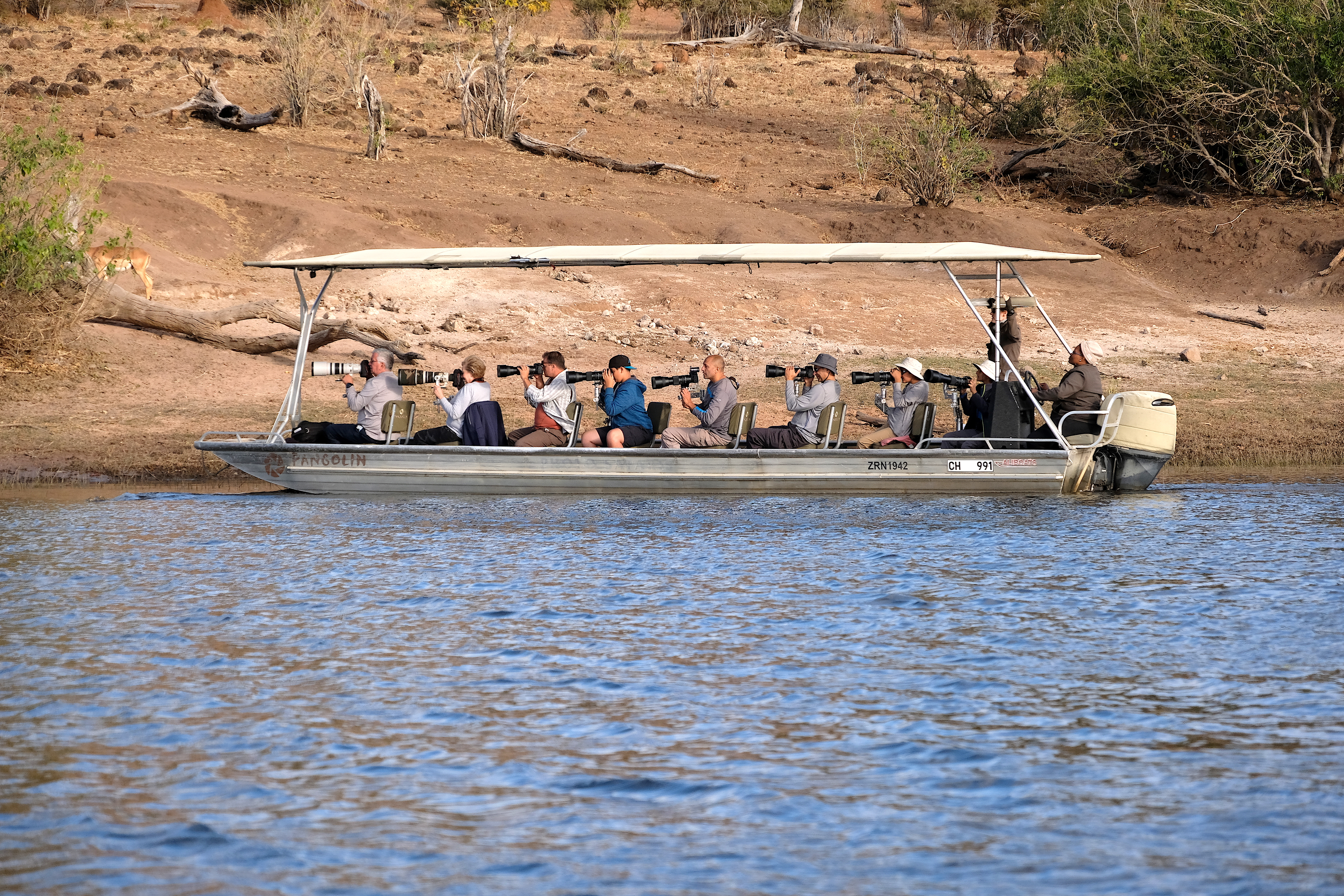
Hobby photographers taking pictures of wildlife at the Chobe River / Botswana (2018)

Wildlife observation is the practice of noting the occurrence or abundance of animal species at a specific location and time, either for research purposes or recreation. Common examples of this type of activity are bird watching and whale watching.

The process of scientific wildlife observation includes the reporting of what (diagnosis of the species), where (geographical location), when (date and time), who (details about observer), and why (reason for observation, or explanations for occurrence). Wildlife observation can be performed if the animals are alive, with the most notable example being face-to-face observation and live cameras, or are dead, with the primary example being the notifying of where roadkill has occurred. This outlines the basic information needed to collect data for wildlife observation; Which can also contribute to scientific investigations of distribution, habitat relations, trends, and movement of wildlife species.

Wildlife observation allows for the study of organisms with minimal disturbance to their ecosystem depending on the type of method or equipment used. The use of equipment such as unmanned aerial vehicles (UAVs), more commonly known as drones, may disturb and cause negative impacts on wildlife. Specialized equipment can be used to collect more accurate data.

== History ==
Wildlife observation is believed to have traced its origins to the rule of Charles II of England when it was first instituted in 1675 at the Royal Observatory in present-day Greenwich, part of London. In modern times, it has been practiced as an observance of wildlife species monitored in areas of vast wilderness.

=== Wildlife tracking ===
The history of wildlife tracking technology involves the evolution of technologies that have been used to monitor, track, and locate many different types of wildlife. Many individuals have an interest in tracking wildlife, including biologists, scientific researchers, and conservationists. Biotelemetry is "the instrumental technique for gaining and transmitting information from a living organism and its environment to a remote observer".

== Importance ==
Through wildlife observation, there are many important details that can be discovered about the environment. For instance, if a fisher in Taiwan discovers that a certain species of fish he/she frequently catches is becoming rarer and rarer, there might be a substantial issue in the water that fisher is fishing in. It could be that there is a new predator in the water that has changed the animal food chain, a source of pollution, or perhaps even a larger problem. Regardless of the reason, this process of observing animals can help identify potential issues before they become severe problems in the world.

Additionally, through animal observation, those who participate are also actively participating in the conservation of animal life. Oftentimes, the two subjects go hand-in-hand with one another because through the observation of animals, individuals are also discovering what issues animals around the world are currently facing and if there are any ways to put up a fight against them. With more observation, fewer species of animals will become extinct.

== Research ==
Before one can get started observing wildlife and helping the environment, it is important to research the animal they are choosing to observe. If one simply went into the observation process and skipped the crucial process of obtaining knowledge about the animals, it would be difficult for them to determine if anything was out of the ordinary. Before observing, it would be wise to find out simple information about the animal such as:

- What the animal eats - Is the animal a carnivore, herbivore, or omnivore?
- What animals prey on the animal?
- Where does the animal live?
- Is the animal dangerous?
- Is it endangered?
- Does the animal travel in packs or alone?
- What are the animal's sleeping habits?

== Projects and programs devoted to wildlife observation ==
=== Projects ===
There are a variety of projects and websites devoted to wildlife observations. One of the most common projects is for bird observations (for example: e-bird). For those who enjoy bird watching, there are a variety of ways one can contribute to this type of wildlife observation. The National Wildlife Refuge System has volunteer opportunities, citizen science projects, and if one is limiting in time; could purchase a Federal Duck Stamp that donates money to the wildlife refuge lands. In the past few years, websites dedicated to reporting wildlife across broad taxonomic ranges have become available. For example, the California Roadkill Observation System provides a mechanism for citizen-scientists in California to report wildlife species killed by vehicles. The Maine Audubon Wildlife Road Watch allows reporting of observations of both dead and live animals along roads. A more recent addition to wildlife observation tools are the web sites that facilitate uploading and management of images from remote wildlife cameras. For example, the Smithsonian Institution supports the eMammal and Smithsonian Wild programs, which provide a mechanism for volunteer deployment of wildlife cameras around the world. Similarly, the Wildlife Observer Network hosts over a dozen wildlife-camera projects from around the world, providing tools and a database to manage photographs and camera networks.

=== Monitoring programs ===
Monitoring programs for wildlife utilize new and easier ways to monitor animal species for citizen scientists and research scientists alike. One such monitoring device is the automated recorder. Automated recorders are a reliable way to monitor species such as bird, bats, and amphibians as they provide ability to save and independently identify a specific animal call. The automated recorder analyzes the sounds of the species to identify the species and how many there are. It was found that using the automated recorders produced larger quantity and even more quality data when compared with traditional, point-count data recording. While providing better quality, it also provides a permanent record of the census which can be continually reviewed for any potential bias. This monitoring device can improve wildlife observation and potentially save more animals. Using this device can allow for continued tracking of populations, continued censusing of individuals within a species, and allow for faster population size estimates.

== Live watching and observation ==
=== Birdwatching ===
One of the most popular forms of wildlife observation, birdwatching, is typically performed as a recreational pleasure. Those looking to birdwatch typically travel into a forest or other wooded area with a pair of binoculars in hand to aid the process. Birdwatching has become all the more important with the amount of deforestation that has been occurring in the world. Birds are arguably the most important factor in the balance of environmental systems: "They pollinate plants, disperse seeds, scavenge carcasses and recycle nutrients back into the earth." A decrease in the total number of birds would cause destruction to much of the environmental system. The plants and trees around the world would die at an alarming rate which would, in turn, set off a chain reaction that would cause many other animals to die due to the environment change and habitat loss.

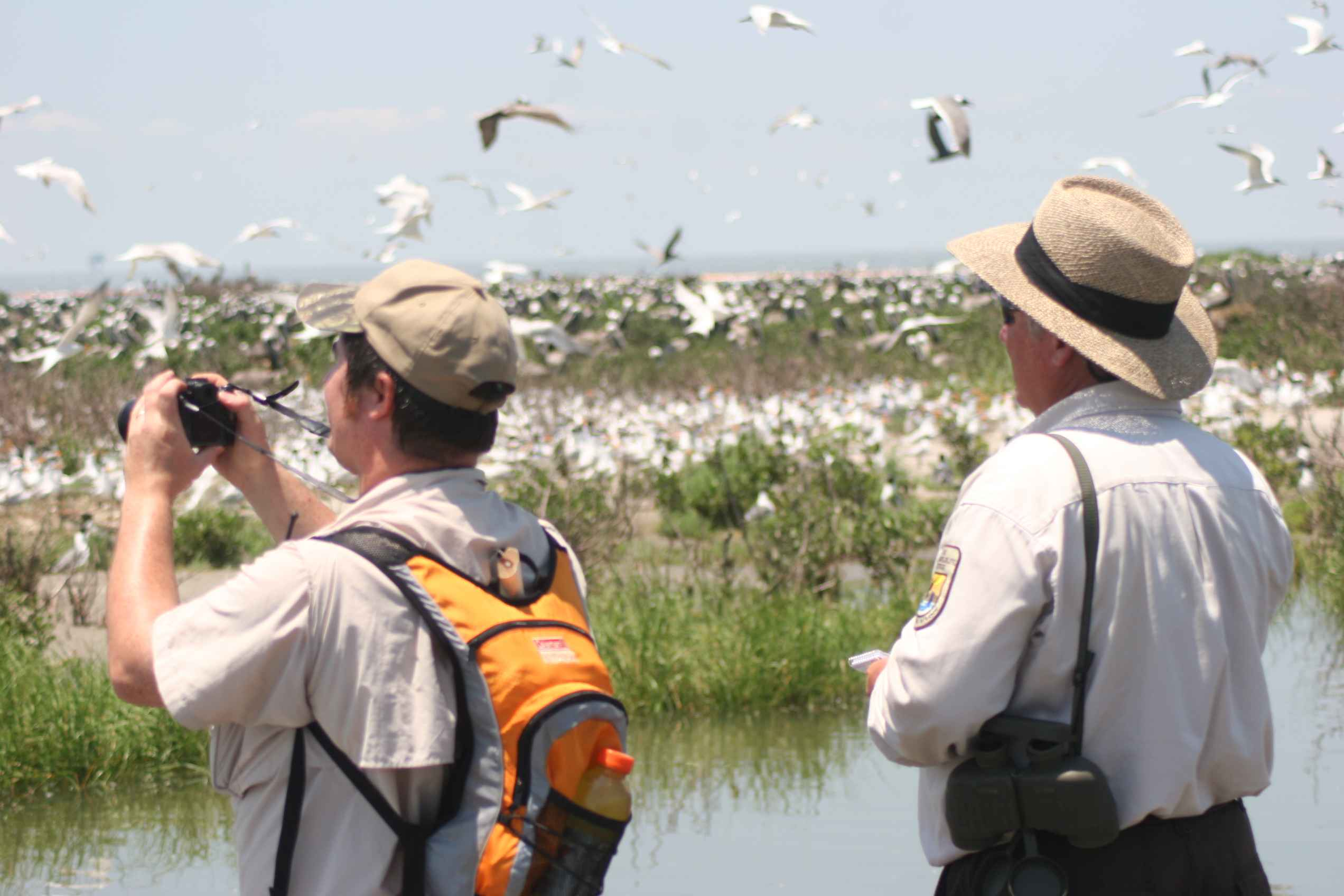
Birdwatchers on a beach

One of the ways that birdwatching has an effect on the environment as a whole is that through consistent birdwatching, an observer would be able to identify whether they are seeing less of a certain species of bird. If this happens, there typically is a reasons for the occurrence, whether it be because of an increase in pollution in the area or possibly an increase in the population of predators. If a watcher were to take notice of a change in what they typically see, they could notify the city or park and allow them to investigate into the cause a bit further. Through this action, birdwatchers are preserving the future for both animal and human life.

Subsequently, by taking children birdwatching it is allowing the future generation to understand the importance of animal observation. These children will pioneer conservation movements and attempt to protect the habit for all animals.

=== Livestreams ===
Live streams of animal exhibits at various zoos and aquariums across the United States have also become extremely popular, along with live-streaming webcams located in various natural habitats, such as wildlife refuges and bird nests. The Tennessee Aquarium has a webcam that allows online viewers to take a look into the happening so their Secret Reef exhibit which consists of reef fish, sharks, and a rescued green sea turtle.

Perhaps the most popular animals cams in the United States though come from, naturally, the largest zoo in the United States: The San Diego Zoo. The San Diego Zoo features eight live cams on their website – A panda, elephant, ape, penguin, polar bear, tiger, condor, and koala. The purpose of the live streams is to help educate the public about the behaviors of several different animals and to entertain those who might not be able to travel to a zoo.

Other notable zoos that have webcams include the National Zoo, Woodland Park Zoo, Houston Zoo, and Atlanta Zoo.

=== Collecting data ===
Data collection is a common method of observing live animals. Observation may be conducted via livestream or in the field, though data gathered from animals in their natural habitat is generally considered more useful.

The type of data collected varies according to the purpose of the study. For example, if someone is interested in how deer interact with other animals in a certain location, it would be beneficial for them to take notes and record all of the animals that are native to the area where the deer are located. From there, they can describe any scenarios in which the deer had a positive or negative interaction with the other species of animals. In this instance, it would not really be helpful for the observer to collect data pertaining to the types of food the deer eat because the study is only focusing on the interaction amongst animals.

Another example of how collecting data on wildlife would be useful is keeping track of the total number of a certain species exists within a forest. Naturally, it will be impossible to get a definitive number but if an accurate approximation can be made, it could be beneficial in determining if there has been a random increase or decrease in the population. If there is an increase, it could be due to a change in the species migration habits and if there is a decrease, it could be due to an external factor such as pollution or introduction of a new predator.

== Deceased wildlife observation ==
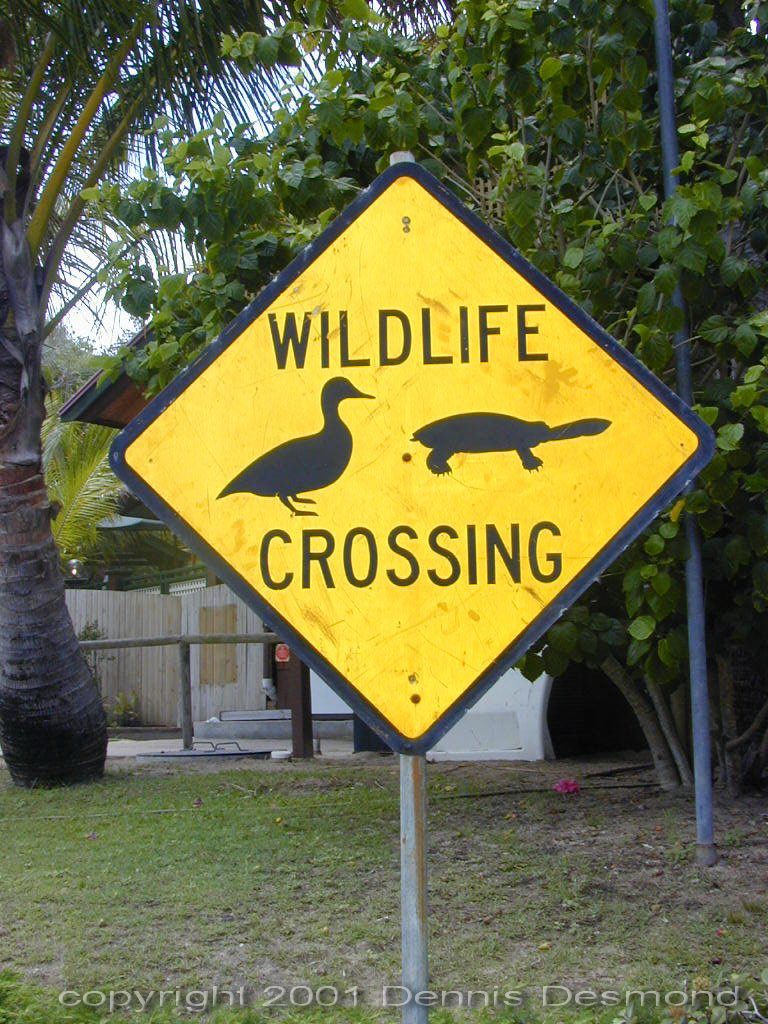
An example of a wildlife crossing sign

=== Online systems and mobile apps ===
Many states have already begun to set up websites and systems for the public. The main purpose behind the movement is so that they can notify other individuals about road-killed wildlife. If enough people fill out the forms located on the websites, the government will become notified that there have been occurrences of a loss of animal life and will take the steps required to prevent it. Typically, the step that is taken is the posting of a wildlife crossing sign that, in turn, allows the public to know where there are common animal crossings. Maine and California are the states that have been the pioneers of this movement and this process has become particularly important on heavily traveled roads as no one would like endanger the animals or themselves.

Currently, there is an app (available on both iPhone and Android devices) made specifically for the purpose of identifying road-kill called “Mobile Mapper.” The app is a partner of the HerpMapper website. The purpose of the website is to use the user recorded observations for research and conservation purposes.

On average, the cost of repairing a car that has been damaged by a deer or other medium to large-sized animal is $2,000. Even though there is no way that accidents involving animals can completely be prevented, placing more signs about possible animal crossings zones would cause drivers to drive more carefully and therefore have fewer accidents. Economically, this means that more families will be saving money and it could be used in a different way to help contributed to society as a whole.

== Issues leading to the extinction of animals ==
=== Climate change ===
Climate change is one of the most heavily discussed topics around the world today, both politically and scientifically. The climate that Earth is currently experiencing has been steadily changing over time due to both natural causes and human exploitation. Climate change has the potential to be detrimental to wildlife across the world, whether that be through rising sea levels, changes in temperatures through the years, or deforestation. These are just a few of the examples of the contributing factors to climate change.

Climate change is not something that citizens can entirely prevent from happening even if they wanted to. There are many natural causes such as volcanic activity and the Earth's orbit around the Sun that are strong contributing factors to the phenomena. There are, however, prevention measures that can be taken to prevent climate change from happening as quickly. The primary way to prevent climate change is for society to reduce the amount of greenhouse gases that are present in the atmosphere. This can be done through the improving of energy efficiency in many buildings, the stoppage of deforestation so more carbon dioxide can be removed from the atmosphere, and mode switching.

==== Rising sea levels ====
One of the more notable effects climate change has on the environment is the rising of sea levels around the world. Over the past 100 years, the sea level has risen approximately 1.8 millimeters each year. The steady rise in sea levels can be attributed to the steadily increasing temperatures the Earth faces each year which causes the ice caps and glaciers to melt. This increase in sea level is detrimental to the coastal ecosystems that exist around the world.

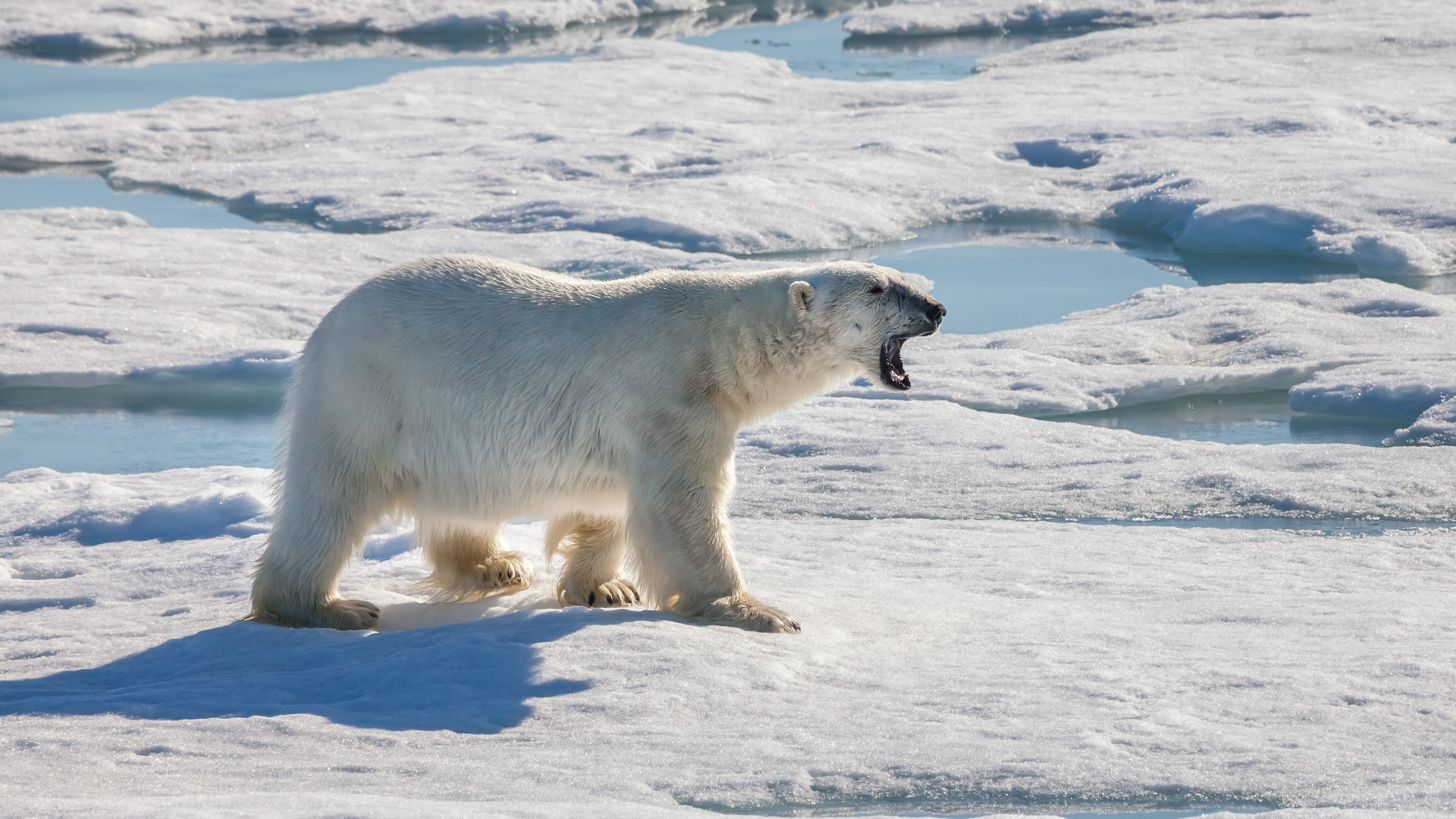
Polar bear hunting for food

The increase in sea level causes flooding on coastal wetlands, where certain animals will be unable to survive due to saltwater inundation. The increase in the total amount of saltwater present in these wetlands could prove to be problematic for many species. While some may simply have to migrate to other areas, smaller ecosystems within the wetlands could be destroyed which, once again, influences the animal food chain.

Polar bears are animals that are specifically affected through the process of rising sea levels. Living near the Arctic region, polar bears find their food on ice caps and sheets of ice. As these sheets continue to become fewer in quantity, it is predicted that the polar bears will have a difficult time sustaining life and that by the year 2050, there could be less than 20,000 on Earth.

Coral reefs are the primary ecosystem that would be affected through a continuing increase in the sea level:

"The coral reef ecosystem is adapted to thrive within certain temperature and sea level range. Corals live in a symbiotic relationship with photosynthetic zooxanthellae. Zooxanthellae need the sunlight in order to produce the nutrients necessary for the coral. Sea level rise may cause a decrease in solar radiation at the sea surface level, affecting the ability of photosynthetic zooxanthellae to produce nutrients for the coral, whereas, a sudden exposure of the coral reef to the atmosphere due to a low tide event may induce coral bleaching."

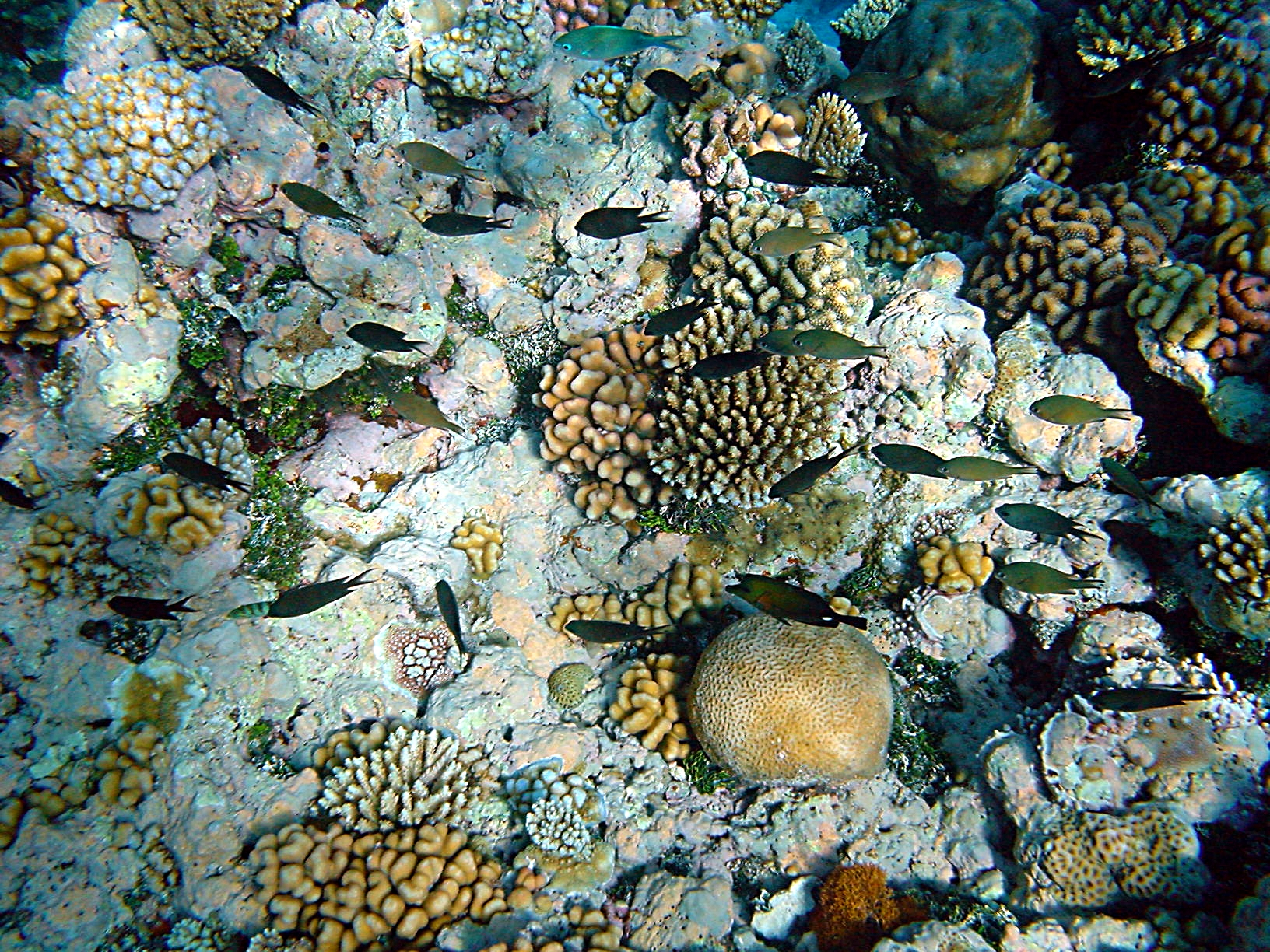
Coral reef with fish

The loss of coral would have a subsequent effect on the total number of fish that exist within these ecosystems. In the Indo-Pacific coral reefs alone, there are in-between 4000 and 5000 different species of fish that have a relationship with the species of coral. Specifically, the numerous different species of butterfly fish that feed on coral within these reefs would be affected if the coral was unable to live due to an increase in sea level. Referring back to the food chain topic, this would then subsequently but directly affect species of snappers, eels, and sharks that use butterfly fish as a primary source of food. If the snappers cannot find any butterfly fish to eat because the butterfly fish are dying due to the lack of coral, it means that the snapper population will decrease as well.

The rising of sea level has the possibility to be catastrophic to the coastal ecosystems.

=== Pollution ===
Pollution is another crucial threat to animal life, and human life, across the world. Every form of pollution has an effect on wildlife, whether it be through the air, water, or ground. While sometimes the origin and form of pollution is visible and easy to determine, other times it can be a mystery as to what exactly is causing the death of animals. Through constant and consistent observation of habitat analysis, humans can help prevent the loss of animal life by recognizing the early signs of pollution before the problem becomes too large.

==== Ocean and water pollution ====
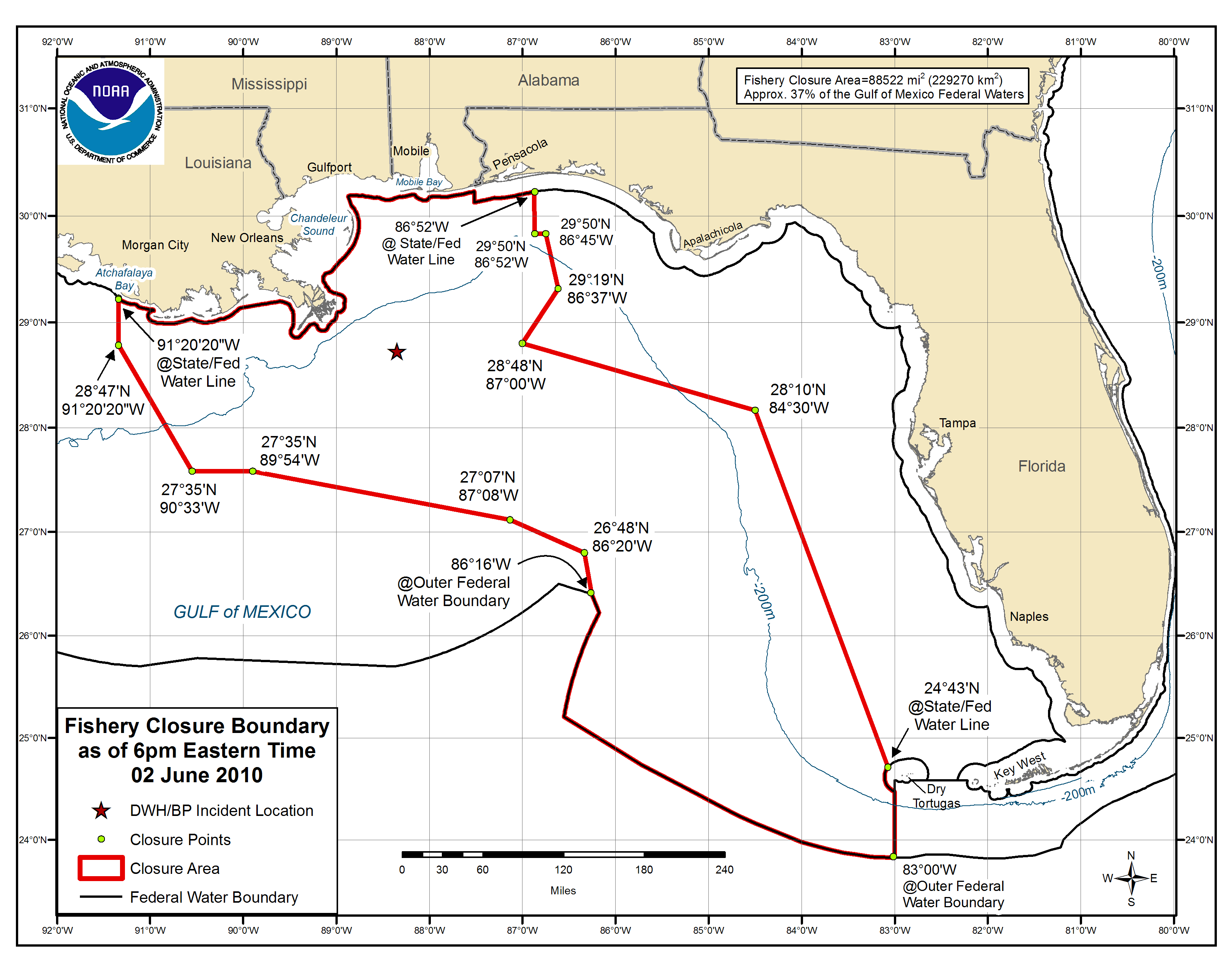
Map of the area where fishing was affected because of the BP oil spill

Pollution can enter bodies of water in many different ways - Through toxic runoff from pesticides and fertilizers, containers of oil and other hazardous materials falling off of ships, or just from debris from humans that has not been picked up. No matter what the form of pollution is, the effects water pollution has on animal life can be drastic. For example, the BP oil spill which occurred in 2010 impacted over 82,000 birds, 6,000 sea turtles, approximately 26,000 marine animals, and hundreds of thousands of fish.

While the observation of how animal life was and has been affected by this spill is unique and definitely on a larger scale, it still represents an accurate depiction of how observation can be crucial to animal lives. For example, by observing that a certain species of sea turtle was affected by the oil spill, zoologists and their teams would be able to determine the effects the loss of that sea turtle would have.

Another prominent example is how if one day a fisherman goes to a lake that he/she frequently visits and notices two or three dead fish on the surface. Knowing that that frequently does not happen, the fisherman tells his local city officials and park rangers about the occurrence and they find out that a farmer has been using a new pesticide that runs off into the lake. By simply observing what is common and what is not, the effects of some water pollution can be stopped before becoming too severe.

==== Air pollution ====
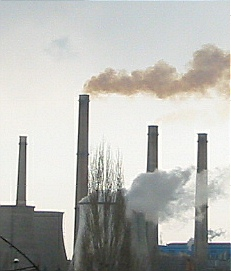
Smoke coming from a factory

Air pollution is commonly associated with the image of billowing clouds of smoke rising into the sky from a large factory. While the fumes and smoke previously stated definitely is a prominent form of air pollution, it is not the only one. Air pollution can come from the emission of cars, smoking, and other sources. Air pollution does not just affect birds though, like one may have thought. Air pollution affects mammals, birds, reptiles, and any other organism that requires oxygen to live. Frequently, if there is any highly dangerous air pollution, the animal observation process will be rather simple: There will be an abundance of dead animals located near the vicinity of the pollution.

The primary concern of air pollution is how widespread the pollution can become in a short period of time. Acid rain is one of the largest forms of pollution today. The issue with acid rain is that it affects literally every living organism it comes in contact with, whether that be trees in a forest, water in an ocean or lake, or the skin of humans and animals. Typically, acid rain is a combination of sulfur dioxide and nitrogen oxides that are emitted from factories. If it is not controlled in a timely manner, it could lead to loss of life due to the dangerous nature of the composition of the rain.

=== Deforestation ===
Deforestation has become one of the most prevalent issues environmentally. With a continuously growing population and not having the space to contain all the humans on Earth, forests are frequently the first areas that are cleared to make more room. According to National Geographic, forests still cover approximately 30 percent of the land on Earth but each year large portions are cleared.

With deforestation, there are numerous subsequent side effects. Most notably, the clearing of entire forests (in some instances) destroys the habitat for hundreds of species of animals and 70 percent of the animals that reside in the forest will die as a result. Additionally, deforestation causes a reduction in the total canopy cover which leads to more extreme temperature swings on the ground level because there are no branches and leaves to catch the sun's rays.

The way to combat the severe effects on the loss of animal life would be to stop cutting trees and forests down. While this is unlikely and almost impossible to happen, there is another solution: the partial removal of forests. Removing only portions of the forest keeps the environment of the entire forest intact which allows the animals to adapt to their surroundings. Additionally, it is recommended that for every tree that is cut down another one be planted elsewhere in the forest.

== Economic effects of animal observation ==
=== Costs of observation ===
Typically, the costs of animal observation are minuscule. As previously stated, animal observation can be done on a small or large scale; it just depends what goal an individual has in mind. For example, animal observation can be performed in the backyard of a house or at a local state park at no charge. All one would have to do is take a notepad, phone, or other device to write down their data and observations. On a larger scale, animal observation could be performed at an animal reserve, where the associated costs would be those associated with keeping the animals happy inside the reserve.

While it is impossible to pinpoint exactly how much the zoos across the world spend on live streaming, it is estimated to be in the $1,000 range for every camera that is set up.

=== Costs that observation prevents ===
Referring back to the example from the "Deceased Wildlife Observation" section, it becomes apparent how animal observation can save families and the government money. With the average cost of repairing a car that has damage from a large sized animal being $2,000, families and the government could save money by making the public aware that they should proceed with caution in areas where animals have been hit.

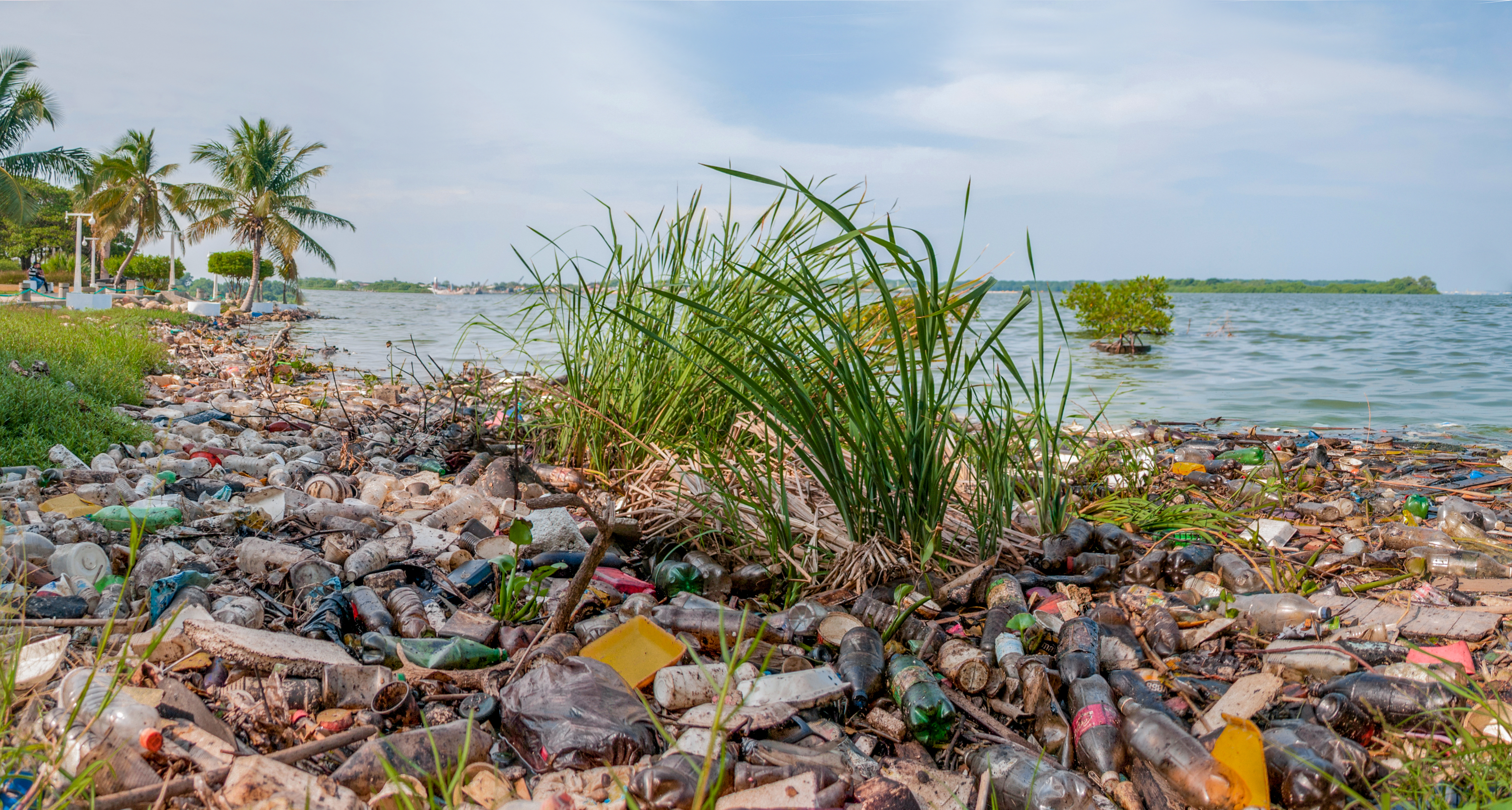
Water pollution at Maracaibo lake

Additionally, approximately $44 million of the $4.3 billion spent on water purity is spent each year on protecting aquatic species from nutrient pollution. It is encouraging that the government is willing to spend the money to help save animals' lives, sometimes the effects of the pollution take effect before they are able to stop them entirely. One million seabirds and hundred thousand aquatic mammals and fish that are killed as a result of water pollution each year and that has its economic effects, both directly and indirectly.

Directly, the loss of aquatic mammals and fish has a direct impact on the sales of food. The EPA estimated recently that the effects of pollution cost the fishing industry tens of millions of dollars in sales. Indirectly, the loss of birds causes humans to spend more money on pest control because the food chain is out of order. The small rodents and insects that some birds prey upon are no longer being killed if the birds die. This means more of these pests find their ways into homes which causes more people to call exterminators, therefore setting off a chain reaction. The exterminators then must use insecticides to kill the animals which can have harmful runoff into the ground and local water systems, instead of allowing it to be done naturally by the animal food chain.

== See also ==
- Animal migration tracking
- Human bycatch
- Wildlife photography
