= Human bycatch =

People who are unintentionally recorded by wildlife monitoring equipment

Human bycatch (or human by-catch) is a term for people who are unintentionally caught on film, in photos, or acoustically recorded on equipment used to monitor wildlife or habitats for the purpose of conservation, or environmental law enforcement. It comes from the term bycatch, which is used in fishing practices to designate non-target species that are caught in a fishing net. Nearly every remote monitoring study contains human by-catch, yet there are no standardized rules or policies regarding what the researchers can or should do with their data.

== Camera traps ==
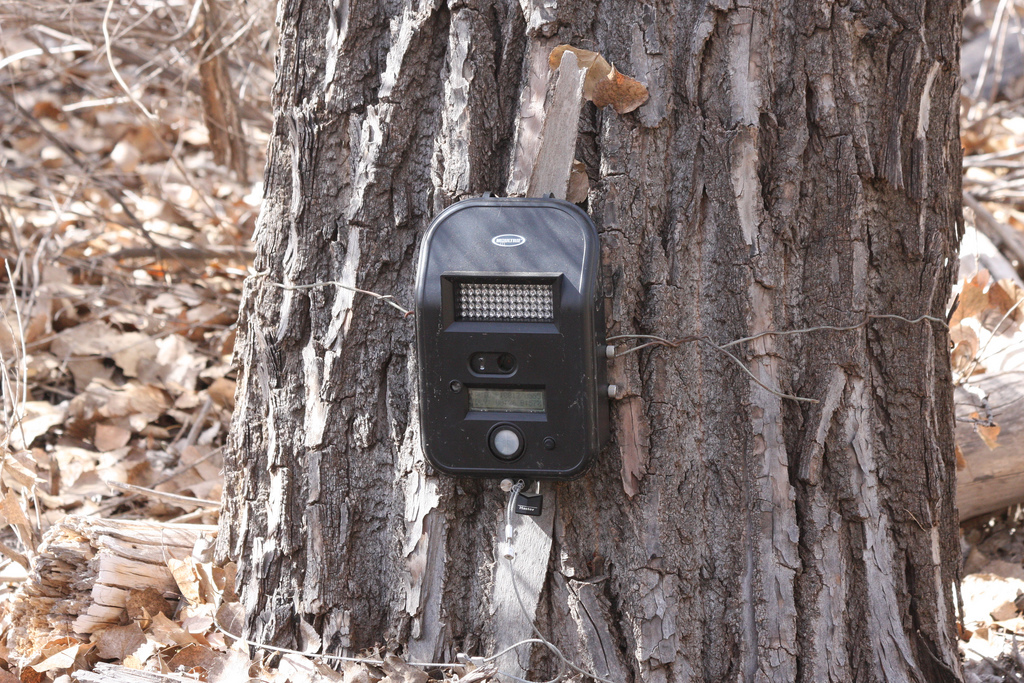
Camera on cottonwood tree

=== Description and uses ===
Camera traps are typically a large network of cameras that are set up in the environment to capture images of wildlife. Most camera traps have some sort of sensor to trigger the shutter; usually by movement or heat (infrared). They are used widely in conservation work, by field biologists, and, to a lesser extent, by hobbyists, and hunters. Camera traps end up with many false triggers, such as moving vegetation, false heat reading from warm wind, and accidental human capture. These types of monitoring systems will, by design, capture and retain many photos of people. Camera trapping is still very human-intensive work, requiring a lot of effort to go through the thousands of images that are collected. Camera traps are useful tools for both land and marine conservation, environmental and wildlife management, and environmental law enforcement. By placing high resolution cameras along the shoreline, a network of cameras are able to monitor illegal fishing practices in protected, no-fish areas. Camera traps are not limited to the land; they are even used underwater, and, similar to land-based camera traps, use an automatic trigger when movement is detected in view of the frame. They are utilized at airports to help prevent incidents of wildlife collisions with aircraft. Camera traps are even used in elementary education settings, helping to bring young students closer to the natural world around them. By taking advantage of night vision technology, the students can learn about and see wildlife in their school yard that they never would have been able to see, before. Field research biologists generally try to locate their cameras away from areas of high human traffic, because increased presence of humans generally has a negative correlation with presence of wildlife.

=== Privacy concerns ===
Most people associate going "into the wild" with a reasonable expectation of privacy. It is not uncommon for hikers and backpackers to engage in private behavior, as in, something they would not want others to see, such as urinating. Private behaviors such as this have been caught on many camera traps. In fact, because humans are so abundant, and the areas that need conservation focus are usually areas in which humans share with the target species or habitat, nearly every study using camera traps has ended up with human by-catch. It is not uncommon for researchers to end up with more photos of humans than of their target species. There are instances of a by-catch photo of a coworker urinating, or similar situations, being saved and posted publicly as a joke. By-catch photos of people engaging in activity that may or may not be illegal, but undesired, has been posted publicly to influence the people in the study area to act differently. The line between a joke, a well-intentioned push for better behavior, and invasion of privacy, is thin. There are already potential solutions on the market. The technology to automatically flag, blur, or remove photos containing humans exists, and will only improve with time. While there are no broad requirements to do so, individual organizations could make this policy.

== Drones ==
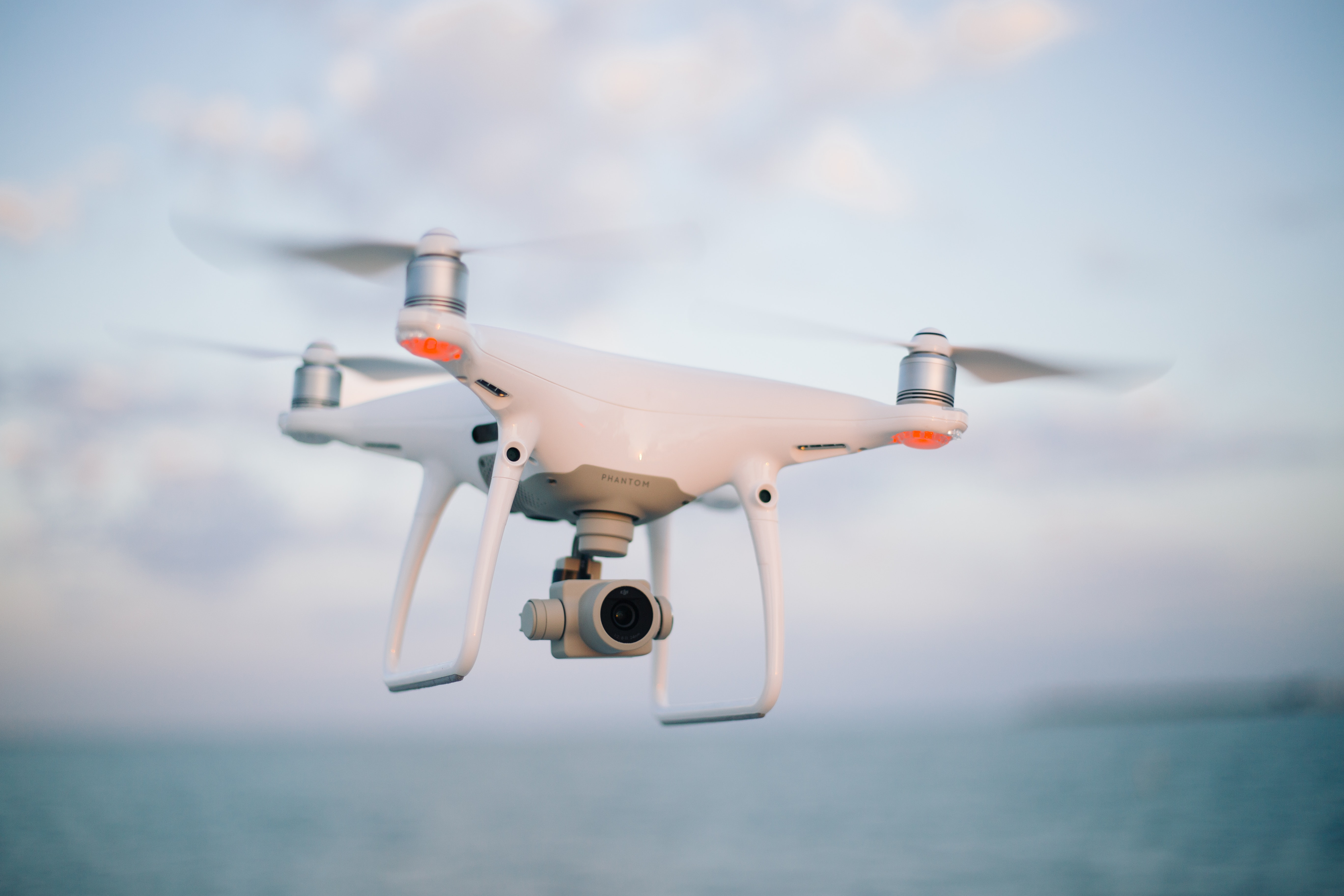
Quadcopter camera drone in flight

=== Description and uses ===
Drones are unoccupied aircraft vehicles that are remotely controlled by a person. While often associated with military use, the decreasing cost of the technology has allowed for civil use of drones to grow. Drones are being increasingly used in the fields of resource management and conservation because of their light weight and small stature, and their speed. They also have reduced risk of injury and death when compared to traditional field biologist aerial surveys, and are less invasive than humans in the field.

Drones are beneficial in a variety of environments, including marine. Because of their speed and ease of setup to take off, they can quickly be launched to record identifying data of boats illegally fishing in protected areas. The altitude at which drones fly allows nearly non-invasive observation of marine wildlife. Because of the ability to follow quick moving wildlife and take very high resolution images, drones are very beneficial in both species identification and individual identification of whales and dolphins. Similar to marine environments, forests are vast areas that can be difficult and slow to patrol on foot, or even by vehicle. Forests are one of the most exploited environments on earth, and due to their large, widespread nature, are difficult to manage. Drones allow observation of vast areas in a relatively short amount of time, and can produce aerial imagery to identify a multitude of activities, including illegal logging, fire activity, trespassing, and wildlife tracking. Drones are not only used for forest conservation, but also by timber companies.

=== Privacy concerns ===
Drones are increasingly used for law enforcement in Africa, where poaching is one of the biggest threats to endangered species. While beneficial in finding and pursuing poachers, this type of surveillance conservation can create fear among the people who live in the region. These technologies that can be used to track down wildlife, can just as easily be programmed to track down people. Drones have moved the line of sight upwards; where a backyard fence used to afford privacy from passerby, a drone operating in public airspace now may have clear view of one's yard. American public perception of drones is generally positive, with privacy being the main concern. A drone operator may not always be visible or accessible, which could raise security concerns. Americans are willing to give up a certain level of privacy for the technology and convenience drones may offer, for things such as package delivery.

Potential solutions to the issue of passive human by-catch include image-altering technology to automatically pixelate identifying portions of images, such as a person's face or license plate number. These issues are separate from a more overt use of drones for the purpose of surveillance. There is a concept of behavioral privacy; the idea that a person's behavior differs if they know they are being watched, or not. If one lives in an area where drones are being used for surveillance, their behavioral privacy is compromised, as they do not feel that they have the freedom to act naturally.

== Acoustic recording ==
=== Description and uses ===
Acoustic recording is commonly used in field biology work to confirm the presence of a species, and in conservation law enforcement, to help prevent or catch poachers. Acoustic recording devices may be passive (recording all the time) or active (recording only when triggered). Researchers may use a device and software that automatically detect a certain trigger event, such as a specific bird call or gunshot. By using acoustic location technology, law enforcement can locate the approximate location of the gunshot, and use that to pursue poachers.

=== Privacy concerns ===
Anyone in the vicinity of these sound recorders may unknowingly have their conversations and activities recorded. Most states in the US have wire-tapping laws that require consent of one or all parties for certain types of conversations to be recorded — ones where there is a reasonable expectation of privacy. Legal opinions differ on which types of communication fall under this protection.

== US policies and regulations ==
=== Research and conservation policies ===
There are no official policies regarding human by-catch data among research and conservation organizations. Each organization may have its own policies. The technology is still emerging, but there are potential solutions. There are software programs, whose original intent is to ease the burden of the thousands of images that must be checked and logged during a camera trap study. The programs assist in automating the process of filtering out the false positives; photos that were triggered without the target species. Along with filtering out empty frames, this software can detect human presence, and filter out photos of humans. This way, privacy could be ensured if the process was automated, so that no person had access to the photos of the people that were inadvertently taken. Most of the government policies and laws regarding privacy with these technologies are aimed at drones.

=== Law enforcement policies ===
Illegal actions and behaviors that occur on government or public lands, do not afford protection by a reasonable expectation of privacy. Drones are beneficial to aid law enforcement agencies to prevent, confront, and prosecute illegal activities such as logging, poaching, or fishing in a protected marine area. These illegal behaviors often occur in a vast area that is difficult to patrol by foot, or even traditional vehicle. Drones are fast, efficient, and can capture incriminating information with high definition. The intent of the remote recording devices in this case is to catch people engaging in illegal activities, so there is no argument for protection of privacy.

=== Surveillance policies ===
As Lagkas et al. (2018) noted, alongside their potential application, drones raise privacy and security challenges that differ from those of traditional internet systems. Additionally, they argue that a regulatory framework is needed to set security and privacy rules for commercial devices.

=== Notice posting ===
While there is no policy to do so, researchers must decide if they want to post notices in an area where they are monitoring using one of the above referred to remote devices. The purpose of posting is to allow people in the area to know that they may be recorded, if they enter the area. Unfortunately, some people may not appreciate the perceived invasion on their privacy, and may tamper with or vandalize the cameras. In addition, posting notices about equipment puts it at risk to be stolen by thieves.

=== FAA regulation on drones ===
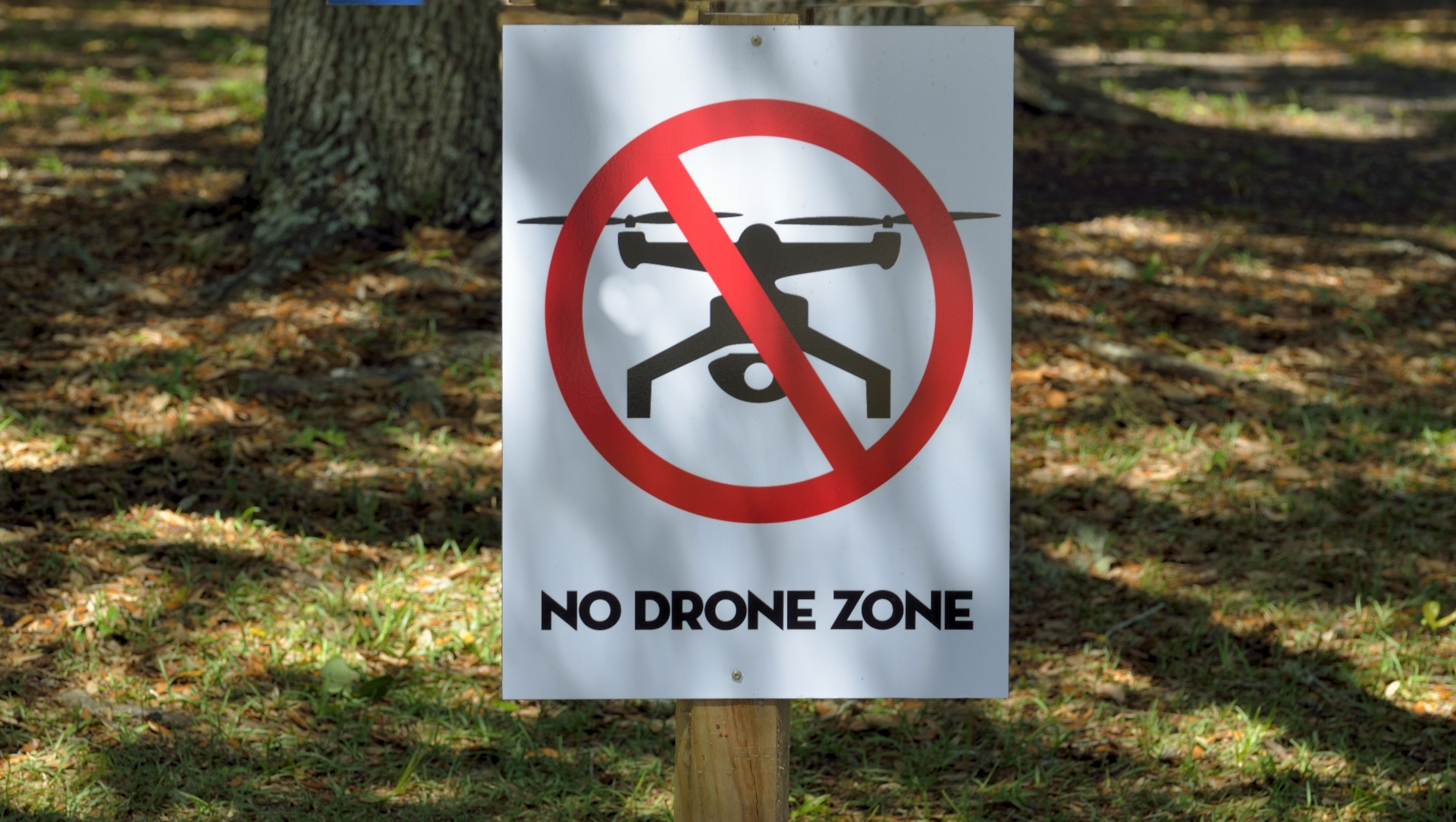
Signage prohibiting drone use

In the United States, the FAA regulations on drones only pertain to the physical safety of airspace and everything under it. Privacy regulation is not within the realm of the FAA; that is for state and local governments to decide. Drone regulations vary by country, by state, by region, and, in some cases, further, by city. In addition, many preserves, and all national parks, such as the Golden Gate National Recreation Area in California, do not allow drone use. Drone operators can download an app developed by the FAA called B4UFLY, which compiles the local laws and do not fly zones and makes them easily accessible, so an operator may clearly know where it is legal to operate their drone.

=== Resources for drone operators outside of the U.S. ===
Drone regulations are similar across different countries. Requirements include keeping the drone within the operator's line of sight at all times, flying only during daylight hours, not flying over crowds or events, not flying near airports or around "important facilities", including government buildings and nuclear plants.

The Australian government has created a mobile application for drone operators, called, Can I fly there? Similar to the app released by the FAA, it compiles laws and regulations so drone operators may know the rules in their current location.

The Canadian government is updating its drone laws, with tighter regulations going into effect June 1, 2019. These guidelines refer the drone operator to review the laws related to the criminal code, trespassing act, voyeurism and privacy laws, before flying. It is explicitly stated that drone operators must respect the privacy of others.

The Japanese government has similar regulations as the above. In addition, drone operators are requested to report incidents with drones, even if they do not affect others, such as crashes.

The UK Civil Aviation Authority created a website called Drone Safe, which compiles the regional and local laws for drone use in the country. They have also created a mobile application for drone operators, called Drone Assist. People in the UK are afforded a higher level of privacy, as the regulations state that a drone equipped with a camera must stay a specified distance away from people not associated with the operator.

== Legal examples ==
Most conservation work takes place over vast areas of land or sea, often spanning both public and private lands. People who live on or around these areas can have a reasonable expectation of privacy in their own private areas on these lands, such as their house, but are not afforded protection outside of their private areas. A drone operating in public airspace that is recording photos or videos with the intention of furthering conservation work, or law enforcement, has every right to do so.

A politician in Austria, who was expecting the privacy a forest would afford, trespassed onto land which was being monitored by a camera trap. His encounter with his partner was recorded, and drama ensued. The law sides with intent, in regard to human by-catch. The intent of those who run these recording systems is to further their research, conservation work, or law enforcement. If there is no intent to record people with nefarious motivation, and the cameras were not on private land, the camera trap operator would reasonably expect to be safe from prosecution.

From a legal perspective, the act of humans being caught in camera traps, acoustic recordings, and drones, when used for purposes other than recording people, is not wrong. The intention of the data holder, and what they do with that data is where legal privacy issues come in.

== See also ==
- Acoustic location
- Camera trap
- Conservation
- Unmanned aerial vehicle
- Legality of recording by civilians
- Privacy
- Wildlife conservation
- Wildlife observation
