= Secret photography =

Imaging or videoing an unaware subject

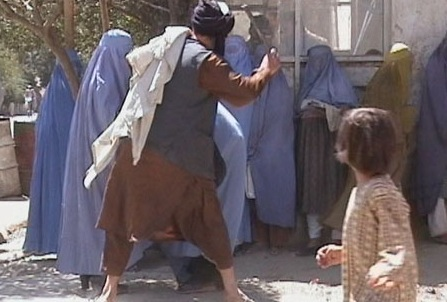
A still from a covertly taken video by RAWA showing Taliban members beating a woman in public

Secret photography is the use of an image or video recording device to photograph or film a person who is unaware that they are being intentionally photographed or filmed. It is sometimes called covert photography.

== Uses ==
A person may be unaware of being photographed in a variety of situations, such as:

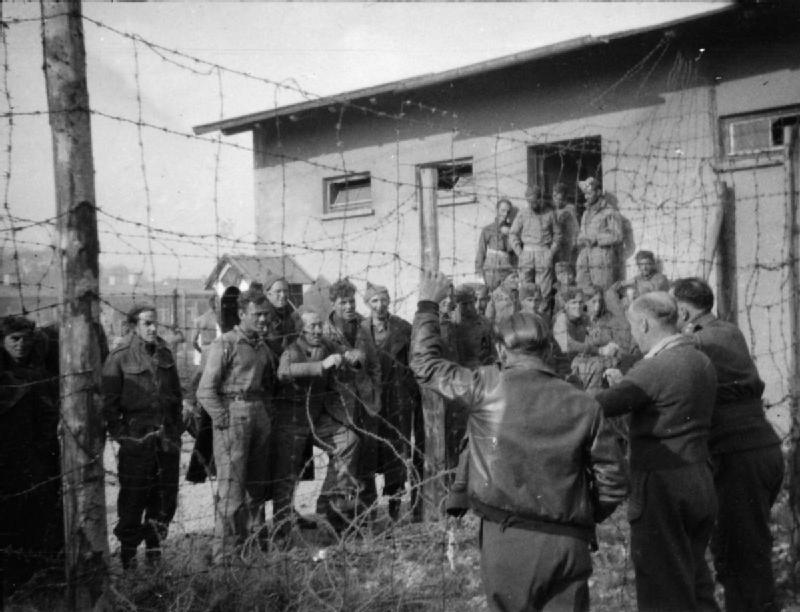
The British Army in North-west Europe 1944–45 (image taken covertly)

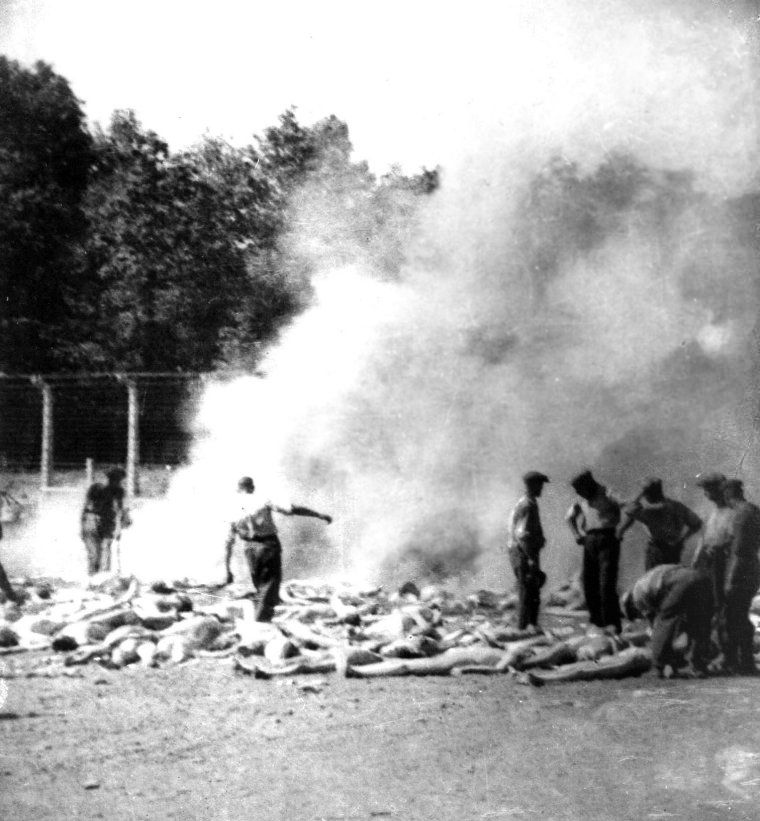
One of the Sonderkommando photographs

- Fixed or mobile closed-circuit television surveillance in public and private areas.
- Stalking by photographers of celebrities.
- Use of a hidden camera in investigative journalism.
- During industrial espionage.
- During intelligence gathering by police or private investigators.
- During the investigation phase of workman's compensation claim adjudication.
- By vigilantes.
- By political protesters or activists.
- By academics such as ethnographic researchers or participant observer sociologists.
- As a prank, e.g. from a friend's mobile camera phone.
- By voyeurs for sexual or other purposes

It has been in use by British police since intelligence gathering on the suffragette movement in the 1900s.

Some fine art photographers have displayed a fascination with the forms of secret voyeuristic photography. Voyeuristic photography has also been centrally explored in movies such as Powell & Pressburger's Peeping Tom, and Michelangelo Antonioni's Blowup, and has appeared to comic effect in films such as Gregory's Girl and American Pie.

== Technology ==
Sometimes normal cameras are used, but the photographer is concealed. Sometimes the camera itself is disguised or concealed. Some obvious element of concealment (or great distance) is generally needed to make such photography fall under the category of "secret photography" rather than street photography or documentary photography.

Erich Salomon took images of European summit meetings and a session of the US Supreme Court in secret using an Ermanox camera hidden in his hat. Some classic early U.S. street photography – such as that of Paul Strand on the Lower East Side – was obtained by fixing a second "dummy lens" to the camera, whereas the real shot was taken from the side. Although spy cameras small enough to fit inside a pocket watch had existed since the 1880s, since the 1950s advances in miniaturisation and electronics have greatly aided the ability to conceal miniature cameras, and the quality and affordability of tiny cameras (often called "spy cameras" or subminiature cameras) has now greatly increased. Some consumer compact digital cameras are now so small that in previous decades they would have qualified as "spy cameras", and digital cameras of 41 megapixels are now being embedded in some mobile camera phones. For larger cameras (DSLR or EVIL), right-angle mirror attachments are commercially available that, when mounted on long-focus lenses, can deceive the subject by producing the impression that the camera is pointed in a different direction.

== Laws and ethics ==
There are various personal privacy laws in different countries, which impact the secret photography of individuals and the publication of any resulting pictures. France for instance, has very strict laws against publication of such images, while the British tabloid press will publish a variety of secret photography. Examples in Britain include the publication of photos of Princess Diana secretly taken in a gym, and the publication of secretly taken photos of Naomi Campbell, which led to a major court case.

News gathering organisations and media trade unions issue ethical guidelines to their members on the use of secret and telephoto lens photography.

== See also ==
- Hidden camera
- Street photography
- Photojournalism
- Celebrity photography
- Surveillance
- Long focus lens
- Subminiature photography
- Candid photography
- Upskirt
