= Event photography =

Photography

Event photography is the practice of photographing guests and occurrences at any Event or occasion in which a photographer may be hired. This practice occurs around the world at occasions such as weddings, christenings, naming ceremonies, parties, birthdays, formals, dances, ceremonies, Awards ceremony, funerals, meals and engagements.

== History ==
Photography has been used to capture every kind of moment from its very beginning, but event photography really began when the first "portable" cameras were invented and persons (or professionals) could now carry around a camera and take photographs of moments as they happened as opposed to posing a set up and sitting for it.

== Photobooths for parties and events ==
Automatic photo booths predate their later use as event rentals. The Swiss Camera Museum states that Anatol Marco Josepho submitted a New York patent in 1924 and that the first public automatic photo booth was installed in New York in 1926; Getty notes that interest in rental photo booths for weddings, graduations and other large events grew in the United States in the early 2000s.

Every organizer of a party or event strives to make it unforgettable and vibrant. This is helped not only by decorations and entertainment, but also by small details. For example, a photobooth. Companies that provide photobooth rental services allow you to rent a photobooth for a short period of time (usually in hours) for a certain fee. Photobooth rentals became popular in the United States, primarily for wedding receptions, Sweet Sixteen parties, bar mitzvahs and bat mitzvahs, as well as for a growing number of other public and private events. In addition to the photobooth and printing an unlimited number of photo strips, rental companies typically provide an attendant who operates the photobooth and helps guests fill a guestbook with photo strips. Online image hosting, CDs with images, and related merchandise are readily available. Celebrities often use photobooths at parties.

In addition to traditional photo printing, modern photo booths can also include the following new features:

- Animated GIF
- Interactive book printing
- Virtual objects placed with consideration of a person’s eye or shoulder positions, etc.
- Slow-motion video
- Background removal using a green screen
- Fun virtual costume dress-up
- Games — mainly gesture-controlled games on Kinect, with a display of the person’s photo and his/her results.
- Facial gesture recognition

Entrepreneurs began renting out such devices at weddings and parties, and the idea spread. From 2005 to 2012, interest in photobooth rentals in the United States grew significantly. By 2016, in the 15 largest cities in North America, more people were searching for photobooth rental services than for DJ services. In Greater Los Angeles alone, there are now more than 600 photobooth rental companies. Photobooth rentals have also become popular in other countries such as Canada, Australia, and the United Kingdom. As of 2016, there are on average 226 000 photobooth searches worldwide each month. Since 2015, this figure has increased by 48,9% (in the United Kingdom alone, that is nearly 20 000 search queries per month).
