= Celebrity photography =

Type of photojournalism

Celebrity photography is a subset of photojournalism where the subjects are celebrities in the arts, sports and sometimes politics. There are three main types of celebrity photographs used by magazines and newspapers: event photography, celebrity portraiture, and paparazzi.

== Types ==
=== Event photography ===
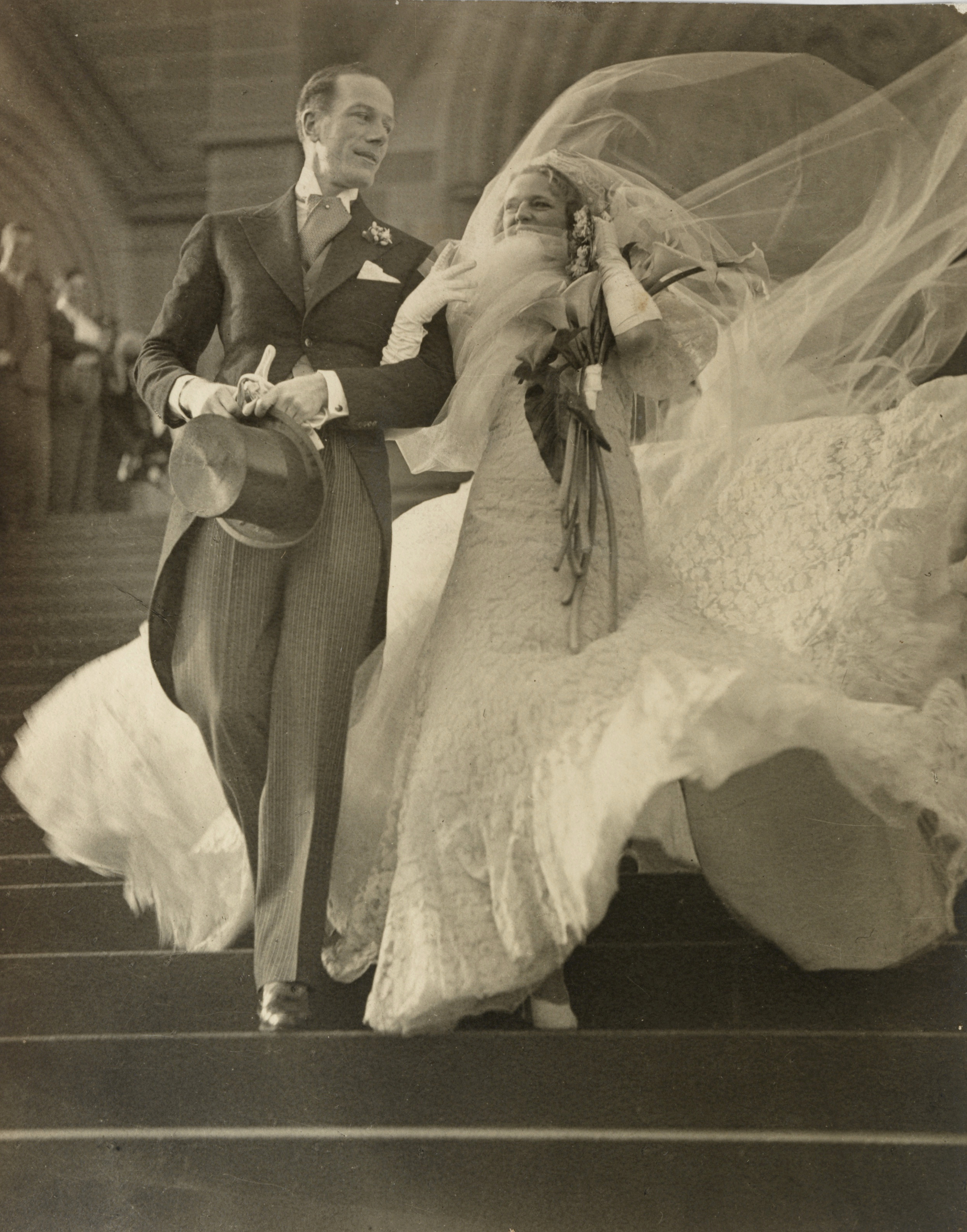
Celebrity wedding, of Madge Elliott and Cyril Ritchard at St Mary’s Cathedral, Sydney, 1935

Event photographers work celebrity-related events, such as film premieres, parties, and award shows. They also cover other events such as music festivals, wedding,s and private functions.

Controversy has surrounded event photography. One of the bigger controversies occurred in 2000 at the wedding of Catherine Zeta-Jones and Michael Douglas. The couple sued Hello! magazine for $800,000 after they printed photos from the couple's wedding. They claimed that Hello! invaded their privacy and damaged their careers. In 2003 the court in Douglas v Hello! Ltd ruled in favor of Zeta-Jones and Douglas.

Event photographers at red-carpet events have been known to sometimes shun certain celebrities. At first, they will boo the celebrity as a warning, and the second time, they will refuse to take pictures of the celebrity. This happens when the photographers are angry at the celebrity's actions. For example, if a celebrity decides not to stop for the photographers or doesn't acknowledge them, then that celebrity will be shunned. In recent years, stars such as George Clooney, Jennifer Lopez, and Sharon Stone have all been shunned.

=== Celebrity portraiture ===
Photographers may be assigned portrait sessions with celebrities, shot on location or in a photo studio.

=== Paparazzi ===
Paparazzi are photographers who shoot candid photos of celebrities with or without their consent, in the hope of capturing an exclusive image. Sometimes they resort to very long telephoto lens shots, or secret photography.

The paparazzi have a mostly negative reputation because they tend to do whatever it takes to capture the celebrities off guard. Celebrities have been known to tell the paparazzi about what they will be doing that day. Paris Hilton has said that the paparazzi have only helped her career, and that all publicity is good publicity.

Teenage Paparazzo is an HBO documentary directed by Adrian Grenier. The film is about the everyday life of Austin Visschedyk, a 14-year-old paparazzo. The film interviews many celebrities who talk about Visschedyk and the paparazzi as a whole. It also shows the relationships that Visschedyk has made with his fellow paparazzi. The documentary aired on HBO in 2010.

== Other forms of celebrity photography ==
Music photography is another form of celebrity photography. Most music photographers focus on capturing the energy of live music performances, and some also get to work backstage or on tour with bands.

== Works cited ==
- Mazin, Craig. "5 Things You Didn't Know About The Paparazzi." AskMen. N.p., n.d. Web. 7 February 2013. .
- Flores, Henry. "Paparazzo: Our Work Should Be Respected." Web log post. N.p., 3 January 2013. Web. .
- Dickson, Caitlin. "Paparazzi With Drones." Newsweek, 10 December 2012: 10–12. Academic Search Premier. Web.
- Howe, Peter. Paparazzi: And Our Obsession with Celebrity. New York: Artisan, 2005. Print.
