= Upskirt =

Image taken under a person's skirt

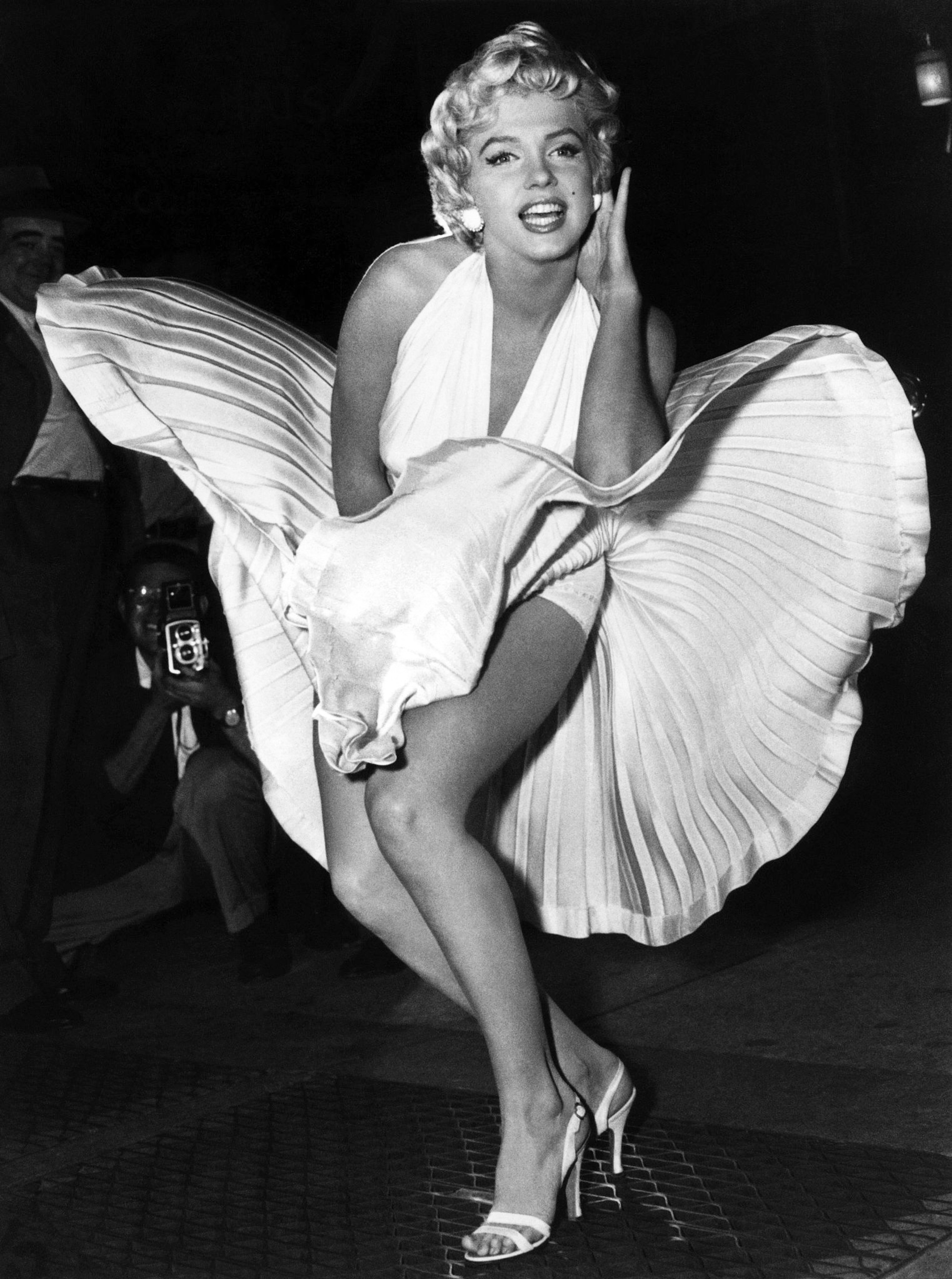
One of the most iconic pop culture images of the 20th century involves upskirting. Marilyn Monroe poses over a subway grate during the filming of The Seven Year Itch as her white dress is blown upwards by a train passing underneath.

Upskirting or upskirt photography is the practice of taking photographs or videos under a person's skirt or kilt, capturing an image or video of the crotch area, showing underwear such as panties, and sometimes genitalia. An "upskirt" is a photograph, video, or illustration which incorporates such an image, although the term may also be used to refer to the area of the body inside a skirt, usually from below and while being worn.

The practice is a form of sexual fetishism or voyeurism and is similar in nature to downblouse photography. The primary ethical and legal issue relating to upskirt photography in the United States is the reasonable expectation of privacy, even in a public place. In a few countries, nonconsensual upskirting is a criminal sexual offense.

== Social attitudes ==
The sudden popularity in the 1960s of the miniskirt brought the concept out onto the streets and was viewed by many as mass exhibitionism. One commentator in the 1960s said, "In European countries ... they ban mini-skirts in the streets and say they're an invitation to rape ..." By contrast, many women viewed the new style as rebellion against previous clothing styles and as women's liberation of their own bodies. For the first time, many women felt comfortable exposing their thighs, whether on the beach in a swimsuit or in street wear, and were even relaxed when in some situations their underwear would be visible.

Some upskirt and downblouse images are made with the knowledge and consent of the females affected. However, some of these images can end up being more widely distributed or being posted onto the Internet without the knowledge and consent of the subject, for example as revenge porn following a relationship breakup.

Attitudes hardened with the very widespread availability and use of digital photographic and video technology, most recently camera phones. Such technology was also being used to record upskirt and downblouse images for uploading onto the internet. Specialist websites came into existence where people could share such images, and terms such as "upskirt", "downblouse" and "nipple dress" (i.e., when an erect nipple is evident through the material of a woman's dress) came into use. Of particular concern were images of minors and of people who could be identified. Celebrities were popular victims of such efforts. Issues of privacy and reputation began to be raised.

The creation and viewing of this type of image came increasingly to be described as forms of voyeurism and pornography. This was not that most of such images were sexual in nature, with most of them being quite innocent by themselves, but because of their association with the nature of the website on which they were posted and because of the size of the collections.

== Safety shorts ==
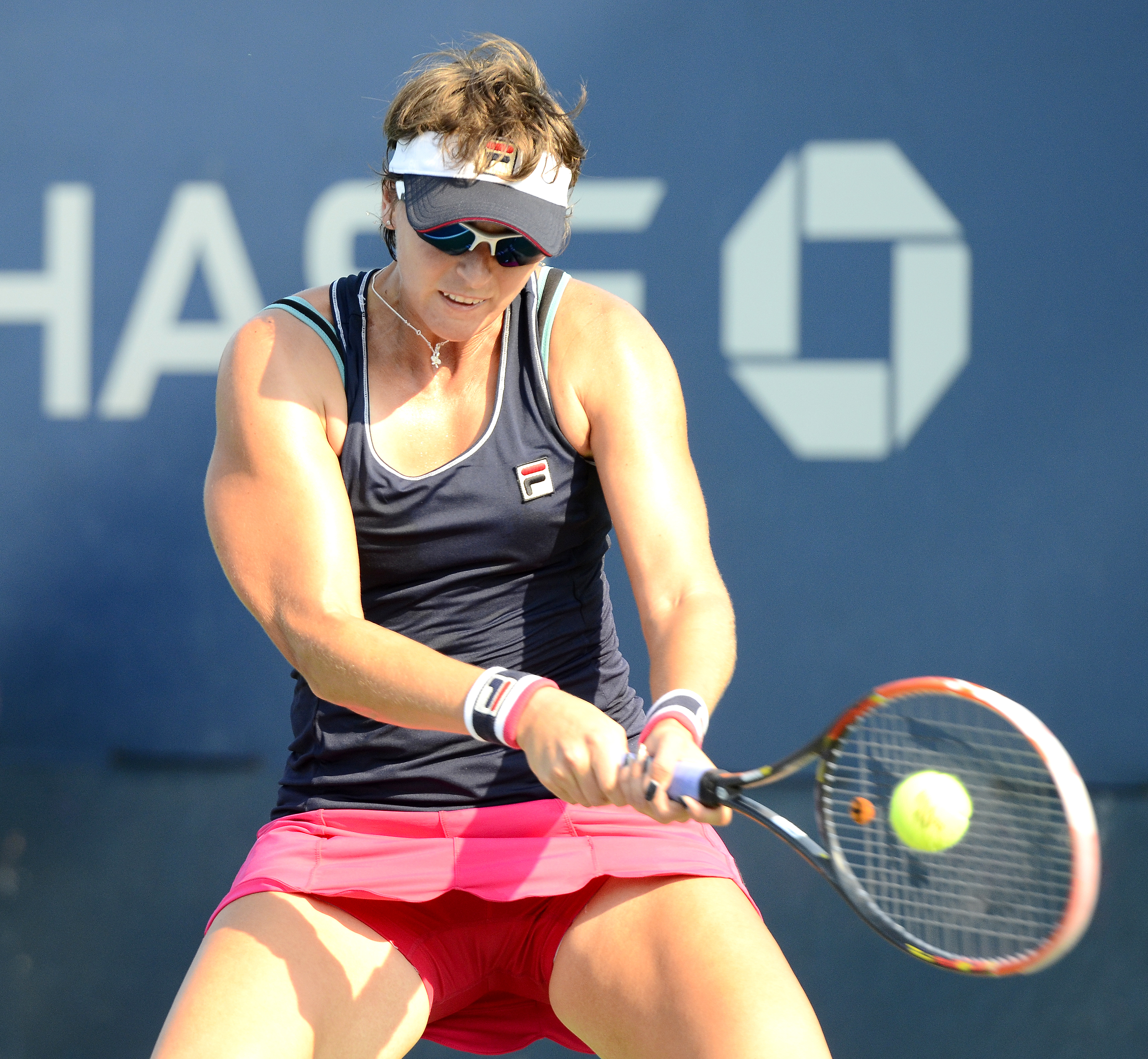
Professional tennis player Yaroslava Shvedova wearing safety shorts at a New York tennis match

Some skirt-wearers, particularly those who are prominently in public such as female athletes and celebrities as well as schoolgirls, wear "safety shorts" under their skirts to protect themselves from upskirting.

== Legality by country ==
Many countries do not have laws which protect a person's right to personal privacy, especially in a public place, but the legal position does vary considerably. The following is a list of countries that do have laws related to this subject.

=== Australia ===
All jurisdictions within Australia have passed laws making it illegal to take upskirt photos in public places without the person's consent.

=== Finland ===
In 2010, an elderly man had his camera confiscated and was fined 12 day-fines for the act of public obscenity (which was thought to be the closest match in the criminal code), having taken dozens of upskirt photos in a shopping centre in Turku.

=== France ===
In August of 2018, France passed its first law specifically criminalizing upskirt voyeurism, defined as "using any means in order to perceive the private parts of a person which that person... when committed without the knowledge or consent of the person". The law makes such offenses punishable by one year in prison and a fine of 15,000 euros.

=== Germany ===
In November 2019, the German Bundestag approved a bill to criminalize both upskirting and "criminalize photographing victims of accidents or pictures that" show a dead person in a grossly offensive way; German media has referred to the latter as rubbernecking.

=== India ===
In India, under section 66E, of the Information Technology Act, "Whoever, intentionally or knowingly captures, publishes or transmits the image of a private area of any person without their consent, under circumstances violating the privacy of that person, shall be punished with imprisonment which may extend to three years or with fine not exceeding two lakh (200,000) rupees, or with both". The words "private area" mean the naked or undergarment-clad genitals, pubic area, buttocks or female breast; "under circumstances violating privacy" means circumstances in which a person can have a reasonable expectation that any part of his or her private area would not be visible to the public, regardless of whether that person is in a public or private place.

=== Japan ===
In Japan, prefecture level Trouble Prevention Ordinances (迷惑防止条例) prohibit secret photography, along with stalking, chikan and other offenses. Although every prefecture in the country has adopted some variation of the ordinance, details vary greatly.

In June 2023, as a part of the sex crime reform, Japanese parliament passed a new law that replaces the prefecture-dependent implementations of Trouble Prevention Ordinances. Under the new law, the act of secretly photographing or filming a person's sexual appearance, as well as providing such photos or videos to a third person, are subject to imprisonment of up to three years or a fine of up to 3 million Japanese yen.

=== New Zealand ===
In New Zealand, it is illegal to make a visual recording of a person's intimate parts in any setting in which the person has a "reasonable expectation of privacy". This includes public and private settings. It is also illegal to possess or distribute such images.

=== South Korea ===
In South Korea, the Sexual Violence Punishment Act prohibits secret photography, the photographing of people without their permission. Such filming is subject to criminal penalties and results in those convicted being registered as sex offenders. This applies to activities such as upskirting and also to filming a clothed person from a long distance. If the person being photographed is a minor, the punishment is more severe. It is the filming, not the distribution, that constitutes the crime. When a person is photographed from a long distance, the court judges whether there is "sexual intention" or a "sexual body part" is photographed or "sexual shame" is the result. The law has been criticized for having no clear standards for legal interpretation. Some South Korean lawyers suggest that posting videos of street events such as Halloween on social media may constitute a sex crime.

=== United Kingdom ===
==== England and Wales ====
Since April 2019, upskirting has constituted the specific offence of voyeurism under the Sexual Offences Act 2003. It is defined as creating images of or operating equipment to view genitals, buttocks or underwear beneath clothing where they would not normally be visible, for the purpose of sexual gratification or to cause humiliation, alarm or distress. The maximum sentence for the offence is two years' imprisonment and in the more serious sexual cases those convicted are added to the Violent and Sex Offender Register.

Before 2019, there were no specific laws against upskirting in England and Wales. When upskirting took place in public, it was outside of the scope of the offence of voyeurism under the Sexual Offences Act 2003. Nevertheless, prosecutions for upskirting were successful under the common law offence of outraging public decency, which requires the presence of at least two other people and for the act to be done in a public place.

Following a public campaign to change the law, a government bill was introduced to the House of Commons on 21 June 2018. Speaking on the government's behalf in the House of Lords, Baroness Vere of Norbiton said the legislation would also protect men wearing kilts. The Voyeurism (Offences) Act 2019 received royal assent on 12 February 2019, taking effect two months later.

==== Scotland ====
Upskirting is a specific offence in Scotland under the Criminal Justice and Licensing (Scotland) Act 2010. This act, which was passed by the Scottish Parliament, extended the definition of voyeurism to cover upskirting.

==== Northern Ireland ====
As in England and Wales before 2019, there is no specific offence of upskirting in Northern Ireland, but can in certain circumstances be prosecuted as the common law offence of outraging public decency.

=== United States ===
In the United States, laws vary by state. At the federal level the United States enacted the Video Voyeurism Prevention Act of 2004 to punish those who intentionally make an image of an individual's private areas without consent, when the person knew the subject had an expectation of privacy. This act applies only in areas under federal jurisdiction.

Additionally, many state laws address the issue as well.

A 2005 Illinois law made it a crime to videotape or transmit upskirt videos of other people without their consent. A 2014 Chicago ordinance made the crime punishable by a $500 fine.

In March 2014, the Massachusetts Supreme Judicial Court overruled a lower court upskirt ruling because the women photographed were not nude or partially nude, saying that existing so-called Peeping Tom laws protect people from being photographed in dressing rooms and bathrooms when nude or partially nude, but it does not protect clothed people in public areas. A law was then passed in Massachusetts to ban the practice.

In September 2014, the Texas Court of Criminal Appeals voided the state's statute against "improper photography or visual recording" including "upskirt" photos, saying its wording was overly broad. The court's opinion stated: "Protecting someone who appears in public from being the object of sexual thoughts seems to be the sort of 'paternalistic interest in regulating the defendant's mind' that the First Amendment was designed to guard against."

== See also ==
- Anasyrma
- Legality of recording by civilians
- Skort
- Panchira
