= Krouse =

Krouse is a surname. Notable people with the surname include:

- Bob Krouse (born 1943), Canadian football player
- Ray Krouse (1927–1966), American football player
- P. J. Krouse (1877–1944), American architect
- Rodger Krouse (born 1961), American businessman

== See also ==
- Krouse v. Graham, United States tort case law
- Krouse v. Chrysler Canada Ltd., Canadian copyright case law
