= Street photography =

Photography genre

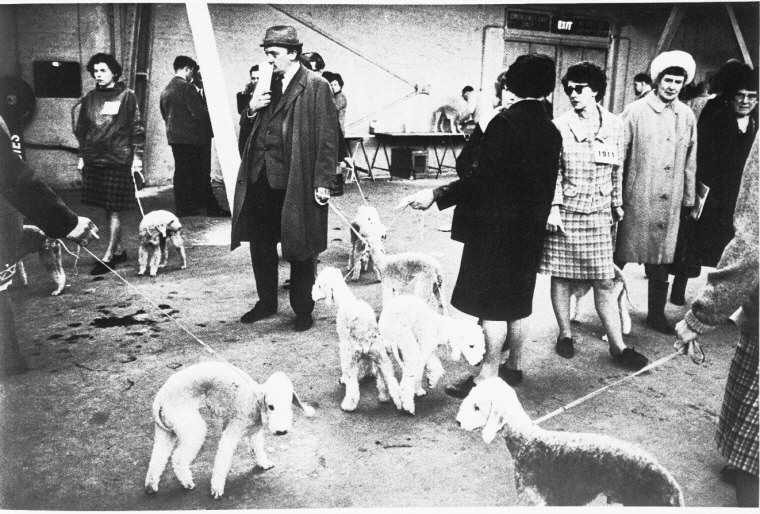
"Crufts Dog Show 1968" by Tony Ray-Jones

Street photography is photography conducted for art or inquiry that features unmediated chance encounters and random incidents within public places. It usually has the aim of capturing images at a decisive or poignant moment by careful framing and timing. Street photography overlaps widely with candid photography, although the latter can also be used in other settings, such as portrait photography and event photography.

Street vendor at work.

Street photography does not necessitate the presence of a street or even the urban environment. Though people usually feature directly, street photography might be absent of people and can be of an object or environment where the image projects a decidedly human character in facsimile or aesthetic.

The photographer is an armed version of the solitary walker reconnoitering, stalking, cruising the urban inferno, the voyeuristic stroller who discovers the city as a landscape of voluptuous extremes. Adept of the joys of watching, connoisseur of empathy, the flâneur finds the world "picturesque".

— Susan Sontag, 1977

Street photography can focus on people and their behavior in public. In this respect, the street photographer is similar to social documentary photographers or photojournalists who also work in public places, but with the aim of capturing newsworthy events. Any of these photographers' images may capture people and property visible within or from public places, which often entails navigating ethical issues and laws of privacy, security, and property.

Much of what is regarded, stylistically and subjectively, as definitive street photography was made in the era spanning the end of the 19th century through to the late 1970s, a period which saw the emergence of portable cameras that enabled candid photography in public places.

== History ==
Depictions of everyday public life form a genre in almost every period of world art, beginning in the pre-historic, Sumerian, Egyptian and early Buddhist art periods. Art dealing with the life of the street, whether within views of cityscapes, or as the dominant motif, appears in the West in the canon of the Northern Renaissance, Baroque, Rococo, of Romanticism, Realism, Impressionism and Post-Impressionism. With the type having been so long established in other media, it followed that photographers would also pursue the subject as soon as technology enabled them.

=== Nineteenth-century precursors ===
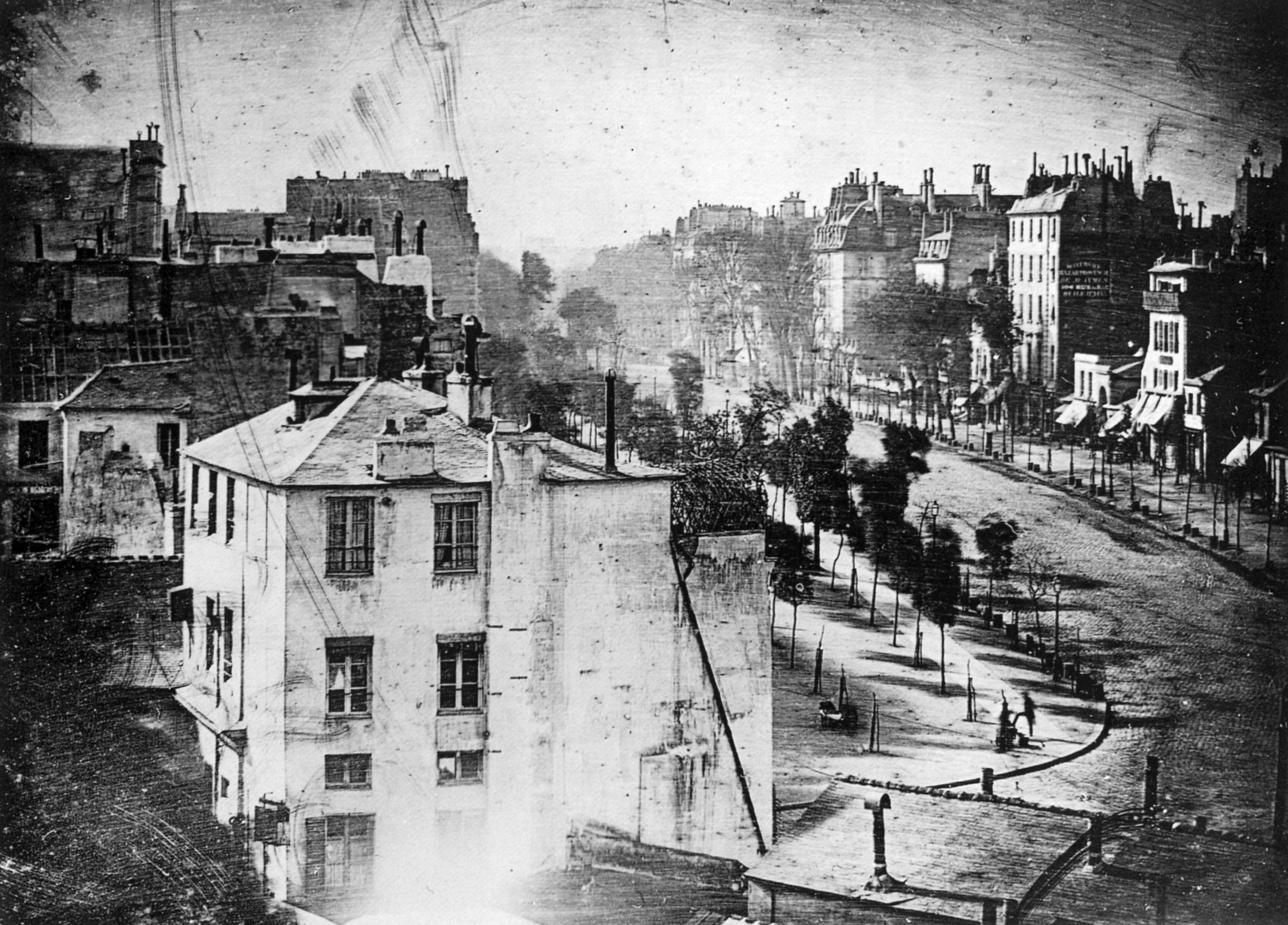
Louis Daguerre: "Boulevard du Temple" (1838 or 1839)

In 1838 or 1839 the first photograph of figures in the street was recorded by Louis-Jacques-Mandé Daguerre in one of a pair of daguerreotype views taken from his studio window of the Boulevard du Temple in Paris. The second, made at the height of the day, shows an unpopulated stretch of street, while the other was taken at about 8:00 am, and as Beaumont Newhall reports, "The Boulevard, so constantly filled with a moving throng of pedestrians and carriages was perfectly solitary, except an individual who was having his boots brushed. His feet were compelled, of course, to be stationary for some time, one being on the box of the boot black, and the other on the ground. Consequently his boots and legs were well defined, but he is without body or head, because these were in motion."

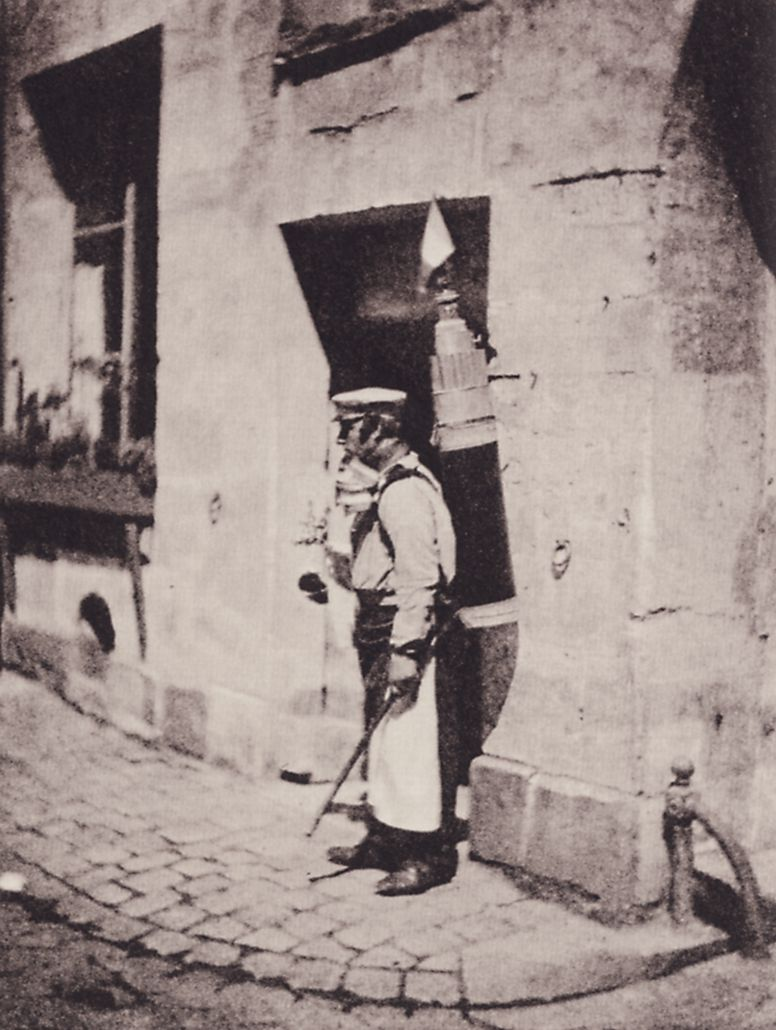
Charles Nègre, waterseller

Charles Nègre was the first photographer to attain the technical sophistication required to register people in movement on the street in Paris in 1851. Photographer John Thomson, a Scotsman working with journalist and social activist Adolphe Smith, published Street Life in London in twelve monthly installments starting in February 1877. Thomson played a key role in making everyday life on the streets a significant subject for the medium.

Eugene Atget is regarded as a progenitor, not because he was the first of his kind, but as a result of the popularisation in the late 1920s of his record of Parisian streets by Berenice Abbott, who was inspired to undertake a similar documentation of New York City. As the city developed, Atget helped to promote Parisian streets as a worthy subject for photography. From the 1890s to the 1920s he mainly photographed its architecture, stairs, gardens, and windows. He did photograph some workers, but people were not his main interest.

First sold in 1925, the Leica was the first commercially successful camera to use 35 mm film. Its compactness and bright viewfinder, matched to lenses of quality (changeable on Leicas sold from 1930) helped photographers move through busy streets and capture fleeting moments.

=== Twentieth-century practitioners ===
==== United Kingdom ====
Paul Martin is considered a pioneer, making candid unposed photographs of people in London and at the seaside in the late 19th and early 20th century in order to record life. Martin is the first recorded photographer to do so in London with a disguised camera.

Mass-Observation was a social research organisation founded in 1937 which aimed to record everyday life in Britain and to record the reactions of the 'man-in-the-street' to King Edward VIII's abdication in 1936 to marry divorcée Wallis Simpson, and the succession of George VI. Humphrey Spender made photographs on the streets of the northern English industrial town of Bolton, identified for the project's publications as "Yorktown", while filmmaker Humphrey Jennings made a cinematic record in London for a parallel branch of investigation. The chief Mass-Observationists were anthropologist Tom Harrisson in Bolton and poet Charles Madge in London, and their first report was produced as the book "May the Twelfth: Mass-Observation Day-Surveys 1937 by over two hundred observers"

==== France ====
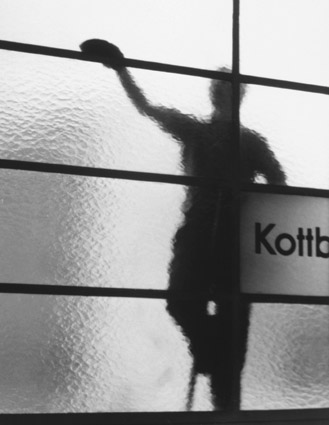
Window cleaner at Kottbusser Tor, Berlin, by Elsa Thiemann c. 1946

The post-war French Humanist School photographers found their subjects on the street or in the bistro. They worked primarily in black‐and‐white in available light with the popular small cameras of the day, discovering what the writer Pierre Mac Orlan (1882–1970) called the "fantastique social de la rue" (social fantastic of the street) and their style of image-making rendered romantic and poetic the way of life of ordinary European people, particularly in Paris. Between 1946 and 1957 Le Groupe des XV annually exhibited work of this kind.

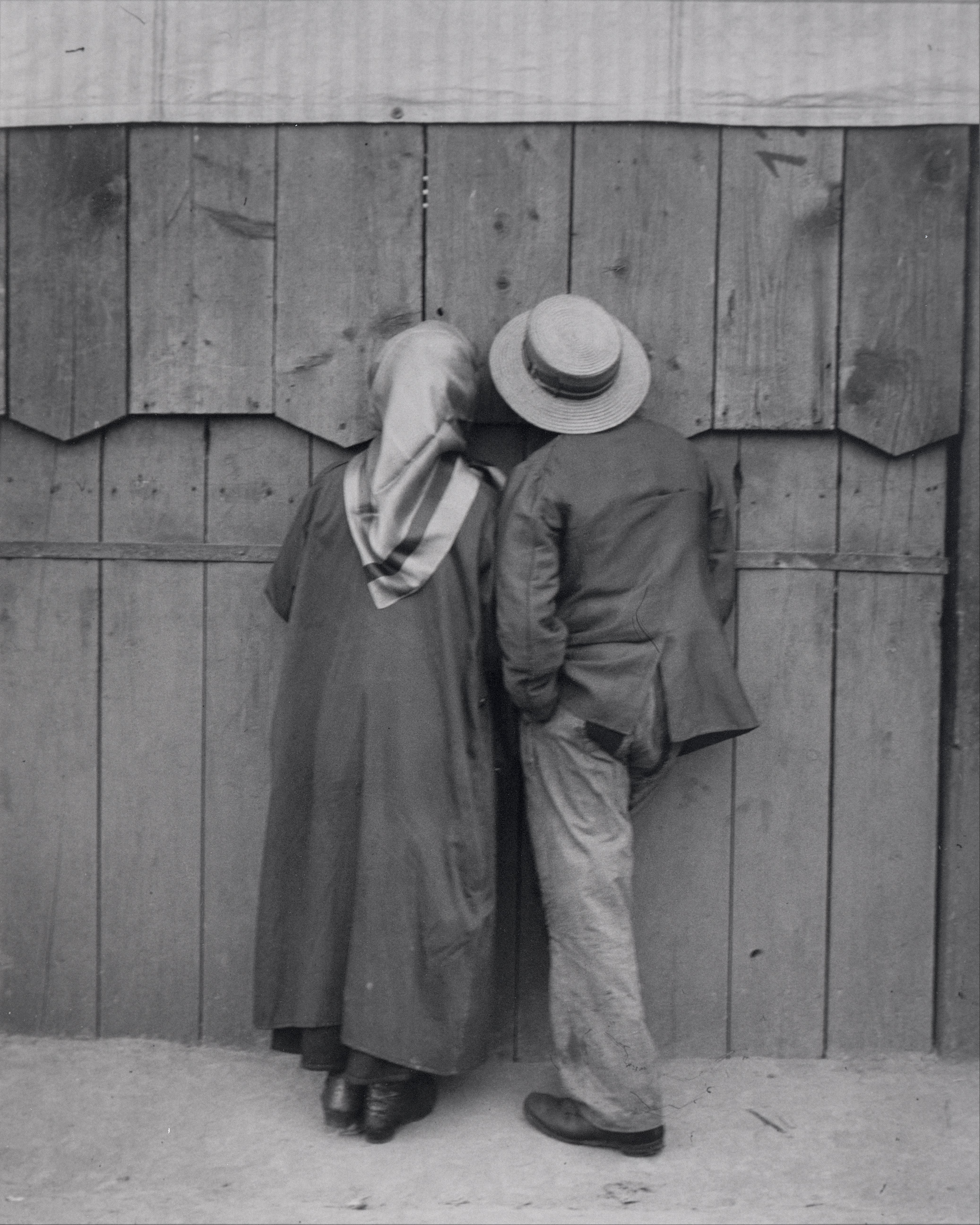
André Kertész, Circus, Budapest, 19 May 1920

Street photography formed the major content of two exhibitions at the Museum of Modern Art (MoMA) in New York curated by Edward Steichen, Five French Photographers: Brassai; Cartier-Bresson, Doisneau, Ronis, Izis in 1951 to 1952, and Post-war European Photography in 1953, which exported the concept of street photography internationally. Steichen drew on large numbers of European humanist and American humanistic photographs for his 1955 exhibition The Family of Man, proclaimed as a compassionate portrayal of a global family, which toured the world, inspiring photographers in the depiction of everyday life.

Henri Cartier-Bresson's widely admired Images à la Sauvette (1952) (the English-language edition was titled The Decisive Moment) promoted the idea of taking a picture at what he termed the "decisive moment"; "when form and content, vision and composition merged into a transcendent whole". His book inspired successive generations of photographers to make candid photographs in public places before this approach per se came to be considered déclassé in the aesthetics of postmodernism.

==== America ====
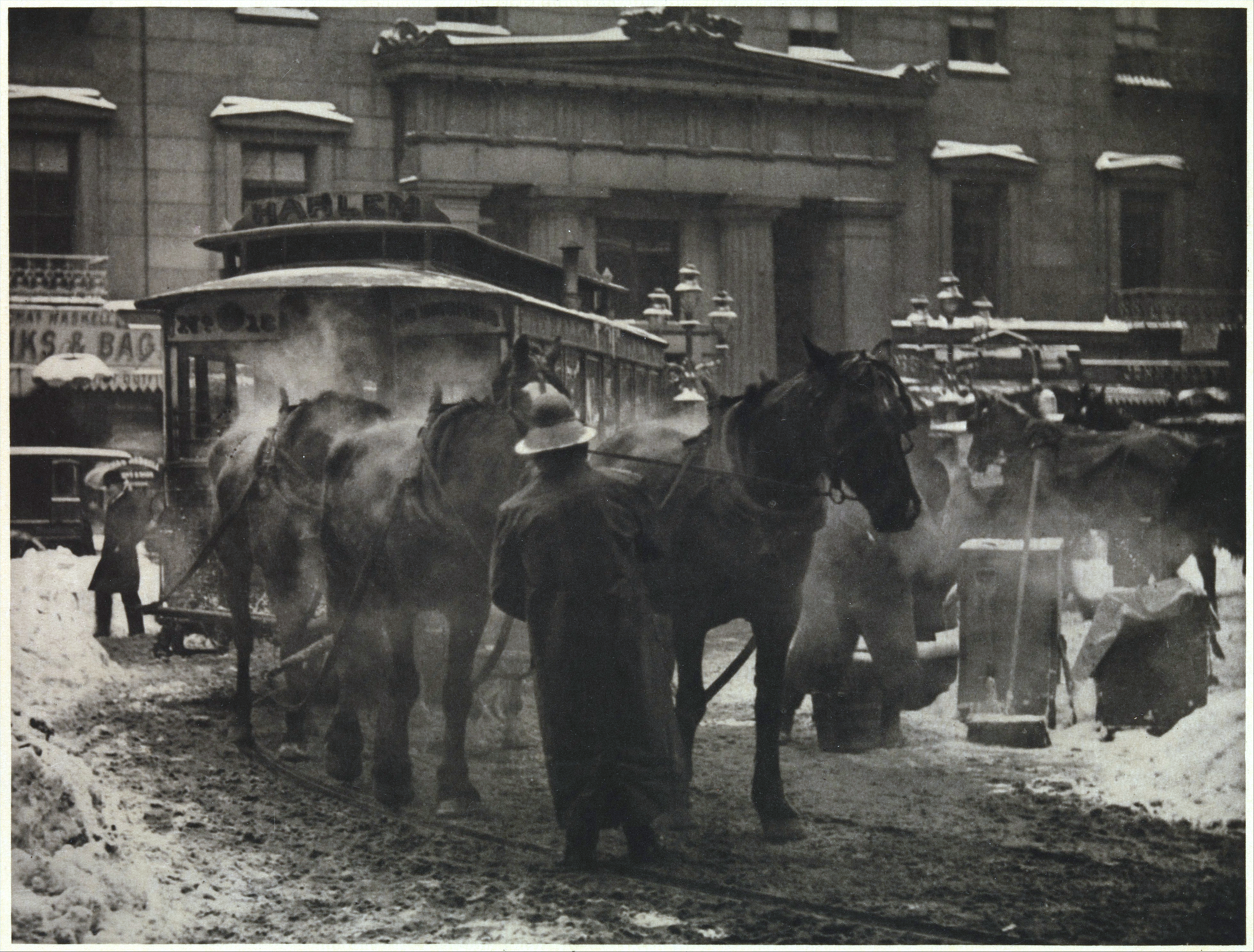
Alfred Stieglitz: "The Terminal" (1892)

Walker Evans worked from 1938 to 1941 on a series in the New York City Subway in order to practice a pure 'record method' of photography; candid portraits of people who would unconsciously come 'into range before an impersonal fixed recording machine during a certain time period'. The recording machine was 'a hidden camera', a 35 mm Contax concealed beneath his coat, that was 'strapped to the chest and connected to a long wire strung down the right sleeve'. However, his work had little contemporary impact as due to Evans' sensitivities about the originality of his project and the privacy of his subjects, it was not published until 1966, in the book Many Are Called, with an introduction written by James Agee in 1940. The work was exhibited as Walker Evans Subway Photographs and Other Recent Acquisitions held at the National Gallery of Art, 1991–1992, accompanied by the catalogue Walker Evans: Subways and Streets.

Helen Levitt, then a teacher of young children, associated with Evans in 1938–39. She documented the transitory chalk drawings that were part of children's street culture in New York at the time, as well as the children who made them. In July 1939, MoMA's new photography section included Levitt's work in its inaugural exhibition. In 1943, Nancy Newhall curated her first solo exhibition Helen Levitt: Photographs of Children there. The photographs were ultimately published in 1987 as In The Street: chalk drawings and messages, New York City 1938–1948.

The beginnings of street photography in the United States can also be linked to those of jazz, both emerging as outspoken depictions of everyday life. This connection is visible in the work of the New York school of photography (not to be confused with the New York School). The New York school of photography was not a formal institution, but rather comprised groups of photographers in the mid-20th century based in New York City.

Robert Frank's 1958 book, The Americans, was significant; raw and often out of focus, Frank's images questioned mainstream photography of the time, "challenged all the formal rules laid down by Henri Cartier-Bresson and Walker Evans" and "flew in the face of the wholesome pictorialism and heartfelt photojournalism of American magazines like LIFE and Time". Although the photo-essay format was formative in his early years in Switzerland, Frank rejected it: "I wanted to follow my own intuition and do it my way, and not make any concession – not make a Life story'. Even the work of Cartier-Bresson he regarded as insufficiently subjective: "I've always thought it was terribly important to have a point of view, and I was also sort of disappointed in him [Cartier-Bresson] that that was never in his pictures'.

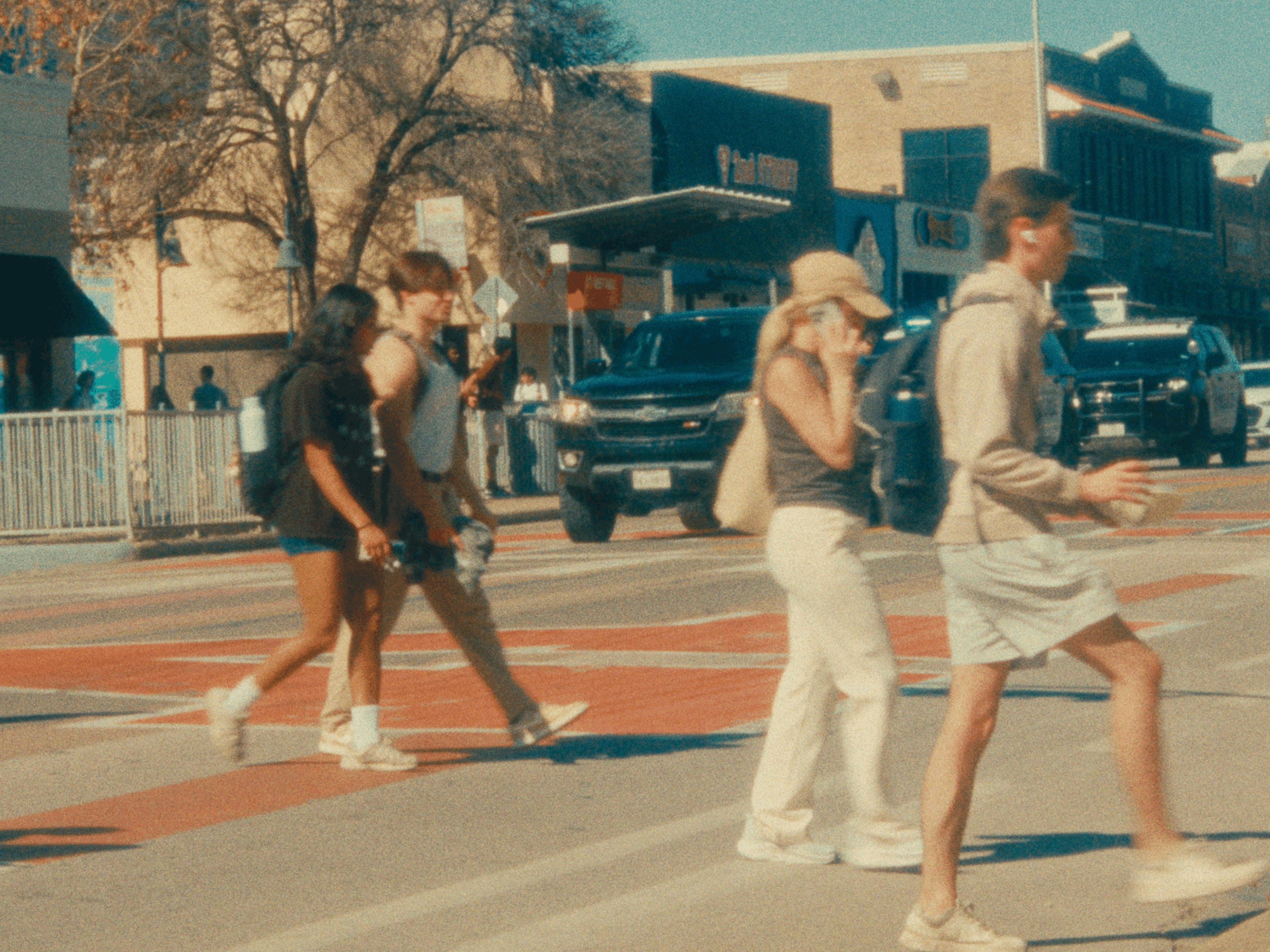
Shesahumann : "Pitter-Pat Upon The Pavement" (2026)

Frank's work thus epitomises the subjectivity of postwar American photography, as John Szarkowski prominently argued; "Minor White's magazine Aperture and Robert Frank's book The Americans were characteristic of the new work of their time in the sense that they were both uncompromisingly committed to a highly personal vision of the world". His claim for subjectivism is widely accepted, resulting more recently in Patricia Vettel-Becker's perspective on postwar street photography as highly masculine and centred on the male body, and Lili Corbus Benzer positioning Robert Frank's book as negatively prioritising 'personal vision' over social activism. Mainstream photographers in America fiercely rejected Frank's work, but the book later "changed the nature of photography, what it could say and how it could say it". It was a stepping stone for fresh photographers looking to break away from the restrictions of the old style and "remains perhaps the most influential photography book of the 20th century". Szarkowski's recognition of Frank's subjectivity led him to promote more street photography in America, such as his curation of the 1967 New Documents exhibition featuring Diane Arbus, Lee Friedlander and Garry Winogrand or of Mark Cohen's work in 1973. Both at the Museum of Modern Art (MoMA).

=== Individual approaches in the later twentieth and early twenty-first centuries ===
Inspired by Frank, in the 1960s Garry Winogrand, Lee Friedlander and Joel Meyerowitz began photographing on the streets of New York. Phil Coomes, writing for BBC News in 2013, said "For those of us interested in street photography there are a few names that stand out and one of those is Garry Winogrand"; critic Sean O'Hagan, writing in The Guardian in 2014, said "In the 1960s and 70s, he defined street photography as an attitude as well as a style – and it has laboured in his shadow ever since, so definitive are his photographs of New York."

Returning to the UK in 1965 from the US where he had met Winogrand and adopted street photography, Tony Ray-Jones turned a wry eye on often surreal groupings of British people on their holidays or participating in festivals. The acerbic comic vein of Ray-Jones' high-contrast monochromes, which before his premature death were popularized by Creative Camera (for which he conducted an interview with Brassaï), is mined more recently by Martin Parr in hyper-saturated colour.

== Characteristics and Distinctions ==
Street photography is a vast genre that can be defined in many ways, but it is often characterized by the spontaneous capturing of an unrepeatable, fleeting moment, often of the everyday going-ons of strangers. It is classically shot with wider angle lenses (e.g. 35mm) and usually features urban environments.

=== Street photography versus documentary photography ===
Street photography and documentary photography are similar genres of photography that often overlap while having distinct individual qualities.

Documentary photographers typically have a defined, premeditated message and an intention to record particular events in history. The gamut of the documentary approach encompasses aspects of journalism, art, education, sociology and history. In social investigation, documentary images are often intended to provoke, or to highlight the need for, societal change. Conversely, street photography is reactive and disinterested by nature and motivated by curiosity or creative inquiry, allowing it to deliver a relatively neutral depiction of the world that mirrors society, "unmanipulated" and with usually unaware subjects.

=== Candid street photography versus street portraits ===
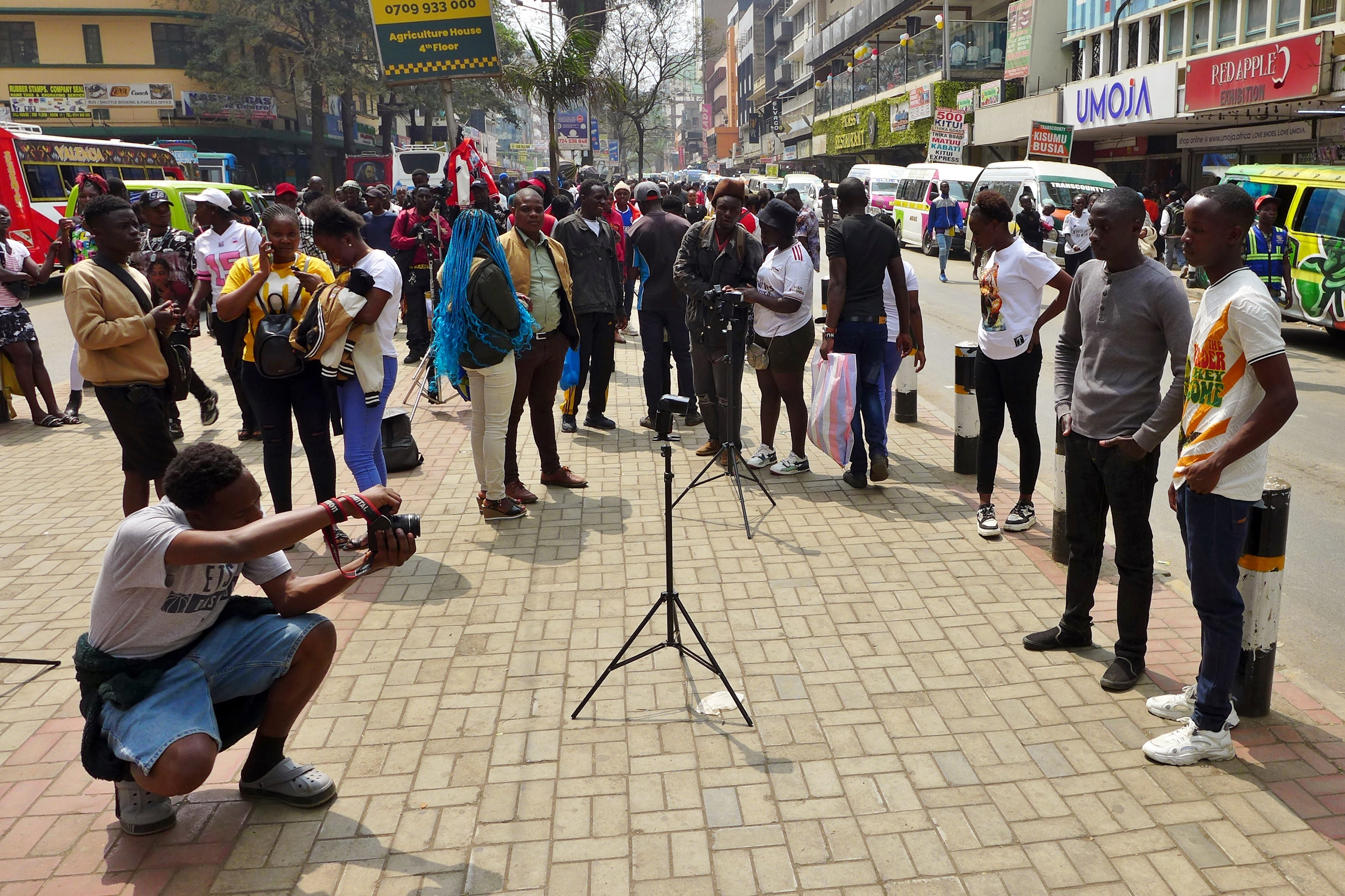
Candid photo of posed street portrait making, Nairobi (2025)

Street photography is generally seen as unposed and candid, but there are a few street photographers who interact with strangers on the streets and take their portraits. Street portraits are unplanned portraits taken of strangers while out doing street photography, however they are seen as posed because there is interaction with the subject.

== Legal concerns ==
The issue of street photographers taking photographs of strangers in public places without their consent (i.e. 'candid photography' by definition) for fine art purposes has been controversial. Photographing people and places in public is legal in most countries protecting freedom of expression and journalistic freedom. There are usually limits on how photos of people may be used and most countries have specific laws regarding people's privacy.

Street photography may also conflict with laws that were originally established to protect against paparazzi, defamation, or harassment and special laws will sometimes apply when taking pictures of minors.

=== Canada ===
While the common-law provinces follow the United Kingdom, with respect to the freedom to take pictures in a public place, Quebec law provides that, in most circumstances, their publication can take place only with the consent of the subjects therein.

=== European Union ===
The European Convention on Human Rights establishes in a right to privacy. This can result in restrictions on the publication of photography. The right to privacy is protected by Article 8 of the convention. In the context of photography, it stands at odds to the Article 10 right of freedom of expression. As such, courts will usually consider the public interest in balancing the rights through the legal test of proportionality.

=== France ===
While also limiting photography in order to protect privacy rights, street photography can still be legal in France when pursued as an art form under certain circumstances. While in one prominent case the freedom of artistic expression trumped the individual's right to privacy, the legality will much depend on the individual case.

=== Germany ===
Germany protects the right to take photos in public, but also recognizes a "right to one's own picture". That means that even though pictures can often be taken without someone's consent, they must not be published without the permission of the person in the picture. The law also protects specifically against defamation.

This right to one's picture, however, does not extend to people who are not the main focus of the picture (e.g. who just wandered into a scene), or who are not even recognizable in the photo. It also does not usually extend to people who are public figures (e.g. politicians or celebrities).

If a picture is considered art, the courts will also consider the photographer's freedom of artistic expression; meaning that "artful" street photography can still be legally published in certain cases.

=== Greece ===
Production, publication and non-commercial sale of street photography is legal in Greece, without the need to have the consent of the shown person or persons. In Greece the right to take photographs and publish them or sell licensing rights over them as fine art or editorial content is protected by the Constitution of Greece (Article 14 and other articles) and free speech laws as well as by case law and legal cases. Photographing the police and publishing the photographs is also legal.

Photography and video-taking is also permitted across the whole Athens Metro transport network, which is very popular among Greek street photographers.

=== Hungary ===
In Hungary, from 15 March 2014 anyone taking photographs is technically breaking the law if someone wanders into shot, under a new civil code that outlaws taking pictures without the permission of everyone in the photograph. This expands the law on consent to include the taking of photographs, in addition to their publication.

=== Japan ===
In Japan permission, or at least signification of intent to photo and the absence of refusal, is needed both for photography and for publication of photos of recognisable people even in public places. 'Hidden photography' (kakushidori hidden, surreptitious photography) 'stolen photography' (tōsatsu with no intention of getting permission) and "fast photography' (hayayori before permission and refusal can be given) are forbidden unless in the former permission is obtained from the subject immediately after taking the photo. People have rights to their images (shōzōken, image rights). The law is especially strict when that which is taken, or the taking, is in any sense shameful. Exception is made for photos of famous people in public places and news photography by registered news media outlets where favour is given to the public right to know.

=== South Africa ===
In South Africa, photographing people in public is legal. Reproducing and selling photographs of people is legal for editorial and limited fair use commercial purposes. There exists no case law to define what the limits on commercial use are. Civil law requires the consent of any identifiable persons for advertorial and promotional purposes. Property, including animals, do not enjoy any special consideration.

=== South Korea ===
In South Korea, taking photos or videos of women in public places wearing revealing clothing or outfits that expose their body lines (e.g., swimsuit, leggings, skinny jeans, hot pants, etc.) without their consent, is punishable by law as a sexual crime, even it's not upskirting. Article 14 of the "Act on Special Cases Concerning the Punishment, etc. of Sexual Crimes" (성폭력범죄의 처벌 등에 관한 특례법) defines a person subject to punishment for filming as "a person who takes photos of another person's body, which may cause any sexual stimulus or shame against the latter's will, by using a camera or similar mechanism, or who distributes, sells, leases, provides, or openly exhibits or screens the resulting photographs/videos". Distribution or possession is punishable by up to 7 years in prison or a fine of up to 50 million won.

In addition to this, there exists a concept called portrait rights (초상권), which is similar to Japan's shōzōken, where distribution of images of another person's face, requires the subject's consent. Portrait rights states that a photo of a person's face or other physical features that can identify them cannot be used for commercial purposes such as in advertisements.

=== United Kingdom ===
The United Kingdom has enacted domestic law in accordance with the Human Rights Act, which limits the publication of certain photographs in the context of the news media. However, as a general rule, the taking of photographs of other people, including children, in a public place is legal, whether or not the person consents.

In terms of photographing property, in general under UK law one cannot prevent photography of private property from a public place, and in general the right to take photographs on private land upon which permission has been obtained is similarly unrestricted. However, landowners are permitted to impose any conditions they wish upon entry to a property, such as forbidding or restricting photography. There are however nuances to these broad principles, and even where photography is restricted as a condition of entry, the landowner's remedies for a breach will usually be limited to asking the photographer to leave the premises. They cannot confiscate cameras or memory cards nor can they require photographs be deleted.

=== United States ===
In the US, the protection of free speech is generally interpreted widely, and encompasses art speech, including photography. As such, street photography is exempt from right to privacy claims.

For example, the case Nussenzweig v. DiCorcia established that taking, publishing and selling street photography (including street portraits) is legal, even without the consent of the person being portrayed, because photography is protected as free speech and art by the First Amendment. However, the Court of Appeals for the State of New York upheld the Nussenzweig decision solely on the basis of the statute of limitations expiring and did not address the free speech and First Amendment arguments.

Street photography is additionally protected by court precedent. As courts regularly uphold that individuals have no right to privacy in public places, there is little, if any, legal action that can be taken against a street photographer.

== Ethical concerns ==
Street photography's nonconsensual nature can raise concerns about privacy and autonomy.

=== Privacy ===
An invasion of privacy occurs when an individual's right to privacy is infringed upon by unwelcome intrusion into their private life, including public disclosure of private information. While a person may lose their reasonable expectation of privacy when going out in public according to court precedent, some feel that individuals should be able to control their information (such as their image) even in public. These critics would contend that it cannot be said that every person in public accepts the possibility of being photographed because assumption of risk is based on conscious consent, and might also argue that a photograph's ability to accentuate details means that it does more than just record what the public sees.

=== Autonomy ===
As the right to privacy can be seen as protecting representations of oneself and since nonconsensual use of an individual's image in street photography denies the subject control of the final image, some view street photography as taking away autonomy. When a person is not asked for consent to use their picture, they do not get to decide whether or where the picture is published or how it is viewed.

== See also ==
- List of street photographers
- Legality of recording by civilians
- People watching
- Personality rights
