= Athans v Canadian Adventure Camps Ltd =

Canadian legal case

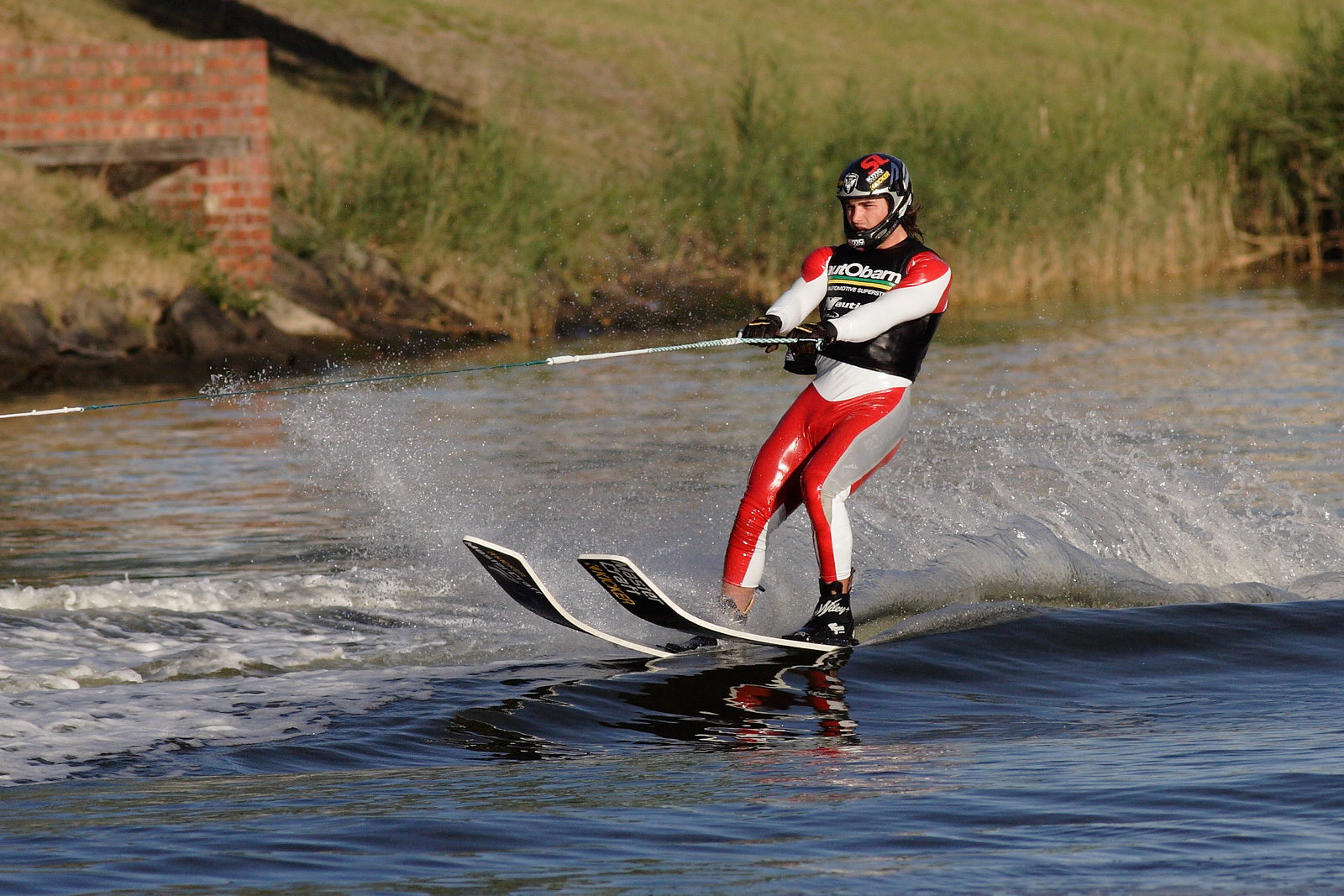
- Court: Ontario Superior Court of Justice
- Decided: 9 November 1977
- Citations: 1977 CanLII 1255 (ON SC); 17 OR (2d) 425; 80 DLR (3d) 583

Case opinions
- Decision by: Henry J

Athans v Canadian Adventure Camps Ltd, 1977 CanLII 1255, 17 OR (2d) 425, 80 DLR (3d) 583, is an appropriation of personality case in Canada, which recognized the right of exclusive right to market one's personality.

== Facts ==
Canadian Adventure Camps Limited ("CAC") operated a summer camp for children. In 1975, the camp opened for its first season on a commercial basis, featuring water-skiing as part of its programme. For promotional purposes, it published a brochure and an advertisement containing a graphic representation of a water-skier.

Athans was a professional athlete who was known for his prowess in water-skiing, both in Canada and internationally, and he promoted his image, expertise, and personality commercially. He claimed that the image in the brochure was identifiable with him, and was used for commercial purposes without his consent. The drawings used in the brochure and the advertisement were based upon a photograph of the plaintiff in the act of water-skiing, and were made by the second defendant, Ideas Diversified Limited ("IDL"), which prepared the promotional material for CAC.

The plaintiff claimed against both defendants damages for passing off and for wrongful appropriation of the plaintiff's personality; and, in the alternative, compensation for use of his image and personality. The defendants stated that prospective customers seeing the drawings could not recognize them as the plaintiff, and would not associate the plaintiff with the camp; that no passing off was intended or accomplished and that, in any event, the plaintiff suffered no injury or damage as a result.

== Opinion of the Court ==
At trial, Henry J ruled:

- No case of passing off was made out, since the persons likely to read the brochure were not likely to identify the drawing as a picture of the plaintiff.
- However, the defendants were liable for the tort of appropriating the plaintiff's personality, the reproduction of the drawing for commercial advantage being an invasion of the plaintiff's exclusive right to market his personality.
- The measure of damages should be the amount he ought reasonably to have received in the market for permission to publish the drawings, and should be awarded on a joint and several liability basis.
- IDL (sued by CAC on a third party basis) was liable for its negligent statement that the plaintiff's permission was not required. As an expert in the public relations field the second defendant should have realized that there might have been a legal problem. CAC was awarded judgment for contribution and indemnity in respect of the damages awarded to Athans.
- The injunction sought by Athans to restrain future use his image was not appropriate, as there was no reasonable apprehension that the defendants would do so.

== Aftermath ==
Athans extended the concept of personality rights in Canadian law that was first recognized in Krouse v. Chrysler Canada Ltd., where the Court held that where a person has marketable value in their likeness, and it has been used in a manner that suggests an endorsement of a product then there is grounds for an action in appropriation of personality. By using equity to hold that a clear depiction was not necessary in order to establish fault, the court declared:

The commercial use of his representational image by the defendants without his consent constituted an invasion and pro tanto an impairment of his exclusive right to market his personality and this, in my opinion, constitutes an aspect of the tort of appropriation of personality. This conduct gives rise to an action sounding in tort that is separate and distinct from any action based on infringement of trademark or copyright, should that exist.
