= Sallows (surname) =

Sallows is a surname. Notable people with the surname include:

- Cary-Anne McTaggart (born Cary-Anne Sallows) (b. 1986), Canadian curler
- Lee Sallows (b. 1944), British electronics engineer
- Reuben R. Sallows (1855–1937), Canadian photographer
- Thomas Sallows (b. 1984), Canadian curler
