= Jock Carroll =

Canadian writer, journalist and photographer

Jock Carroll (March 5, 1919 – August 4, 1995) was a Canadian writer, journalist and photographer who worked for the Canadian media, including the Toronto Telegram.

== History ==
Born in Toronto, Jock Carroll developed a 40-year career as a photojournalist, commencing in the late 1940s. He both took and developed his own photographs from a self-made darkroom and quickly became popular for being able to produce news reports with accompanying photographs. His first published works appeared in such magazines as Saturday Night, Sports Illustrated and Esquire. In 1950, Carroll joined Weekend magazine as a staff writer. He ultimately became the associate editor of the magazine, during the course of his twenty-year association with it.

During the Korean War, Carroll was a war correspondent. This experience resulted in the 1955 publication of his first book, Korean Boy, which was the true story of Pak Jong Yong, a boy who fled with his family from North Korea to Pusan, in South Korea. Carroll was able to persuade management at Weekend Magazine to sponsor Pak Jong Yong's university education in Canada. Carroll later became the president of the Canadian War Correspondents Association.

In addition to his presidency of the Canadian War Correspondents Association, Carroll was a member of a number of journalist organizations, including the Toronto Men's Press Club, the Authors League of America, the Professional Photographers Association of Canada and the Ontario Sports Writers Association.

In 1961, Bottoms Up, Carroll's only novel, was published by Olympia Press. It was reissued by Collectors Publications in 1967. Collectors Publications, similar to Olympia Press, was known for publishing risqué novels. The novel is a satire about the magazine industry, with the heroine based on Marilyn Monroe, whom Carroll had interviewed and photographed in 1952. The book was not accepted for publication in Canada, due to its sexual content. Carroll then approached Maurice Girodias, the owner of Paris-based Olympia Press, who agreed to publish it. When republished in 1964 by Stein and Day as The Shy Photographer, the book was translated into multiple languages and sold half a million copies.

Carroll's book, The Death of the Toronto Telegram and Other Newspaper Stories was published in 1971 by Pocket Books Canada, a division of Simon & Schuster. The book includes many anecdotes about the Canadian newspaper business from the 1940s to 1970. Included are interviews with Marilyn Monroe in 1952, writer Arthur Hailey (1966), Elvis Presley (1956), and Toronto millionaire businessman "Honest" Ed Mirvish (1970).

In 1972, Simon & Schuster published Carroll's book on the 1972 Summer Olympic Games.

Carroll then became associated with Pocket Books Canada as the editor of a series of mass-market paperbacks by Canadian authors, known as "Carroll's Canadian Originals". Included in the series was Carroll's own book, Down The Road, published in 1974. The book was promoted as "Uninhibited talks with Marilyn Monroe and other famous sex symbols. Photos." and included a cover photo of a Marilyn Monroe lookalike.

Carroll's next book was The Life and Times of Gregory Clark, Canada's Favorite Storyteller, published by Doubleday in 1981. Clark was a well-known Canadian journalist who had died in 1977. Clark was also Caroll's colleague at Weekend Magazine, where Clark was the back-page columnist.

In 1984, Carroll contributed the text to The Farm, which featured photographs by Reuben R. Sallows and John de Visser. Reuben Sallows (1855–1937) had gained fame as one of Canada's early professional photographers, while John de Visser had been a professional photographer in Canada since the early 1960s. The book, published by Methuen to commemorate the sesquicentennial of Ontario, was a history of Ontario farming in the early 20th century. Black and white photos by Sallows were complemented by contemporary colour photos by de Visser, plus text from Carroll.

In 1995, Carroll was subject to a claim in relation to copyright and ownership issues, regarding his book of photographs of Glenn Gould, (Glenn Gould: Some Portraits of the Artist as a Young Man, (Stoddart 1995). Carroll had taken the photographs in 1956, during the course of also interviewing Gould for a magazine article. The Court of Appeal for Ontario found in Carroll's favour in the decision of Gould Estate v. Stoddart Publishing Co. Ltd., though the decision was rendered subsequent to Carroll's death.

In 1996, Carroll's book, Falling For Marilyn: The Lost Niagara Collection, was published posthumously by Stoddart Publishing. It contains photographs of Marilyn Monroe taken by Carroll in 1952, on the set of the film Niagara, which had originally accompanied a 1952 article by Carroll in Weekend magazine.

== Publications ==
=== Non-fiction ===
- 1996 Falling For Marilyn: The Lost Niagara Collection (Stoddart)
- 1995 Glenn Gould: Some Portraits of The Artist as a Young Man (Stoddart)
- 1984 The Farm (Photographs by Reuben Sallows and John De Visser, text by Jock Carroll; Methuen)
- 1981 The Life and Times of Gregory Clark, Canada's Favorite Storyteller (Doubleday)
- 1974 Down The Road (Pocket Books)
- 1972 The Summer Olympic Games (Simon & Schuster)
- 1971 The Death of the Toronto Telegram and Other Newspaper Stories (Pocket Books)
- 1955 Korean Boy (with Pak Jong Yong; Macmillan)

=== Fiction ===
- 1964 The Shy Photographer (Stein and Day; reprint of Bottoms Up)
- 1961 Bottoms Up (Olympia Press)
