= Gould Estate v Stoddart Publishing Co Ltd =

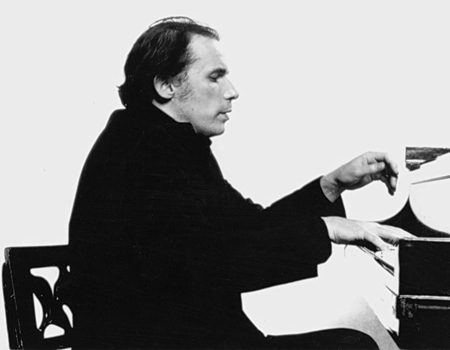
- Court: Ontario Court of Appeal
- Decided: 1998-05-06
- Citations: (1996), 39 OR 555, 161 DLR (4th) 321, 1998 CanLII 5513

Case history
- Appealed from: Ontario Superior Court of Justice, (1996), 30 OR (3d) 520, 1996 CanLII 8209

Court membership
- Judges sitting: Finlayson, Krever and Weiler JJ.A.

Case opinions
- Decision by: Finlayson J.A.

Keywords
- copyright, misappropriation of personality, public interest

Gould Estate v Stoddart Publishing Co Ltd (1998), 39 OR 555 (Ont CA), is a Canadian case on appropriation of personality, the ownership of copyright, and requirements of fixation.

== Background ==
During 1956, Jock Carroll interviewed a young Glenn Gould for an article in Weekend Magazine. Carroll documented much of the encounter, he took pictures of Gould, wrote notes and took an audio recording of the interview. All of this was permitted by Gould. The article was eventually published under the title "I Don't Think I'm at All Eccentric". Gould died in 1982. In 1995, Stoddart Publishing published Carroll's book, Glenn Gould: Some Portraits of the Artist as a Young Man. The book contained 70 photographs from the 1956 interview, as well a narrative that was largely based on the 1956 notes and recording, including many quotations by Gould.

The estate of Glenn Gould brought an action against Carroll and Stoddart Publishing for copyright infringement in the material that Carroll had recorded and the pictures he had taken, as well as for appropriation of personality. Both sides agreed that there was no contract in effect that would have governed the matter.

== The judgment below ==
At trial, Lederman J. dismissed both claims.

- On the copyright issue, copyright in the photographs vested in the defendants, while Gould’s oral statements in the interview did not attract copyright which might have given the estate standing to sue.
- On the issue of appropriation of personality, the judge found that Gould's proprietary rights were not violated because Gould's image was used as a subject of the book rather than for endorsement.

Lederman J. discussed the area of appropriation of personality at some length in his judgment. In obiter comments, he characterized it as being a right of publicity, as opposed to a right of privacy. The latter is a personal right which does not survive the death of the subject, while the former can devolve to the subject's estate:

[23] In the end then, and perhaps at the risk of oversimplifying, it seems that the courts have drawn a "sales vs. subject" distinction. Sales constitute commercial exploitation and invoke the tort of appropriation of personality. The identity of the celebrity is merely being used in some fashion. The activity cannot be said to be about the celebrity. This is in contrast to situations in which the celebrity is the actual subject of the work or enterprise, with biographies perhaps being the clearest example. These activities would not be within the ambit of the tort. To take a more concrete example, in endorsement situations, posters and board games, the essence of the activity is not the celebrity. It is the use of some attributes of the celebrity for another purpose. Biographies, other books, plays, and satirical skits are by their nature different. The subject of the activity is the celebrity and the work is an attempt to provide some insights about that celebrity.

...

[28] A more theoretical approach to distinguishing the Privacy Acts can be found in U.S. law. There, several cases have recognized a distinction between the right of privacy and the right of publicity.... The former is considered a personal tort and is designed to protect an individual’s interest in dignity and peace of mind. The right of publicity, on the other hand, protects the commercial value of a person’s celebrity status. As such, it is a form of intangible property, akin to copyright or patent, that is descendable. Given that the Canadian statutory rights of action are found in Privacy Acts, it would certainly seem that, following the U.S. reasoning, whatever statutory restrictions there may be on the rights of action for privacy violations and unauthorized use of personality, they should not be applied to the common law tort of appropriation of personality.

[29] The right of publicity, being a form of intangible property under Ontario law akin to copyright, should descend to the celebrity’s heirs. Reputation and fame can be a capital asset that one nurtures and may choose to exploit and it may have a value much greater than any tangible property.

He summarized the issue of copyright as follows:

[37] Here too, the nature of the interview, conducted in informal settings—at an empty Massey Hall, at the home of Gould’s mother and on vacation in the Bahamas—was such that it was intended to be casual, to catch the spontaneity of Gould when he was relaxing. The conversation between the two men was the kind that Gould would have with a friend. Indeed Gould and Carroll remained friends for a short while afterwards. Gould was not delivering a structured lecture or dictating to Carroll. Rather, Carroll engaged Gould in easygoing conversation out of which emerged comments which provided insights into Gould’s character and personal life. Gould was making offhand comments that he knew could find their way into the public domain. This is not the kind of discourse which the Copyright Act intended to protect.

== At the Court of Appeal ==
The Court of Appeal for Ontario affirmed the trial decision, dismissing the appeal but decided the case on conventional copyright principles rather than appropriation of personality. The court held that the oral statements of Gould could not be protected by copyright because there was not fixation. Gould was not reading from a speech or had prepared anything that was said.

Finlayson J.A. approved the trial judge's findings, where he held:

[27] As must be evident from my approach to this case, I am not persuaded that I should analyze the facts of this case in the context of a claim for misappropriation of personality. I am satisfied that it can be disposed of on conventional intellectual property lines and there is no necessity to explore any balance between privacy rights and the public’s interest in a prominent Canadian. However, I cannot leave the matter without commenting on the efforts of the appellants to seek the moral high ground by asserting that Carroll was exploiting the artistic genius of another at no cost to himself. This misdescribes the legal issues. We are not concerned about Gould’s musical or artistic works but with Carroll’s literary and artistic work. The book of portraits is Carroll’s creation, not Gould’s. He was, and now his heirs are the owners of this literary and artistic creation and it is his estate that is entitled to protection from the appellants who contributed nothing to the book. Not only did the appellants not create the book, they were incapable of doing so. Carroll had the photographs, the tapes and his notes of his interviews with Gould. He was the only person who could have reached back in his memory and recreated the scenes where he first met Gould. The results are captivating. The book provides a compelling insight into the character of a musical genius. In protecting Carroll’s artistic creation, the law permits the public to benefit from an insight into Gould’s early years to which it would otherwise be denied.

== See also ==
- Krouse v Chrysler Canada Ltd
