= Bob Krouse =

Former Canadian football player

Profile
- Position: Linebacker

Personal information
- Born: February 21, 1943 (age 83); Hamilton, Ontario, Canada
- Listed height: 6 ft 1 in (1.85 m)
- Listed weight: 195 lb (88 kg)

Career information
- College: Central Collegiate High School

Career history
- 1963–1975: Hamilton Tiger-Cats

Awards and highlights
- 4× Grey Cup champion (1963, 1965, 1967, 1972); CFL East All-Star (1967)

Bob Krouse (born February 21, 1943, in Hamilton, Ontario) is a Canadian former professional football linebacker who played thirteen seasons in the Canadian Football League for the Hamilton Tiger-Cats. He was a part of the Tiger-Cats 1963, 1965, 1967 and 1972 Grey Cup winning teams.

A case involving the use of Bob Krouse's image, Krouse v Chrysler Canada Ltd, was the earliest Canadian law case to recognize the tort of appropriation of personality.
