= Nussenzweig v. DiCorcia =

Nussenzweig v. diCorcia is a decision by the New York Supreme Court in New York County, holding that a photographer could display, publish, and sell street photography without the consent of the subjects of those photographs.

== Persons involved in lawsuit ==
=== Erno Nussenzweig ===
Erno Nussenzweig (born 1922) is a retired diamond merchant from Union City, New Jersey. Nussenzweig was represented in this lawsuit by attorney Jay Goldberg.

=== Philip-Lorca diCorcia ===
Philip-Lorca diCorcia (born 1951) is an artist and photographer who shows with the Pace/MacGill Gallery in New York City. DiCorcia was represented in this lawsuit by Lawrence Barth of the law firm of Munger, Tolles & Olson LLP in Los Angeles, California.

== Photograph ==
The photograph was taken by diCorcia in Times Square in Manhattan. The images were exhibited at Pace/MacGill Gallery from September 6, 2001 to October 13, 2001. Pace/MacGill then published them in a book of diCorcia's work titled Heads. DiCorcia created ten limited edition prints of each photograph in the book and they were sold for US$20,000 to US$30,000 each.

== Lawsuit ==
In 2005, Nussenzweig learned of the photograph and filed a lawsuit, claiming that diCorcia and Pace/MacGill had violated his privacy rights under Sections 50 and 51 of New York's Civil Rights Law and that, as a Klausenburg Orthodox Jew, such a display would violate the Commandment in Torah against graven images. New York law prohibits the use of a person's likeness, without consent, "for advertising or for purposes of trade." DiCorcia and Pace/MacGill argued that the photograph represented "artistic expression", and was protected under the First Amendment and that the statute of limitations had expired for bringing a lawsuit. On February 8, 2006 the court ruled in favor of diCorcia and Pace/MacGill Gallery and dismissed the lawsuit on both counts. In March 2007 the decision was upheld by the New York Supreme Court, Appellate Division. In November 2007 the New York Court of Appeals upheld all previous decisions based on the statute of limitations and "artistic expression".

== See also ==
- Personality rights
