= Greg Clark (journalist) =

Canadian newspaperman, soldier, outdoorsman, humorist

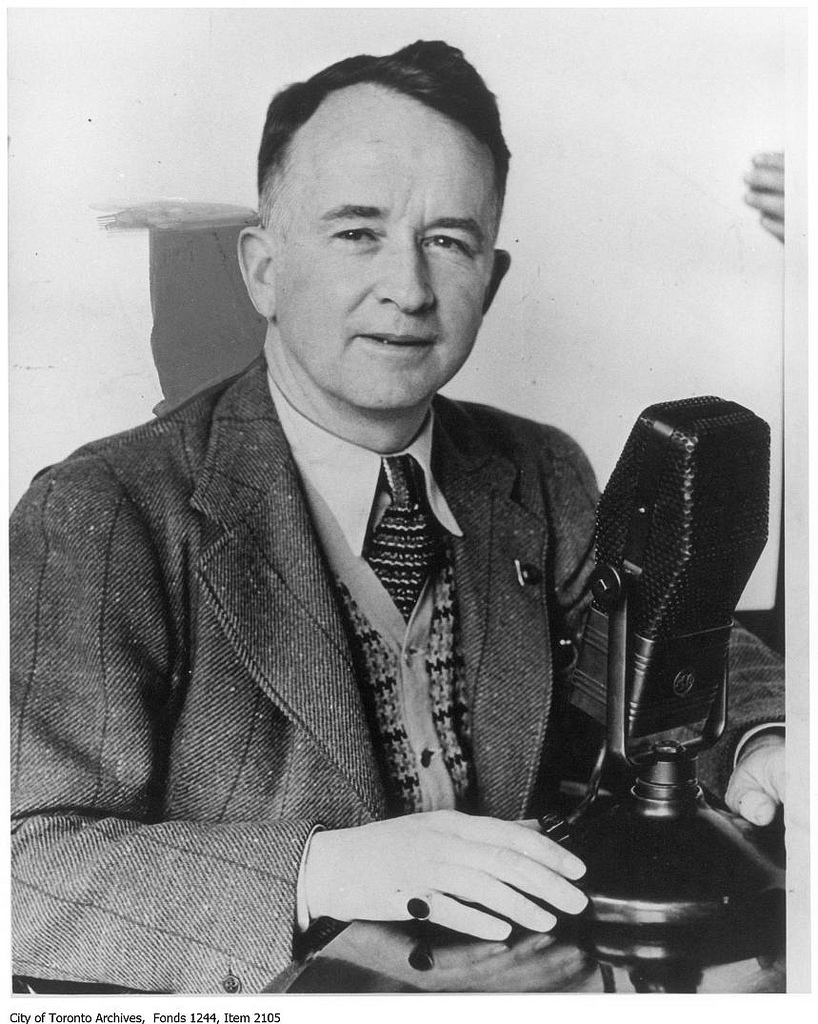
- Clark, circa 1935
- Born: Gregory Clark; September 25, 1892; Toronto, Ontario, Canada
- Died: February 3, 1977 (aged 84); Toronto, Ontario
- Occupations: newspaperman, soldier, outdoorsman, humourist
- Known for: journalism, taking part in both World Wars
- Military career
- Allegiance: British Empire
- Branch: Canadian army
- Rank: major (rank)
- Conflicts: World War I; Vimy Ridge
- Awards: Order of Canada; Order of the British Empire

Gregory Clark, OC OBE MC (September 25, 1892 – February 3, 1977) was a Canadian war veteran, journalist, and humourist. A reporter for the Toronto Star from 1911 to 1946, Clark gained fame in Canada for his coverage of various news events of the 1920s and 1930s, and particularly for his front-line coverage of World War II. He also began writing a popular humour column in the 1930s, which continued after he left the Star and was widely syndicated throughout Canada into the early 1970s.

In 1967, he was made one of the initial Officers of the Order of Canada "for the humour which he has brought to his profession as a newspaper writer and radio commentator".

Major Gregory Clark is buried in Mount Pleasant Cemetery.

== Early life ==
Clark was born and raised in Toronto, and attended high school at Harbord Collegiate Institute. In 1911, after twice failing his first year studies at the University of Toronto, Clark joined the editorial staff of the Toronto Star, where his father Joseph worked as an editor. Clark worked at the Star for the next 36 years, interrupted only by military service in World War I.

== World War I ==
Beginning military service in 1916, Clark survived in the trenches until 1918. He fought in the Battle of Vimy Ridge during which he was awarded the Military Cross for conspicuous gallantry after he took over as commander after his company had lost theirs. Clark returned to Canada a major with the 4th Canadian Mounted Rifles.

== Post-war ==
After the Armistice, Clark returned to his job as a newspaper reporter.In the 1920s and 1930s, Clark became one of the Toronto Star's best known reporters and columnists. He worked alongside a young Ernest Hemingway in the Star newsroom. Clark was initially suspicious of the "tall young squirt" who showed up in his office in 1920, but the two men later became friends. Clark urged Hemingway to give up fiction and concentrate his efforts on journalism "where his true talent -- and his brilliant future -- lay". Clark later cheerfully admitted that Hemingway was wise to ignore his advice.

Among the stories Clark covered were the Great Haileybury Fire of 1922, the Lindbergh Kidnap Trial in 1935, the coronation of King George VI and the royal couple's 1939 tour of Canada. Perhaps his most celebrated piece of reportage was his coverage of the Moose River Gold Mines disaster of 1936. After arriving in Nova Scotia to cover the story, Clark continued to stay with the rescue crew after many other reporters had left, as they had given up hope the trapped miners were still alive. Clark was therefore on hand when the first faint taps of the trapped miners were heard, and was able to report the scoop first-hand.

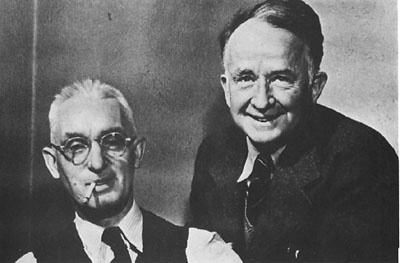
Clark with friend and collaborator, cartoonist Jimmy Frise

Clark also wrote a regular column. Usually lightly humorous in tone, his columns were closely observed real-life vignettes that told stories of everyday trials, tribulations, and minor triumphs. An avid outdoorsman and conservationist, he often wrote of the adventures he and his friends had while on (or preparing for) a fishing or hunting trip. By the late 1930s, Clark's columns, illustrated by Jimmie Frise, were so popular in Canada that Star editor Charles Lymbery averred that more Canadians recognized Clark on the street than they would the prime minister, a member of the royal family or a Hollywood movie star. A selection of Clark's columns and Frise's illustrations appeared in a volume titled Which We Did in 1936. Frise talked of their blunderings to the Star: "We've fried eggs on the city hall steps. We caulked my house and flooded the parlor with cement. I once let Greg persuade me to get a steam shovel to do my spring digging and ruined my garden. Perhaps this book is our most foolish adventure." A follow-up volume, So What, appeared in 1937.

== World War II ==
Too old for active service in World War II, Clark returned to the battlefield as a reporter. To his peers he was the dean of Canadian war correspondents. Clark reported on the Blitzkrieg from France in 1940, on Dunkirk and Dieppe from England, and on the Italian and North-West Europe campaigns from the Front. He was awarded the OBE for his service as a war correspondent.

== Post-war ==
Returning to the Star at the war's conclusion, both Frise and Clark became unhappy with the paper's treatment of its staff, and agreed with each other in 1946 to leave at the first opportunity. Clark's having been denied leave by the Star after the death of his first son, Murray Clark, may have been a factor in this decision. Clark contacted John McConnell, publisher of the Montreal Standard, a newspaper with a smaller circulation than the Star that had earlier offered him a position. McConnell offered the pair salaries similar to what they received at the Star, as well as the opportunity for Frise to have his comic strip syndicated in the United States, which would supplement his income. The pair left the Star in December.

Clark and Frise continued to work together for the Standard beginning in early 1947, until Frise's death from a heart attack, on June 13, 1948.

Clark continued as a syndicated columnist for the rest of his life. Frise was replaced as illustrator by Duncan Macpherson, but he and Clark parted ways around 1950, and Clark did not work with another illustrator thereafter.

In 1951, the Standard was changed to a magazine format and relaunched as Weekend Magazine (later Weekend), which was distributed across Canada as a weekend supplement to local newspapers. Around the same time Clark began to write a daily column called "Gregory Clark's Packsack", which was published in numerous Canadian newspapers throughout the 1950s and 1960s. The Packsack columns were a miscellany of observations, musings, anecdotes and remembrances, and ran for 17 years until Clark's health forced him to curtail his writing activities. Clark's weekend column (usually titled "Greg Clark Tells About...") was in the form of a personal story, often telling of his minor misadventures and mishaps with various (usually fictional) companions, such as his extremely frugal neighbour Dandy Daniels or his various fishing buddies. These stories were published in the Weekend magazine supplement right into the mid-1970s.

In 1959, Clark was persuaded to issue the collection The Best of Gregory Clark, which consisted of an editor's selection of Clark's best pieces from Weekend from the 1950s. It was successful enough to merit a series of sequels, beginning with Greg's Choice (1961) a selection of Clark's own favourite Weekend columns. Collections of Clark's columns thereafter appeared every year or two for the rest of his life.

Most of Clark's Weekend columns were humorous pieces about hunting and fishing or family life; some of them were about his experiences in both World Wars. One of his more famous columns, "One Block of Howland Avenue", describes how Clark's elderly father asked his two sons, both decorated veterans, never to walk up the street past the neighbours again. All the young men of the Howland block had died in World War I, except Greg and his brother Joseph. Clark's father tried to balance his pride and joy at having both sons back home with his grief and concern for his neighbours and friends, who were not so lucky.

Though he was probably Canada's most honoured journalist, an initiate Officer of the Order of Canada, and decorated as both a fighting soldier and as a war correspondent, Clark's work is currently out of print.

== Biography ==
In 1981, Doubleday published The Life and Times of Gregory Clark, Canada's Favorite Storyteller, written by fellow journalist Jock Carroll.

== Quotes ==
- "A sportsman is one who not only will not show his own father where the best fishing holes are but will deliberately direct him to the wrong ones." —from a speech to the Empire Club of Canada in 1950

== Books ==
=== Collected essays and newspaper columns ===
- Which We Did, R. Saunders (1936)
- So What?, R. Saunders (1937)
- The Best of Gregory Clark, ISBN 0-7700-6024-2, Ryerson Press (1959)
- Greg's Choice, ISBN 0-7700-6025-0, Ryerson Press (1961)
- Hi, There!, ISBN 0-7700-6026-9, Ryerson Press (1963)
- War Stories, Ryerson Press (1964), winner of the Stephen Leacock Award for Humour in 1965
- May Your First Love be Your Last, ISBN 0-00-216692-5, McClelland and Stewart (1969)
- A Bar'l of Apples: a Gregory Clark Omnibus, ISBN 0-07-092952-1, McGraw-Hill Ryerson (1971)
- Outdoors with Gregory Clark, ISBN 0-7710-2108-9, McClelland and Stewart (1971)
- The Bird of Promise, ISBN 0-88890-010-4, McClelland and Stewart (1973)
- Grandma Preferred Steak, ISBN 0-88890-024-4, (1974)
- Fishing with Gregory Clark, ISBN 0-88890-033-3, Prentice-Hall of Canada (1975)
- Things That Go Squeak in the Night, ISBN 0-88890-053-8, Prentice-Hall (1976)
- The Best of Greg Clark and Jimmie Frise, ISBN 0-00-216683-6, Collins (1977)
- Silver Linings, ISBN 0-00-216699-2, Collins (1978)
- Greg Clark and Jimmie Frise Outdoors, ISBN 0-00-216607-0, Collins (1979)
- Ten Cents Off Per Dozen: A Gregory Clark Omnibus, ISBN 0-88890-116-X, Optimum (1979)
- A Supersonic Day (from the Packsack of Gregory Clark), ISBN 0-7710-2112-7, McClelland and Stewart (1980)
- Greg Clark and Jimmie Frise Go Fishing, ISBN 0-00-216618-6, Collins (1980)

=== Other ===
- With Rod and Reel in Canada, Canadian Government Travel Bureau (1947)

=== As a contributor ===
- The Face of Canada, Clarke, Irwin & Company (1959)
