= Reuben R. Sallows =

Canadian photographer

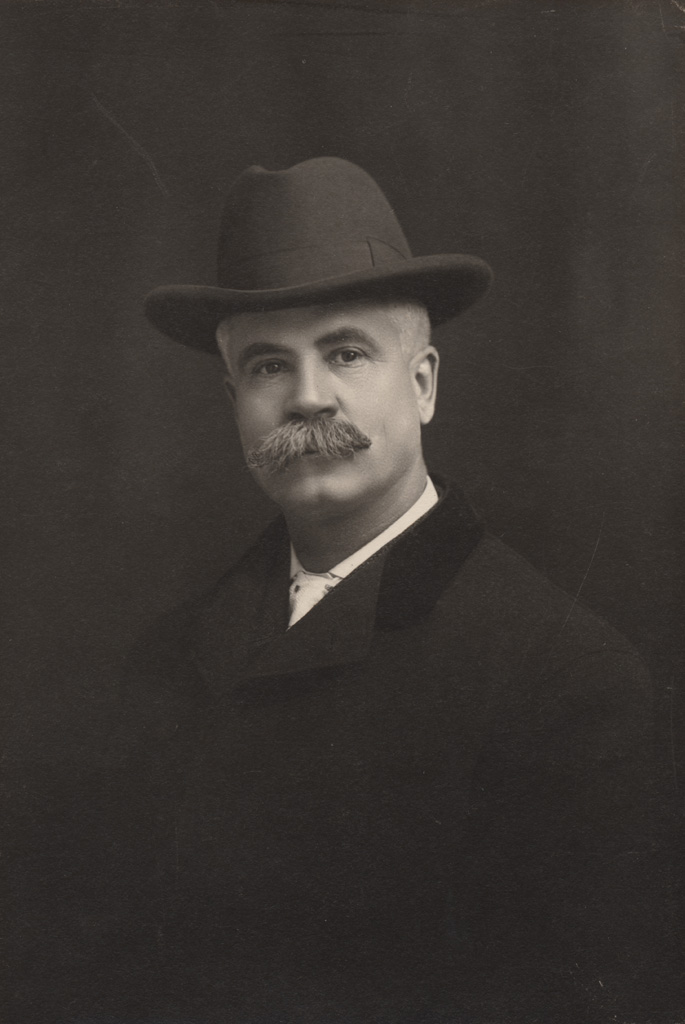
- Self-portrait, date unknown
- Born: 1855; Huron County, Canada West
- Died: July 31, 1937 (aged 81–82); Goderich, Ontario, Canada
- Movement: portraiture, pictorialism

Reuben R. Sallows (1855–1937) was a professional photographer from Goderich, Ontario, a Canadian photographer known for his "portraits of children posed in bucolic settings, as well as for his lovingly humorous depictions of country youth." He was an adopter of the pictorialism movement in Canada and a frequent contributor to Canadian Pictorial magazine.

== Early life ==
Sallows was born on a farm in Huron County, not far from Goderich, Ontario. He left the farm in 1876 to look for work and was offered a job with a Goderich photographer, R.R. Thompson. Sallows accepted a three-year apprenticeship in 1878. He subsequently bought the entire business in 1881.

He was married on August 23, 1882, at which point he was already "a well-known photographer".

== Style and business ==
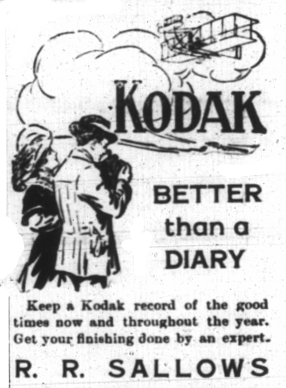
1915 newspaper for Reuben Sallows' shop in Goderich

Sallows' started his career as a portrait photographer before progressing to landscape photography near the end of the 19th century. His many travels lead him from agricultural settings to wilderness areas of Canada. He is said to also have photographed the Doukhobors in British Columbia, but none of these photographs have been found. Numerous photographs were sent overseas to companies that no longer exist. As of the 1990s, it was uncertain if any of these photographs exist in overseas archives.

Sallows' photographs "are meant to call to mind the quintessential country lad who is self-reliant, loves adventure, and lives in harmony, but who can also be impulsive and mischievous". He was also known as a "rogue photographer" who travelled to the small towns, farmlands and into the expansive Canadian wilderness of Ontario, northern Quebec and the eastern provinces. He travelled with his camera in a black Ford Model A truck, in a canoe or by train as he travelled across Canada between 1881 and 1937. In addition to portraits, he also sold his photographs to postcard and lithograph companies in Canada, the United States, Germany and Great Britain. Many of his portraits were published in newspapers and magazines of the era, including one in National Geographic magazine in 1920. He also counted among his customers the governments of Canada and the provinces of Alberta and Ontario. Sallows offered photo-finishing in his shop, highlighting Kodak products in a 1915 newspaper ad.

Sallows' photographs were used by governments and farm periodicals "to help entice immigrants needed to develop southern Ontario.He did his job well, perhaps too well."

Sallows' many photographs of the "dairyqueens" of the era were often used in advertisements for dairy implement companies. He worked in an early style of pin-up girls:

Most often, the women were posed with neatly arranged hair in an up-do in their most pleasant attire, usually covered by a pristine, white bib-apron. Dairyqueens were unfailingly young, beautiful, smiling and depicted as completing their chore with little effort, thanks to their labour-saving tools. To convey the impression of hygiene in the dairying process the dairyqueen's clothes—often of white or light-coloured cloth—the machinery and surroundings were pictured as dirt- and germ-free, which is the best environment for producing superior milk, cream and butter. Notably, the background for the dairyqueen was always picturesque.

While obvious to viewers of the era, his photographs could be construed as fact when viewed with more modern eyes. The women shown were often pristine, showing little evidence of the actual work required on a dairy farm. The photographer hoped that his images would "portray the province's rurality in a positive light by capturing it in its best seasons."

== Death ==
Sallows died in a motor vehicle accident when his truck turned over in loose gravel after a blowout and pinned him to the ground in a ditch. He was driving south on Highway 21 near Kintail, Ontario, to photograph a local summer camp. "[...] Mr. Sallows was conscious when pulled from beneath his old car by members of a road construction gang working nearby. [...] Rushed the accident victim to Alexandra Hospital, and such was the elderly man's great strength that he refused help and walked to the building unaided, in spite of his grievous injuries. He died about fourteen hours later on Saturday morning." His chest was crushed in the accident on July 30, 1937, forcing broken ribs into his lungs. He died of his injuries on July 31, 1937.

== Legacy ==
His photographs are held by several institutions, including the Archives of Ontario, the Reuben R. Sallows Gallery in Goderich (operated by a non-profit board of directors and located at the Goderich Branch Huron County Library), the University of Guelph, the University of Toronto, the University of Western Ontario, Library and Archives Canada and the Glenbow Museum and Archives in Calgary.
