= Krouse v Chrysler Canada Ltd =

Canadian court case

Krouse v. Chrysler Canada Ltd.
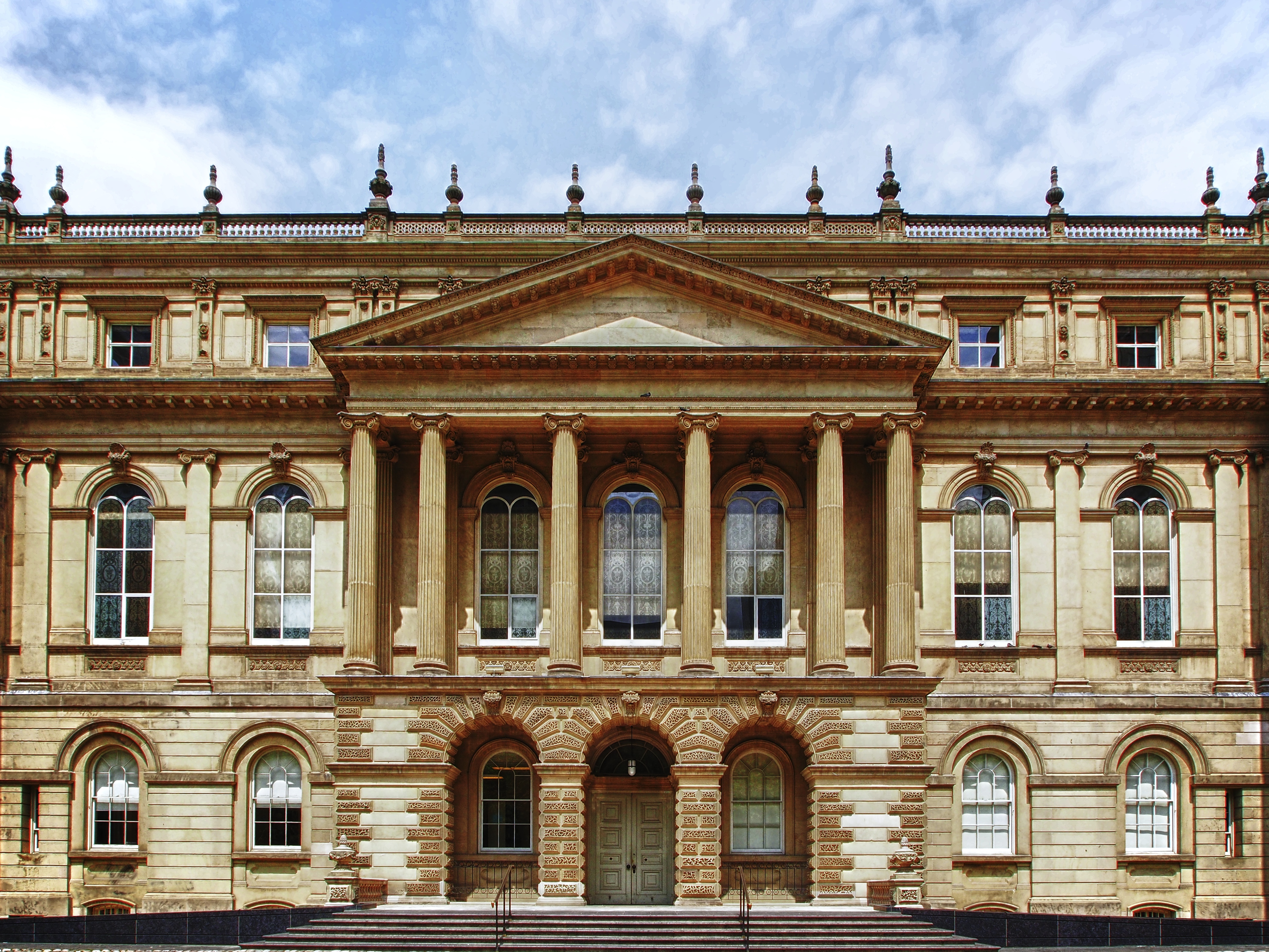
- Court: Ontario Court of Appeal
- Citations: (1973) 40 D.L.R. (3d) 15 (Ont. C.A.), (1973) 13 C.P.R. (2d) 28

Case history
- Appealed from: Ontario Superior Court of Justice, Krouse v. Chrysler Canada Ltd., (1971), 5 C.P.R. (2d) 30

Case opinions
- Decision by: Estey J.A.

Krouse v. Chrysler Canada Ltd. is generally thought to be the first case to clearly acknowledge the existence in Canada of a tort of appropriation of personality.

== Background ==
Bob Krouse was a well-known professional football player with the Hamilton Tiger-cats who played as the number 14. Grant Advertising was an advertising firm whose clients included Chrysler Canada. In 1969, Grant had produced an advertising scheme for Chrysler which included a cardboard scorecard that was distributed to the public. The scorecard was known as the "Plymouth Pro Football Spotter" which allowed football fans to track scores. On the Spotter was an image of Krouse from behind with his number 14 clearly visible.

Krouse sued Chrysler for use of his image without his consent.

== The judgment below ==
The claim that was presented was considered to consist of five distinct elements:

(i) invasion of privacy per se;
(ii) appropriation of the plaintiff 's identity for commercial purposes;
(iii) breach of confidence;
(iv) breach of contract; and
(v) unjust enrichment.

In his opinion, Haines J. considered the first claim to be novel in principle, and accordingly declined to rule on it. The third and fourth claims were also dismissed. He then proceeded to what he regarded as the ‘guts’ of the case: the claim that ‘the plaintiff [had] become identified with the products of the defendants and ...had ...his chances of advertising for other automobile manufacturers seriously affected’. Such a claim raised three key issues of fact and law:

- whether the plaintiff had a ‘saleable product advertising ability’;
- whether such an ability was a property right protected by law; and
- whether the defendant's poster was an appropriation of such a right.

The first question was answered in the affirmative, and it was found that the second question could also be answered affirmatively, based on two ‘separate but closely related lines of cases’: passing off, and the right of an individual to the elements of his identity.

In his opinion, Haines J. found that Krouse did have a right to protect the commercial advertising power in his image. Along with marketing his athletic ability, Krouse also marketed his reputation and image. Both were a product of his work and effort, and so he should be entitled to protect it. As was noted in the opinion:

[o]ne would think that the wrongful appropriation of that which in the business world has commercial value and is traded daily must ipso facto involve a property right which the Courts protect. Property being an open-ended concept to protect the possession and use of that which has measurable commercial value, logic seems to impel such a result.

In examining the Spotter, the Court found that Chrysler was attempting to take advantage of Krouse's image to increase sales. Krouse was clearly identifiable within the picture and was the centre of focus. The Court found, however, that Krouse was unable to show that his ability to market his image was harmed, and he was granted $1,000 for general damages.

== At the Court of Appeal ==
The defendants appealed, arguing that there was no valid cause of action, since the use of the plaintiff's image was not libellous, and since there was an absence of a common field of activity on which to found an action in passing off.

The Ontario Court of Appeal found for the defendants on the passing off claim, by maintaining the need to show a common field of activity. In a decision written by Estey J.A., it was held that while Canadian law may contemplate a tort of appropriation of personality, the elements of that cause of action were not made out in this case.

Estey, J.A. did not categorically dismiss the possibility of a tort that could broadly be read to encompass an individual's right to control how his or her personality is used:

[T]he common law does contemplate a concept in the law of torts which may be broadly classified as an appropriation of one's personality […] there may well be circumstances in which the Courts would be justified in holding a defendant liable in damages for appropriation of a plaintiff's personality, amounting to an invasion of his right to exploit his personality by the use of his image, voice or otherwise with damage to the plaintiff.

The Court of Appeal did not elaborate on, or depart from, Haines J's analysis of the law at first instance.

== Aftermath ==
The case was unique in that relatively little weight was placed on the need for formal authority. What was more important were the underlying reasons of substance, particularly the apparent commercial reality that a person's image had a de facto value and was effectively traded as a commodity. The new tort of appropriation of personality did not develop through a gradual extension of an existing cause of action, such as passing off or libel, until it formed a separate and autonomous cause of action, but rather through one bold judicial stroke at first instance.

== See also ==
- Gould Estate v. Stoddart Publishing Co. Ltd.
