= Personality rights =

Individuals' control of their identity for commercial uses

Personality rights, sometimes referred to as the right of publicity in the United States, include rights to stop others from making unauthorized uses a person's identity, such as uses of their name, image, likeness, voice (Note: See Jennifer E. Rothman, The Right of Publicity: Privacy Reimagined for a Public World (Harvard Univ. Press 2018).) or other indicia of identity. These rights are often considered as property rights, but sometimes as personal rights, or as a hybrid of both. These rights sometimes survive the death of the individual to varying degrees, depending on the jurisdiction.

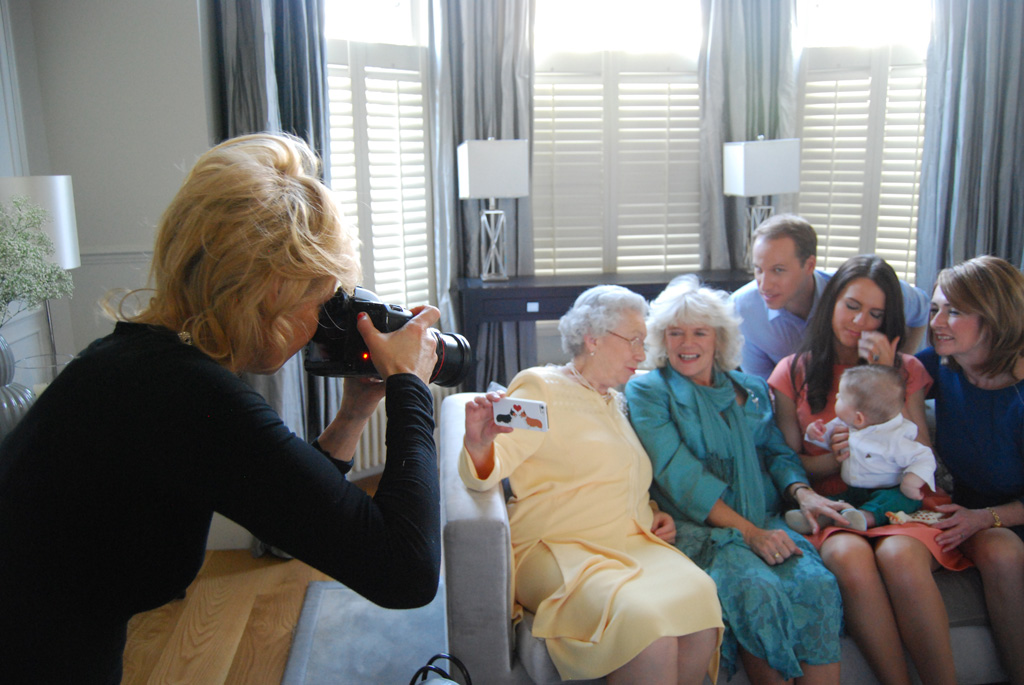
Alison Jackson photographing lookalikes posing as the British royal family

== Classification ==
Some distinguish the right of publicity from the right of privacy, and suggest that publicity rights are focused on commercial interests and align with copyright and trademark law. Others have noted that this is historically inaccurate with regard to the right's development in the United States, and even today most states treat the appropriation branch of the right of privacy as either the same as the right of publicity, or the elements of the two torts are essentially the same. This is largely true at common law. However, some states have also adopted statutory rights which deviate from this alignment and sometimes (but not always) focus more on commercial interests. Almost every state has adopted a right of publicity or similar law under the moniker of "privacy." Only about half of the states have done so by statute.

There are multiple justifications for the right of publicity in the United States, including a more consequential or utilitarian based theory approach and a more moral-based deontological approach, as well as combinations of both. The consequential or utilitarian approach assumes that because there is a potential for creators to obtain rights to an object—here an individual's personality—it will incentivize creators economically to create more goods. In contrast, a commonly cited justification for the deontological doctrine, from a policy standpoint, is the notion of natural rights from a Lockean theory of property, and the idea that every individual should have a right to control how their right of publicity is commercialized or otherwise used by a third party, if at all. Sometimes the motivation to engage in such commercialization is to help propel sales or visibility for a product or service.

== Civil law and common law jurisdictions ==
In contrast with common law jurisdictions, most civil law jurisdictions have specific civil code provisions that protect an individual's image, personal data and other generally private information. Exceptions have been carved out of these general, broad privacy rights when dealing with news and public figures. Thus, while it may violate an ordinary citizen's privacy to speak about their medical records, one is generally allowed to report on more intimate details in the lives of celebrities and politicians.

Unlike most common law jurisdictions the personality rights in civil law are generally inheritable, thus one can make a claim against someone who invades the privacy of a deceased relative if the memory of their character is besmirched by such publication. However there is a fruitful current debate regarding the alienability or transferability of these rights, in the United States specifically, in the spirit of limiting the free transfer of personality rights—as they are freely transferrable currently- to a more protective system to prevent improper access to a right so closely rooted in an individuals personality from a wrongdoer.

Personality rights have developed out of common law concepts of property, trespass and intentional tort. Thus personality rights are, generally speaking, judge-made law, though there are jurisdictions where some aspects of personality rights are statutory. Currently in the United States, all 50 states each have their own way of defining and enforcing the right of publicity, and this creates issues of uniformity across the country because each system is different and not "roughly parallel" to the other states. In some jurisdictions, publicity rights and privacy rights are not clearly distinguished, and the term publicity right is generally used. Liability does not turn on whether the public is deceived by the unauthorized uses.

The meaning of the law is best illustrated by principal cases on the subject.

== Country-specific jurisdictions ==
=== Australia ===
In Australia, false association or endorsement is actionable via the law of passing off, not a separate law of "right of personality". The Henderson case was a decision of the Supreme Court of New South Wales (both the first instance and appellate jurisdiction). The plaintiffs were ballroom dancers and they sued the defendant in passing off alleging it wrongfully published their photograph on the cover of a gramophone record entitled Strictly for Dancing: Vol. 1. An injunction was granted on the ground that the use suggested the plaintiffs recommended or approved of the defendant's goods, or had some connection with the goods.

However, in the 1988 case of Honey v Australian Airlines, Gary Honey, a well known Australian athlete, failed in his claim for damages after Australian Airlines used a photograph of him on a poster without his permission. The judge held, in essence, that the poster depicted excellence in general rather than a particular person.

=== Brazil ===
In Brazil, the right to one's image is protected by Article 5, subsection X, of the Federal Constitution and is a fundamental right.

The Civil Code, in Chapter II (On Personality Rights), Article 20:

Unless authorized, or unless necessary for the administration of justice or the maintenance of public order, the disclosure of written materials, the transmission of speech, or the publication, display, or use of a person’s image may be prohibited, upon that person’s request and without prejudice to any applicable compensation, if such acts harm that person’s honor, good reputation, or respectability, or if they are intended for commercial purposes.

=== Canada ===
==== Statutory protection ====
The provinces of British Columbia, Manitoba, Newfoundland and Labrador, and Saskatchewan have enacted privacy legislation dealing with personality rights, which have the following traits:

1. An appropriation of personality can be achieved through the use of a person's name, likeness, or voice (but British Columbia has a more restrictive definition).
2. The plaintiff must be identified or identifiable by the use made of their persona.
3. An action for the appropriation of personality can only succeed where the defendant intended to commit the wrong (but British Columbia has no "intention" requirement).
4. The defendant's use of the plaintiff's persona must have resulted in a gain or advantage for the defendant (but British Columbia has a more restrictive definition, relating only to commercial gain).
5. An appropriation of personality is actionable without proof of damages.
6. The right of action for appropriation of personality is extinguished upon the death of the person whose privacy was violated.
7. The following constitute statutory defences in all four provinces: (i) that the plaintiff consented to the use of their persona; (ii) that the use of the plaintiff's persona was incidental to the exercise of a lawful right of defence of person or property; (iii) that the use was authorized or required under a provincial law or by a court, or any process of a court; and (iv) that the act was that of a peace officer acting in the course of their duties. The Manitoba Act provides additional defences.

==== Common law provinces ====
Canadian common law recognizes a limited right to personality. It was first acknowledged in the 1971 Ontario decision of Krouse v. Chrysler Canada Ltd., where the Court held that where a person has marketable value in their likeness and it has been used in a manner that suggests an endorsement of a product then there is grounds for an action in appropriation of personality. This right was later expanded upon in Athans v. Canadian Adventure Camps (1977) where the Court held that the personality right included both image and name.

In Gould Estate v. Stoddart Publishing Co. Ltd. (1998), the Ontario Court of Appeal concluded that simply writing about somebody, even for the purpose of generating a profit, does not constitute appropriation of personality.

The general tort of appropriation of personality is still in development, but it is currently being argued that it will be recognized in all common law provinces, with certain characteristics:

1. Athans confirms that there is "a proprietary right in the exclusive marketing for gain of his personality, image and name..."
2. There is always a requirement that the plaintiff be identifiable.
3. An action for appropriation of personality will have to be intentional for a plaintiff to recover at common law.
4. There is a requirement that the defendant must have acted for the purpose of commercial gain, but Gould suggests that this may be restricted to "endorsement-type situations".
5. It is a matter of uncertainty whether the common law tort of appropriation of personality is actionable per se or whether damages must be shown.
6. Privacy rights are extinguished upon death, but personality rights are inheritable.
7. A defendant will not be liable for an appropriation of personality at common law where: (i) they have consented to the use of their persona; (ii) the use made of their personality rights was merely incidental to another purpose; or (iii) the publication constituted a matter of public interest.

==== Quebec ====
In 1994, the new Civil Code of Quebec introduced new provisions that enshrine the right to privacy as an attribute of personality:

3. Every person is the holder of personality rights, such as the right to life, the right to the inviolability and integrity of his person, and the right to the respect of his name, reputation and privacy. These rights are inalienable.

...

36. The following acts, in particular, may be considered as invasions of the privacy of a person:

(1) entering or taking anything in his dwelling;
(2) intentionally intercepting or using his private communications;
(3) appropriating or using his image or voice while he is in private premises;
(4) keeping his private life under observation by any means;
(5) using his name, image, likeness or voice for a purpose other than the legitimate information of the public;
(6) using his correspondence, manuscripts or other personal documents.

In Aubry v Éditions Vice-Versa Inc, the Supreme Court of Canada also affirmed that under Quebec's Charter of Human Rights and Freedoms privacy provisions, a photographer can take photographs in public places but may not publish the picture unless permission has been obtained from the subject, except where the subject appears in an incidental manner, or whose professional success depends on public opinion. The relevant provisions of the Charter are:

4. Every person has a right to the safeguard of his dignity, honour and reputation. 5. Every person has a right to respect for his private life.

Therefore, the following general characteristics may be drawn:

1. An appropriation of personality can be realized through the use of a person's name, likeness, or voice.
2. The plaintiff must be recognizable in order for an appropriation of personality to be actionable.
3. There is no need for the courts to look for an element of intent.
4. Distinctions based on commercial purposes are irrelevant, and inconsistent with § 9.1 of the Quebec Charter.
5. The plaintiff is required to show that they suffered damage through the appropriation of their personality rights.
6. Quebec law may allow an action to be taken by the estate of a deceased person, provided that it can be proved that there is a patrimonial aspect at stake.
7. A defendant will not be liable for an appropriation of personality under Quebec law where: (i) the plaintiff expressly or impliedly consented to the appropriation of their personality; (ii) the use of the individual's persona is incidental to another purpose; (iii) the appropriation of personality is authorized by law; or (iv) the publication is a matter of public interest.

=== Cyprus ===
In Cyprus, people depicted in photographs can oppose their use in advertisements and their publication in magazines, even if it was taken in a public place.

=== Denmark ===
In Denmark, the Danish Penal Code chapters 26 and 27, provides certain personality rights. The governmental Danish Data Protection Agency, has made a declaration regarding publication on the Internet of pictures taken of persons in a public area:

The predominant point of reference, is that any publication of a portrait photograph requires consent [of the person depicted]. The reasoning for this, is that such a publication might provide the depicted person with discomfort, possibly with other information such as name, of the publication for all with access to the internet, and the considerations of this discomfort is judged as more important than a possible interest in publication.

A portrait photograph is defined as a photograph, with the purpose of depicting one or more specific person(s). The personality rights however may be contracted for persons who are generally accepted as public persons.

=== France ===
In France, personality rights are protected under article 9 of the French civil code. While publicly known facts and images of public figures are not generally protected, use of someone's image or personal history has been held actionable under French law. The most famous case in recent history is perhaps the publication of the book on François Mitterrand called Le Grand Secret in which Mitterrand's doctor published a book that not only revealed private facts about Mitterrand's life, but also revealed medical confidences protected by doctor–patient privilege.

Publishing private information and invasion of privacy, and imposing one year imprisonment and €45,000 fine.

=== Germany ===
In Germany, personality rights are protected under the German civil code, where the concept of an "absolute person of contemporary history" allows the depiction of individuals who are part of history but still gives them some protection of their rights of privacy outside the public sphere. A succinct statement of the German law can be found in the following judicial statement from the Marlene Dietrich case: the general right of personality has been recognised in the case law of the German Federal Court of Justice since 1954 as a basic right constitutionally guaranteed by Articles 1 and 2 of the Basic Law and at the same time as an "other right" protected in civil law under § 823 (1) of the BGB (established case law since BGHZ 13, 334, 338—readers' letters). It guarantees as against all the world the protection of human dignity and the right to free development of the personality. Special forms of manifestation of the general right of personality are the right to one's own picture (§§ 22 ff. of the KUG) and the right to one's name (§ 12 of the BGB). They guarantee protection of the personality for the sphere regulated by them.

In addition to the general personality rights, there are special rules that forbid taking intimate pictures without consent (§ 184k StGB), and that forbid taking pictures which violate the "most personal sphere" of those pictured (§ 201 StGB—in particular, photos of private situations such as inside the bedroom, and photos of helpless persons, such as accident victims). In contrast to the general rules about the right to one's image, these rules also apply to just taking images, not only to publishing them.

=== Greece ===
The relevant Greek laws include 57 AK and 2472/1997. As regarding photography:

- Taking a picture of a person in a public space: Requires consent. Taking a photo or video of someone or drawing them in a painting constitutes an illegal act by itself according to Article 57 of the Greek Civil Code (57 ΑΚ, 57 Αστικός Κώδικας) even without any publication of the resulting photo, video or drawing. The law assumes that consent has been provided silently if the depicted person has been paid for the photography session. The law also provides some exceptions for persons of contemporary history. Furthermore, the law 2472/1997 also applies in many circumstances, even in photographing political rallies in public places or in photographing the police; Greece also requires photographers to obtain a government permit before photographing people participating in political protests in public places.
- Publishing pictures of a person in a public space: Requires consent. The publication of photographs of identifiable police officers beating civilians in public places may be against the law 2472/1997 and as such these images should be turned to the authorities for review.
- Commercial use of a published picture of a person in a public space: Requires consent.

=== Guernsey ===
The relevant Guernsey law was enacted on 3 December 2012 under the name of Image Rights Bailiwick of Guernsey Ordinance 2012 and allows for the registration of a personality right, together with images associated with that personality. Images are widely defined and can be any number of personal attributes, such as likeness, mannerisms, gestures, voice, nickname etc.

Personalities able to register fall into 5 categories, namely sole, joint, group, legal and fictional character. In addition, humans can be registered up to 100 years after the date of death, making the law very favourable for estate managers and trustees.

=== Hong Kong ===
In Hong Kong, as in most other common law jurisdictions, there is no separate "personality right", and false association or endorsement is actionable under the law of passing off. The main case on this point relates to Cantopop singer/actor Andy Lau and Hang Seng Bank over the allegedly unauthorized use of Lau's image on credit cards, which has led to the observation that only limited personality rights exist in this jurisdiction.

=== India ===
in 2025, Many indian celebrates include Aishwarya Rai, who went to the Delhi High Court because of AI misinterpretation and misinfomation.

=== Iran ===
There are few studies on the right to fame in Iranian law. However, through general principles, an attempt has been made to support celebrities.

=== Jamaica ===
In a 1994 case involving the estate of Bob Marley, the Supreme Court of Jamaica acknowledged a property right of personality which survived his death.

=== Japan ===
In October 2007, J-pop duo Pink Lady sued Kobunsha for ¥3.7 million after the publisher's magazine Josei Jishin used photos of the duo on an article on dieting through dancing without their permission. The case was rejected by the Tokyo District Court. In February 2012, the Supreme Court rejected the duo's appeal based on the right of publicity.

=== Portugal ===
In Portugal, personality rights are protected under the "tutela geral da personalidade" on article 70 of the Portuguese Civil Code and, also, in article 17 of the Constitution of the Portuguese Republic. Some personality rights, like the right to image or honor are specifically typified in the civil code in the articles following the "tutela geral". Specifically regarding image rights, article 79 of the Portuguese Civil Code states that an image of a person cannot be published or exposed without their consent, even after the person's death (in which case the consent is to be obtained from existing family or heirs). However, consent is not needed for public personalities when in their public roles, for use in scientific, didactic or cultural purposes, or when the image is produced in a public setting. However, if the image harms the honor, reputation or decorum of the person it cannot be reproduced or exposed without consent.

=== People's Republic of China ===
In the People's Republic of China, rights of personality are established by statute. According to article 100 and 101 of the General Principle of Civil Law of the People's Republic of China, the right of name and the right of image are protected. It is prohibited to use another's image for commercial use without that person's consent. In the new Tort Liabilities Law which came into effect on Jan 1, 2021, the right of privacy is mentioned for the first time in the legislation.

=== South Africa ===
In South Africa, personality rights are protected under the South African law of delict and the Bill of Rights, which also provides for freedom of expression and freedom of association. After much uncertainty concerning the recognition of image rights in South Africa, the Supreme Court of Appeal provided clarity in the landmark case of Grütter v Lombard. In South Africa, a person's right to identity is violated if the attributes of that person is used without permission in a way which cannot be reconciled with the true image of that person. Apart from the unauthorized use of a person's image, this kind of infringement also entails some kind of misrepresentation concerning the individual, such as that the individual approves or endorses a particular product or service or that an attorney is a partner in a firm, while this is not the case. Secondly, the right to identity is violated if the attributes of a person is used without authorization by another person for commercial gain. Apart from the unauthorized use of the individual's image, such use also primarily entails a commercial motive which is exclusively aimed at promoting a service or product or to solicit clients or customers. The mere fact that the user may benefit or profit from any product or service in respect of which the individual's attributes have incidentally been used, is not in itself sufficient. This violation of the right to identity therefore also entails unauthorized use of the individual's attributes with a commercial purpose, whether it is done by means of advertisement or the manufacture and distribution of merchandise covered with the attributes of the individual. Personality rights are not absolute and it goes without saying that the use of a person's attributes must be unlawful before a plaintiff will succeed with any claim. With the use of a person's image, the personality rights, privacy, human dignity and freedom of association of the individual must often be weighed against the user's right to freedom of expression. The use of a person's image can be justified on the grounds of consent, truth and public interest, fair comment and jest.

=== South Korea ===
In South Korea, as defined in the Civil Code, section 751:

A person who has injured the person, liberty or fame of another or has inflicted any mental anguish to another person shall be liable to make compensation for damages arising therefrom.

While the concept of personality rights is recognized, it is not yet widely known. The Korean terminology ("인격표지영리권", literally translated to "personality sign commercial rights") is still much less frequently used compared to the transcription of the English term "publicity rights".

Nor any independent law on personality rights exist in South Korea (as of October 2023). However, in 2022, a related provision was enacted under the existing Unfair Competition Prevention Act. This revision is considered to have provided a foundation for an independent Act in near future. Much change is expected as it has been reported that around 80% of Korean entertainment agencies voiced difficulties in publicity right violations of their talents.

On December 26, 2022, the Ministry of Justice announced plans to stipulate personality rights in Civil Code in the near future. The most notable difference between the new law and the Publicity Rights provision under the Unfair Competition Prevention Act would be the expansion of scope; the new law will go beyond 'celebrities' and will recognize everyone's right to their name, portrait, voice, etc.

Personality rights are said to exist to some extent by both influence of constitution and tort liability, but cases filed to enforce such rights against shopping malls have been unsuccessful.

South Korea's portrait rights are too widely recognized compared to other countries. Because of this, it is common for South Korean media reports to blur people's faces in press photos, even though there is no problem of defamation. In contrast, most countries regard blur as a distortion of the truth. It is common that the public's faces photographed only in the South Korean media are blurred even when there in no possibility of defamation. Criticism has been raised against this.

=== Spain ===
According to the agency (Spanish) Data Protection for the collection and dissemination on Internet of images of a person without their consent may be a serious breach of the Data Protection Act which would be punishable by a minimum fine of 60,000 euros. According to El Mundo Data Protection Agency decided to investigate ex officio by the mere distribution of the image of a person on the Internet without their consent.

=== United States ===
In the United States, the right of publicity is based on state-level law, as opposed to federal, and recognition of the right can vary from state to state. The rationale underlying the right of publicity in the United States is rooted in both privacy and economic exploitation. The rights are based in tort law, and parallel Prosser's "Four Torts" which might be summarized as: 1) Intrusion upon physical solitude; 2) public disclosure of private facts; 3) depiction in a false light; and 4) appropriation of name and likeness. If looking at it through the prism of Prosser's four torts, violation of a right of publicity most closely aligns with appropriation. The right of publicity often is manifest in advertising or merchandise. In states without a specific right of publicity statute, the right of publicity is usually recognized via common law. The right of publicity has evolved rapidly, with a history of reported cases in the United States and worldwide. Additionally the right to publicity protects against performance, adaptation, personality products, endorsements, and reputation.

The right of publicity is defined as the right of all individuals to control commercial use of their names, images, likenesses, or other identifying aspects of identity. In certain contexts, the right of publicity is limited (under U.S. law) by the First Amendment. The right of publicity can be referred to as publicity rights or even personality rights. The term "right of publicity" was coined by Judge Jerome Frank in 1953.

The extent of recognition of this right in the U.S. is largely driven by statute or case law. Because the right of publicity is primarily governed by state (as opposed to federal) law, the degree of recognition of the right of publicity can vary from one state to the next. The right of publicity is not simply an analog to trademark law, though it could be noted that the right of publicity has some commonality with the protection of trademarks as long as one understands that the right of publicity is a distinct legal doctrine, with its own policies, objectives and standards, including notable differences from trademark law. For example, falsity or likelihood of confusion generally do not have to be established to present a colorable right of publicity claim.

At a national level, the U.S. Supreme Court held in the 1977 case Zacchini v. Scripps-Howard Broadcasting Co. that the First Amendment did not immunize a television station from liability for broadcasting Hugo Zacchini's human cannonball act without his consent. This was the first, and so far the only, U.S. Supreme Court ruling on rights of publicity and it served to confirm the overall validity of the doctrine and the interests it protects.

Indiana has one of the stronger right of publicity statutes in the U.S., providing recognition of the right for 100 years after death, and protecting not only the usual "name, image and likeness", but also signature, photograph, gestures, distinctive appearances, and mannerisms. Notably, Oklahoma also provides 100 years of protection after death, and Tennessee's statute provides rights that do not ever expire if use is continuous. There are other notable characteristics of the Indiana law, though most of the major movement in right of publicity emanates from New York and California, with a significant body of case law which suggest potentially contradictory positions with respect to recognition of the right of publicity under certain circumstances.

Some states recognize the right through statute and some others through common law. California has both statutory and common-law strains of authority protecting slightly different forms of the right. The right of publicity shares characteristics of a property right and as such is transferable to the person's heirs after their death. The Celebrities Rights Act was passed in California in 1985 and it extended the personality rights for a celebrity to 70 years after their death. Previously, the 1979 Lugosi v. Universal Pictures decision by the California Supreme Court held that Bela Lugosi's personality rights could not pass to his heirs.

- In October 1990, actor Crispin Glover filed a lawsuit against Universal Studios for both the unauthorized use of his likeness and the use of footage of him from Back to the Future in Back to the Future Part II; his permission had not been sought for the latter and he received no payment. After a motion to dismiss was denied, the case was settled for an undisclosed amount. The Screen Actors Guild changed its rules to prohibit its members from unauthorized mimicking of other SAG members.
- In September 2002, Tom Cruise and Nicole Kidman sued luxury cosmetics company Sephora for allegedly using a picture of them without permission in a brochure promoting perfumes.
- In March 2003, eight members of the cast of The Sopranos alleged that electronics retailer Best Buy used their images in newspaper ads without permission.
- In the July 2003 case of ETW Corp. v. Jireh Publishing ruled that a painting of the golfer Tiger Woods and others is protected by the US Constitution's First Amendment and treads neither on the golfer's trademarks nor publicity rights. Similarly in the July 2003 case of Johnny and Edgar Winter v. DC Comics, a depiction of blues musicians Johnny and Edgar Winter in a comic book as worms called the Autumn Brothers obtained First Amendment protection from publicity rights suit. In May 2005, Toney v. Oreal USA Inc. clarified the distinction between the purview of copyright versus the nature of publicity rights.
- The 2006 New York County Supreme Court case Nussenzweig v. DiCorcia, after dismissing the complaint on statute of limitations grounds, held in the alternative that personality rights are limited by First Amendment rights of artistic freedom of expression. (Note: In New York, the "Supreme Court" is a trial-level court, equivalent to what is called "Superior Court" or "Circuit Court" in other states. The court equivalent to what most states call a "Supreme Court" is the New York Court of Appeals.) The decision was affirmed on appeal by the Appellate Division and the Court of Appeals, but those courts only addressed the statute of limitations holding, not the First Amendment holding.
- In 2008, a federal judge in California ruled that Marilyn Monroe's right of publicity were not protectable in California. The court reasoned that even though Monroe died in California, she was legally domiciled in New York at the time of her death, and New York does not protect a celebrity's deceased right of publicity and that her right of publicity ended upon her death.
- In the 2009 case of James "Jim" Brown v. Electronic Arts, Inc., the United States District Court for the Central District of California dismissed athlete Jim Brown's theory of false endorsement under the Lanham Act and determined that the First Amendment protects the unauthorized use of a trademark in an artistic work when the mark has artistic relevance to the work and does not explicitly mislead as to the source or content of the work. Applying this test, the court found a lack of implied endorsement and held that the First Amendment protected Electronic Arts in its use of a virtual football player that resembled Brown.
- In 2019, Emily Ratajkowski was sued by photographer Robert O'Neil for copyright infringement when she posted a paparazzi picture taken by O'Neil depicting Ratajkowski outside of a flower shop in Manhattan. The picture showed Ratajkowski with a bouquet of flowers covering her face, and Ratajkowski added the caption, "mood forever", when she posted the image to her Instagram story. The parties ultimately settled the copyright claim out of court, but the dispute raised right of publicity concerns given the use of Ratajkowski's portrait and picture under the New York right of publicity statute. However, courts have historically found licensing or publishing these images as non-commercial uses, complicating the right of publicity argument. Emily Ratajkowski now faces a similar copyright infringement suit for posting another photographer's paparazzi picture of her to her Instagram account.
- On April 29, 2020, the NCAA Board of Governors supported proposed rules for college athletes expected to take effect in 2021. The rules would allow athletes to be paid for use of their name, image and likeness (NIL) in endorsements and appearances.

==== U.S. jurisdictions that recognize rights of publicity ====
- Alabama (common law)
- Arkansas (statute)
- California (statute and common law) (see Celebrities Rights Act)
- Connecticut (common law)
- District of Columbia (common law)
- Florida (statute)
- Georgia (common law)
- Hawaii (statute)
- Idaho (common law)
- Illinois (statute)
- Indiana (statute)
- Kentucky (statute and common law)
- Massachusetts (statute)
- Michigan (common law)
- Minnesota (common law)
- Missouri (common law)
- Nebraska (statute)
- Nevada (statute)
- New Jersey (common law)
- New York (statute)
- Ohio (common law)
- Oklahoma (statute)
- Pennsylvania (common law)
- Rhode Island (statute)
- South Dakota (statute)
- Tennessee (statute)
- Texas (common law)
- Utah (statute and common law)
- Virginia (statute)
- Washington (statute)
- Wisconsin (statute and common law)

California Civil Code Section 3344(a) states:

Any person who knowingly uses another's name, voice, signature, photograph, or likeness, in any manner, on or in products, merchandise, or goods, or for purposes of advertising or selling, or soliciting purchases of, products, merchandise, goods or services, without such person's prior consent, or, in the case of a minor, the prior consent of his parent or legal guardian, shall be liable for any damages sustained by the person or persons injured as a result thereof.

== See also ==
- Beneficial ownership
- Celebrities Rights Act
- Data broker
- Defamation
- Honour
- Individual and group rights
- Model release
- Moral rights
- Public records

== Sources ==
- Conroy, Amy M. (2012). "Protecting Your Personality Rights in Canada: A Matter of Property or Privacy?". Western Journal of Legal Studies. 1 (1). University of Western Ontario.
