= Gal Sone =

Japanese competitive eater and singer (born 1985)

- Born: Natsuko Sone; December 4, 1985 (age 40); Maizuru, Kyoto, Japan
- Occupation: Competitive eater

Japanese name
- Kanji: 曽根 菜津子
Transcriptions
- Romanization: Sone Natsuko

Gal Sone (ギャル曽根, Gyaru Sone; born Natsuko Sone (曽根 菜津子, Sone Natsuko) on December 4, 1985, in Maizuru, Kyoto) is a female Japanese competitive eater and singer. Her popularity has helped produce a resurgence in Japanese competitive eating, or ōgui, after the outcry following the death of a Japanese schoolboy imitating an eating stunt in 2002 resulted in a three-year break for major Japanese eating contests.

== Contest history ==
In TV Tokyo's "Gluttonous King" contest held in the fall of 2005, open to both men and women, Sone qualified for the finals and beat out Miyuki Iwata, then considered the leading Japanese female competitive eater after the legendary (and currently inactive) Takako Akasaka, for sixth place by just 6 grams of bread. TV Tokyo followed up its mixed gender contest with a women's only contest in the spring of 2006 in Okinawa. Sone easily won the event and had a comfortable enough lead in the final contest that she could afford to fix her makeup while the contest clock was running. Gal Sone improved to 3rd from 6th in the fall 2006 "Gluttonous King" contest, held in Hokkaidō and retained her crown in the spring 2007 "Gluttonous Queen" contest in Hawaii.

In addition to her "Gluttonous King/Queen" competitions, Sone has made numerous other television appearances, most notably a weekly Wednesday morning contest with "The Giant" Nobuyuki Shirota, runner-up in Nathan's Hot Dog Eating Contest in 2004. On July 11, 2006, Sone ate 6 kg of curry in 23 minutes (Shirota required 14 minutes) In another telecast, the "Gal" consumed 40,000 calories in several restaurants. In a recent program, Gal Sone attempted in a single meal to exceed the 15,000 calories that it is claimed that Elvis Presley consumed every day near the end of his life.

When an X-ray was performed on her stomach, it appeared to be normal size, but its connection to the small intestine was larger than normal.

Gal Sone has appeared in a commercial for Aoki's Pizza, who created a mayonnaise pizza in her honor. Mayonnaise sauce is her favourite sauce.

== Music career ==
Sone appeared in two karaoke television programs in late 2006. On one show, she ate sushi quickly during an instrumental section of her song. On April 24, 2007, it was announced that Sone would form a singing group directed by Tsunku named Gyaruru with Nozomi Tsuji and Ami Tokito. On May 14, 2007, after Tsuji's resignation from the band, Asami Abe joined in her place. Their first single, "Boom Boom Meccha Maccho!" (Boom Boom めっちゃマッチョ!, boom boom very macho!), was released on June 20, 2007 on Japanese independent label TN-mix through Pony Canyon. Sone's nickname in Gyaruru is Sonene.
