= Madison Avenue Pizza =

Pizzeria in Dunedin, Florida, U.S.

- Type: Private
- Founded: 2016; 10 years ago
- Founder: Sean and Jackie Ferraro
- Headquarters: Dunedin, USA
- Products: Pizza
- Website: madisonavepizza.com

Madison Avenue Pizza is a family-owned pizzeria based in Dunedin, Florida. It was founded in 2016 by Sean and Jackie Ferraro.

== Background ==
Sean Ferraro was born in Largo to a restaurant owners' Italian family, and graduated from the Florida State University College of Hospitality. At the age of 14, Ferraro started working in a pizzeria. In 2016, Ferraro and his wife Jackie sold their house in South Florida and their cars to get the funding for Madison Avenue Pizza, and relocated to Dunedin to start the restaurant.

On Saturdays, Ferraro sells pizza by boat across Tampa Bay for swimmers and people on other boats whom call him Pizza Skiff Guy.

== That's What She Said Pizza challenge ==
The pizzeria is known for offering a competitive eating challenge named That's What She Said Pizza where a participant team of 2 people have 1 hour to finish a 1-topping 32-inch in diameter (10-11 lbs) pizza, which is considered the largest pizza in Tampa, Florida. Notable participants included, Miki Sudo, Nick Wehry, Randy Santel, Katina DeJarnett, Dan Kennedy, Nathan Figueroa, Michael Jenkins and Ricardo Corbucci.

== Fare ==
Madison Avenue Pizza serves New York-style pizza, which is baked in brick pizza ovens. All Madison Avenue Pizza's products are made from fresh ingredients and cooked the old-fashioned way.

== Accolades ==
Madison Avenue Pizza won "Best Pizza" in Creative Loafing Tampa Bay's annual Best of the Bay awards for seven consecutive years, from 2020 through 2026. In 2026, it also won "Best Philly Cheesesteak" and "Best Dunedin Restaurant". Madison Avenue Pizza was included in Creative Loafing Tampa Bay's list of "Tampa Bay's 50 best restaurants of 2021".
