= David O'Karma =

American competitive eater

David "Coondog" O'Karma is a competitive eating champion, entertainer, and writer from Cuyahoga Falls, Ohio. He was formerly a member of the IFOCE, but is now the director of a Competitive Eating organization called the Association of Independent Competitive Eaters (AICE).

== Competitive eating ==
He started competitive eating at age 15 in Cuyahoga Falls, at Church's Chicken on Portage Trail. He ate 13 sweet potato pies in one minute to become the WCUE Sweet Potato Pie-eating Champion. From there he entered the Hoolihan and Big Chuck Show's Pizza Fight of the Century and became the only other person (besides Robert "Wild Mouth" Tilk) to defeat champion eater Mariano "Mushmouth" Pacetti.

On July 4, 1974, Coondog set his first world record by eating 45 hard-boiled eggs in 8 minutes and 10 seconds, becoming the WCUE Egg-Sucking Champion. Later that summer, at the Cuyahoga Falls Kid's Carnival.

In 2001, Coondog O'Karma came out of a self-imposed retirement of 27 years to win the Nathan's Famous Middletown, New York regional hotdog eating contest, qualifying him for the Nathan's Famous Coney Island 4th of July Hotdog Eating Contest in Coney Island where he finished in 7th with 17 hotdogs.

Over the course of his career, he has held world records in doughnut, hard-boiled egg and corn on the cob consumption. In addition to American events, Coondog has also traveled to Japan for a Sushi eating competition and to meet with Takeru Kobayashi. He has been ranked as high as 14th in the world by the IFOCE.

In addition to these successes, however, there have been letdowns in his career. He was disqualified from the 2002 Wing Bowl after vomiting. He had eaten over 100 wings by that point. He eventually retired from Competitive Eating due to his family's concerns about its effect on his health.

In April 2006 Jason Fagone's book on competitive eating, Horsemen of the Esophagus, featured Coondog as one of three competitive eaters profiled in the book.

== Writing ==
In addition to competitive eating, Coondog writes poetry and essays. In April 2004 Coondog published his first volume of poetry under the title "Wit and Whimsy of a White Trash Jesus." Several of his writings have won awards, including the Ohio Excellence in Journalism Awards first place in the Open Essay category.

== Event promotion ==
In August 2006 Coondog co-hosted the National Hamburger Festival in Akron, Ohio. The festival was held to honor local food innovators Frank and Charles Menches, who claimed to have invented the hamburger in 1885. The festival included a hamburger eating contest, which O'Karma won.

In 2002 he left the IFOCE after conflicts occurred with its owner, George Shea. He disagreed with IFOCE management regarding several issues, including concerns about the health and pay of competitive eaters. He later joined forces with a smaller competitive eating league, the Association of Independent Competitive Eaters (AICE), which was established by his friend eater Arnie "Chowhound" Chapman. He now serves as the Director of Operations for the AICE.

== Personal life ==
Coondog was born in Akron, Ohio, and was raised in Cuyahoga Falls, Ohio. He attended Cuyahoga Falls High School, where he was a varsity swimmer. Coondog later attended Kent State University and has worked as a painter and construction contractor. He is married with two children.
