= Horsemen of the Esophagus =

2006 book by Jason Fagone

- First edition cover
- Author: Jason Fagone
- Cover artist: Tamaye Perry
- Language: English
- Subject: Competitive eating
- Genre: Non-fiction
- Publisher: Crown Publishers
- Publication date: 2006
- Publication place: United States
- Media type: Print (Hardback & Paperback)
- Pages: 303 pp
- ISBN: 0-307-23738-9
- OCLC: 63108324
- Dewey Decimal: 641/.013 22
- LC Class: TX631 .F43 2006

Horsemen of the Esophagus by Jason Fagone is a nonfiction book about the sport of competitive eating and the outsized American appetite. Horsemen follows three American "gurgitators" during a year on the pro eating circuit: Ohio housepainter David "Coondog" O'Karma, South Jersey truck driver Bill "El Wingador" Simmons, and Manhattan day-trader Tim "Eater X" Janus. Horseman makes stops at 27 competitive eating contests around the world, including the Nathan's Famous Hot Dog Eating Contest at Coney Island and includes an interview with Nathan's champion at the time, Takeru Kobayashi.
