= Keiner =

Keiner is a German surname. Notable people with the surname include:

- Michael Keiner (born 1959), German poker player
- Steve Keiner, American competitive eater
- Walter Keiner (1890–1978), German general
