= Fagone =

Fagone is an Italian surname. Notable people with the surname include:

- Jason Fagone (fl. 2002), American journalist and author
- Orazio Fagone (born 1968), Italian sledge hockey player and short track speed skater
