= Gutbusters =

Gutbuster or Gutbusters may refer to:

- Gutbusters (film), a 2002 documentary following three competitors in the Nathan's International Hot Dog Eating Contest
- The Gutbuster (race), an annual race up Baldwin Street, Dunedin — reputedly the world's steepest street
- Gutbuster (professional wrestling), a type of throw
