= Michelle Lesco =

American competitive eater

- Born: Tucson, Arizona, United States
- Occupation: Competitive eater

Michelle Cristeen Lesco is an American competitive eater. She is the 2021 women's champion in the Nathan's Hot Dog Eating Contest, with 30.75 hot dogs and buns consumed in 10 minutes on July 4, 2021, ending Miki Sudo's 7-year reign. She has also competed in other eating competitions as well such as pie-eating, chicken wing eating, oyster eating, fudge eating, and others. She was named Major League Eating's Humanitarian of the Year.

== Early life ==
Lesco graduated from Eastern Arizona College in 2003 with an Associate of Arts in General Studies, graduated from University of Arizona in 2012 with a Bachelor of Arts in psychology with minors in history and sociology, and received her teacher certification from Pima Community College in 2014.

== Career ==
Lesco finished in second to Miki Sudo in the 2017, 2018, and 2019 Nathan's Hot Dog Eating Contests before winning in 2021, when Sudo did not compete because of her pregnancy. She is the third woman to win the Pink Mustard Belt since the contest was started in 2011.

Lesco has also competed in other events, including eating 10.5 pounds of boysenberry pie and 158 chicken wings in 10 minutes. In 2016, she won the Turkish Airlines World Oyster Eating Championship by consuming 227 oysters in three minutes, defeating a ten-time champion. On March 30, 2024 Lesco ate five pounds of chocolate fudge from Uranus during the Inaugural Eating Uranus Fudge Galactic Championship at Uranus, Missouri, placing 8th in the competition.

Lesco is a math teacher at Roberts Naylor k-8 School in Tucson. She has been teaching since 2012.

=== Nathan's Famous Hot Dog Eating Contest results ===
| 2026 Contest | 22 | 2nd place |
| 2025 Contest | 22 | 2nd place |
| 2024 Contest | 23.75 | 3rd place |
| 2023 Contest | 24 | 3rd place |
| 2022 Contest | 25 | 2nd place |
| 2021 Contest | 30.75 | 1st place |
| 2019 Contest | 26.5 | 2nd place |
| 2018 Contest | 28 | 2nd place |
| 2017 Contest | 32 | 2nd place |
| 2016 Contest | 27 | T-3rd place |
| 2015 Contest | 26 | 4th place |
| 2014 Contest | 27 | 3rd place |
| 2013 Contest | 27.5 | 3rd place |
| 2012 Contest | 25.5 | 3rd place |
| 2011 Contest | 20 | 4th place |

== Humanitarian work ==
Lesco was named Major League Eating's Humanitarian of the Year, working as the senior manager of Youth Services at the Volunteer Center of Southern Arizona, and donating both time and money to clean water initiatives in the Central African Republic's Bakota Liberté Village and Ethiopia's Adi Atsgeba Village and Adikokob Elementary School as well as the village of Geremu in Malawi.
