= Edward Jarvis =

Edward Jarvis may refer to:

- Edward Jarvis (businessman) (died c. 1800), Hudson's Bay Company factor and explorer
- Edward Jarvis (physician) (1803–1884), American physician
- Edward B. Jarvis, British film editor
- Edward "Cookie" Jarvis, Competitive eater
- Edward James Jarvis (1788–1852), Canadian lawyer, judge, and politician
- Edward Jarvis (author), British author of religious history and theology
