= Edward "Cookie" Jarvis =

American competitive eater

Edward “Cookie” Jarvis is a retired competitive eater and a member of the International Federation of Competitive Eating (IFOCE). He is a real estate agent, married father of two, and cancer survivor.

== Career ==
When Cookie Jarvis became a competitive eater in 2001, he was 365 pounds. When he retired in 2006 he had reached 525 pounds. His best finish in the Nathan's Hot Dog Eating Contest came in 2003, when he set an American record of 30½ hot dogs in 10 minutes. This put him in second place behind Takeru Kobayashi.

Edward Jarvis has made 31 television appearances according to his own website. He was featured on the 2002 broadcast "The Glutton Bowl" on Fox Network coming in second place behind Oleg Zhornitskiy in the mayonnaise eating competition. Jarvis was also featured in the 2002 Discovery Channel documentary "Gutbusters".

Ed Jarvis holds more competitive eating titles than anyone in the world. He is perhaps best known for becoming World Ice Cream Eating Champion by finishing one gallon, nine ounces of ice cream in 12 minutes. He competed in the 2002 Carnegie Deli pickle eating contest in May 2002 losing a very controversial close decision to Beautifulbrian Seiken only to regain the title in 2004

== Records ==
- 2003: Chicken-Fried Steak: 6 11-ounce chicken fried steaks with country gravy, Lone Star Cafe, 12 minutes
- 2005: French Fries: 4.46 pounds Nathan's Famous Crinkle Cut Fries, 6 minutes
- 2005: Grapes: 8 Pounds, 15 Ounces Grapes, Smirnoff Twisted V Wild Grape, 10 minutes
- Dumplings: 91 in eight minutes
- Chicken wings: 2 pounds, 2½ ounces in five minutes
- Specialty—kosher ice cream: 1 gallon, 9 ounces in 12 minutes
- Beat Andrew "The Eater" Rodgers in Krystal Square-Off.
