= Michael DeVito =

American competitive eater

- Born: 1961 (age 64–65)
- Occupations: Competitive eater, accountant

Michael "The Scholar" DeVito (born 1961) is a competitive eater and hot dog eating champion, and three-time winner of the Nathan's Hot Dog Eating Contest (in 1990, 1993 and 1994). "Mr. DeVito ate 20 hot dogs yesterday at the annual July 4th hot dog-eating contest on Coney Island, assuring him victory for the fourth time in five years." DeVito is 6 feet 2 inches and weighs just over 200 pounds (pre-competition). He set a personal best, eating 20 hot dogs, buns included, in the standard 12-minute competition period.

DeVito is a resident of Manalapan Township, New Jersey.

He also works as an accountant.
