= Dominic Cardo =

Competitive eater

Dominick “The Doginator” Cardo is an American competitive eater and a member of the International Federation of Competitive Eating (IFOCE). In 2001, he was featured on Glutton Bowl where he took first place in pickled cow tongue. Dominic is currently the IFOCE record holder for whole pickled beef tongue, at 3 pounds 3 ounces in 12 minutes.

== Records ==
- 2005: Second place, Long Island Roast Beef Sandwich Eating Championship
- 2001: First place, Glutton Bowl pickled beef tongue and still current record holder 3lbs 3oz.
