= Nathan's Hot Dog Eating Contest =

American food eating competition

Coordinates: 40°34′31.12″N 73°58′53.11″W

Nathan's Famous International Hot Dog Eating Contest
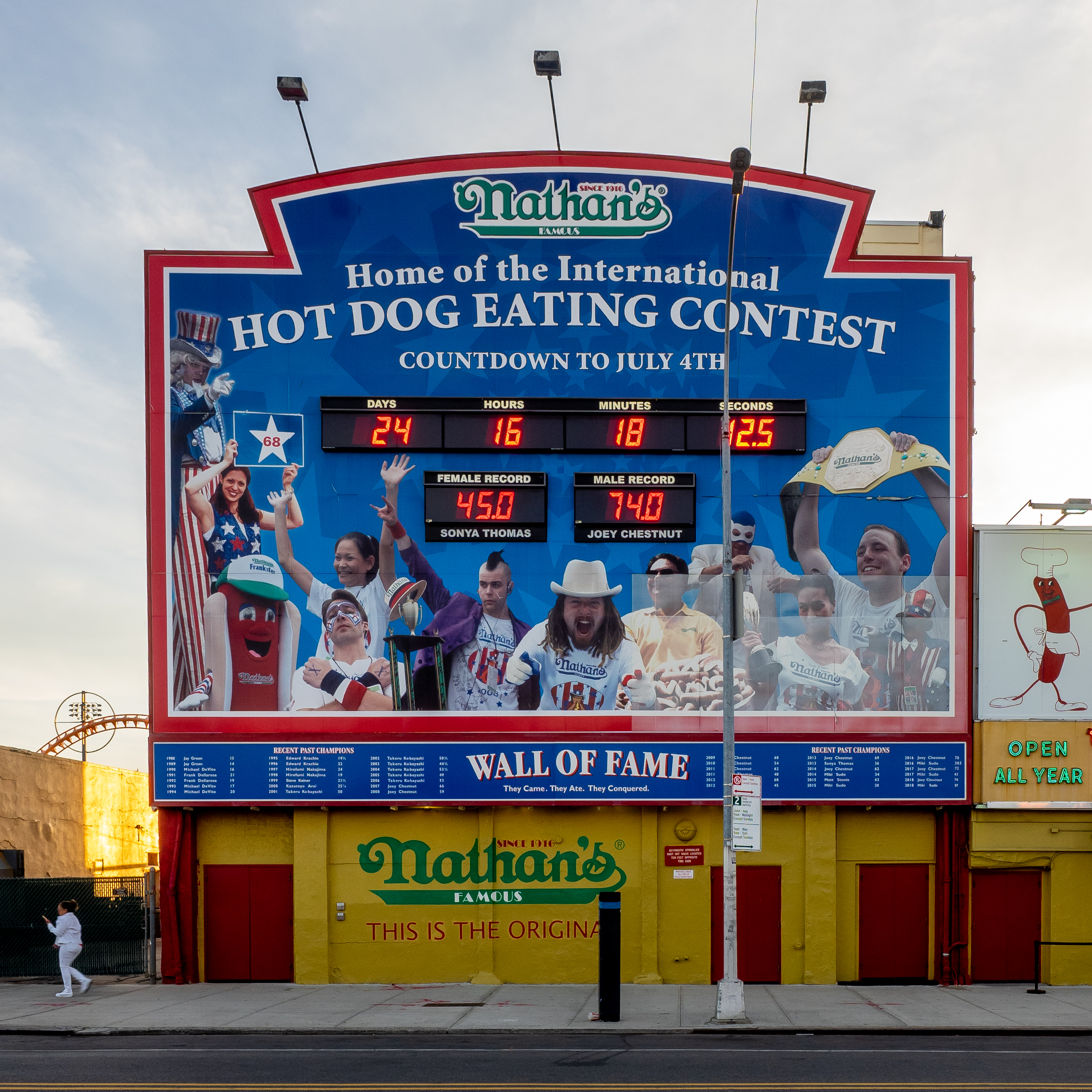
- Nathan's Wall of Fame of contest winners, 2019
- Status: Active
- Genre: Hot dog competitive eating competition
- Date: July 4
- Frequency: Annually
- Venue: Nathan's Famous Corporation
- Locations: Brooklyn, New York City
- Country: United States
- Inaugurated: June 30, 1967
- Website: Official website

The Nathan's Famous International Hot Dog Eating Contest is an annual American hot dog competitive eating competition. It is held each year on July 4 at Nathan's Famous's original, and best-known, restaurant at the corner of Surf and Stillwell Avenues in Coney Island, a neighborhood of Brooklyn, New York City.

The contest has gained public attention since the mid-2000s due to the stardom of Takeru "The Tsunami" Kobayashi and Joey Chestnut. The defending men's champion is Joey Chestnut, who ate 66 hot dogs in the 2026 contest. The defending women's champion is Miki Sudo, who ate 51 hot dogs at the 2024 event, and who won the 2026 event with 38.75.

== Rules ==
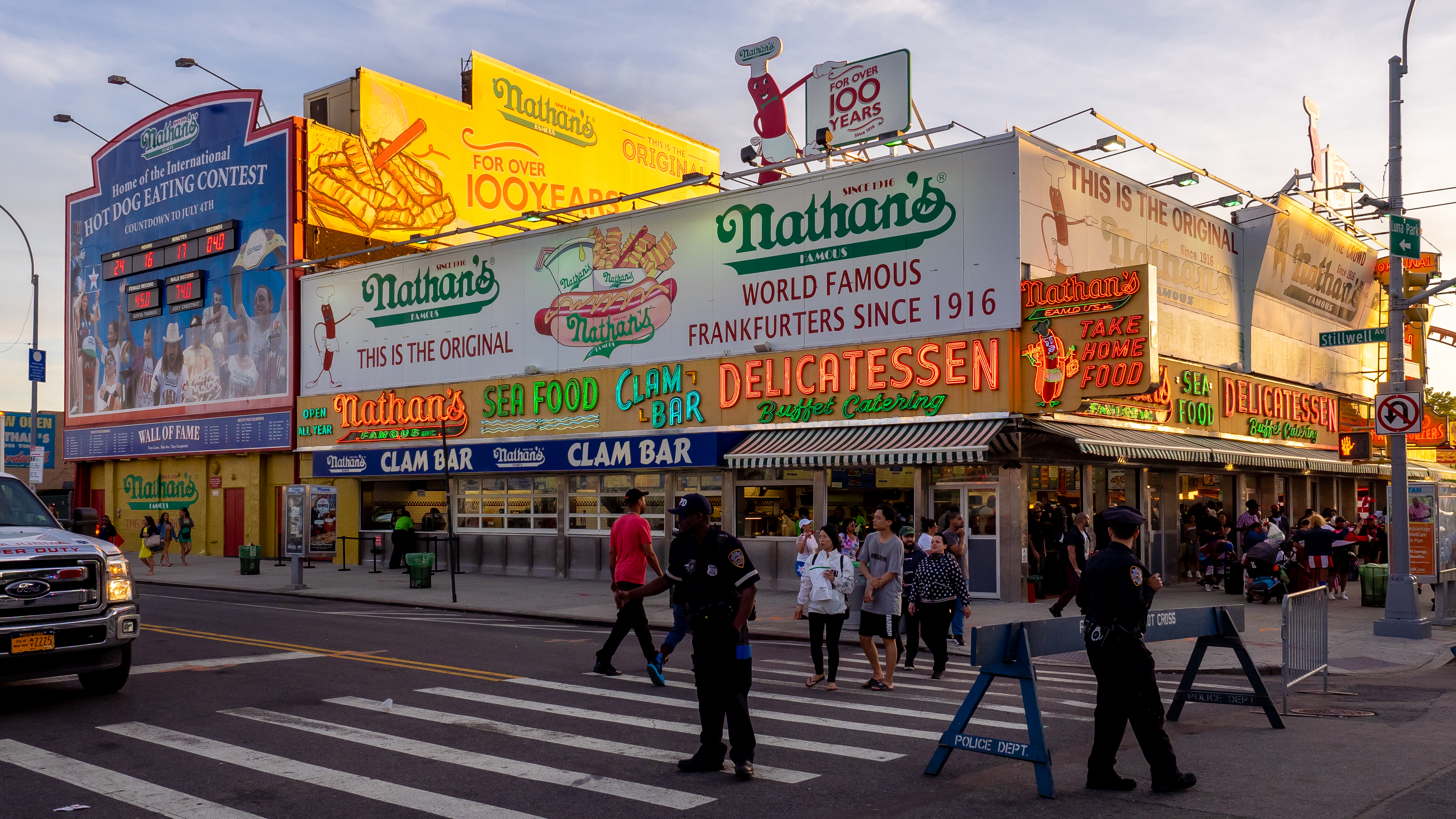
Nathan's original Coney Island location

Major League Eating (MLE), sanctioned by the International Federation of Competitive Eating (IFOCE), has sanctioned the event since 1997. Today, only entrants currently under contract by MLE can compete in the contest.

The field of about 20 contestants typically includes the following:

- any past champion;
- winners of a regional qualifying contest for that season;
- individuals qualifying as one of two wildcards (highest two average qualifier scores without winning a single qualifier); and
- those invited by special invitation of the MLE.

The competitors stand on a raised platform behind a long table with drinks and Nathan's Famous hot dogs in buns. Most contestants have water on hand, but other kinds of drinks can and have been used. Condiments are allowed, but usually are not used. The hot dogs are allowed to cool slightly after grilling to prevent possible mouth burns. The contestant who consumes (and keeps down) the most hot dogs and buns (HDB) in ten minutes is declared the winner. The length of the contest has changed over the years, previously 12 minutes, and in some years, only three and a half minutes; since 2008, 10 minutes.

Spectators watch and cheer on the eaters from close proximity. A designated scorekeeper is paired with each contestant, flipping a number board counting each hot dog consumed. Partially eaten hot dogs count and the granularity of measurement is eighths of a length. Hot dogs still in the mouth at the end of regulation count if they are subsequently swallowed. Yellow penalty cards can be issued for "messy eating", and red penalty cards can be issued for "reversal of fortune" (vomiting), which results in disqualification. If there is a tie, the contestants go to a 5-hot-dog eat-off to see who can eat that many the quickest. Further ties will result in a sudden-death eat-off of eating one more hot dog in the fastest time.

After the winner is declared, a plate showing the number of hot dogs eaten by the winner is brought out for photo opportunities.

== Awards ==
The winner of the men's competition is of the coveted international "bejeweled" mustard-yellow belt. The belt is of "unknown age and value" according to IFOCE co-founder George Shea and rests in the country of its owner. In 2011, Sonya Thomas won the inaugural women's competition and its "bejeweled" pink belt.

Various other prizes have been awarded over the years. For example, in 2004 Orbitz donated a travel package to the winner. Starting in 2007, cash prizes have been awarded to the top finishers.

== History ==
The first official contest was on June 30, 1967, the winner was a “400-pound truck driver” named Walter Paul with approx. 127 hotdogs in one hour.The Nathan's Hot Dog Eating Contest has been held at the original location on Coney Island most years since about 1972, usually in conjunction with Independence Day. As Coney Island is often linked with recreational activities of the summer season, several early contests were held on other holidays associated with summer besides Independence Day; for example, multiple contests in the 1970s were scheduled on Memorial Day or Labor Day.

In the late 1990s and early 2000s, the competition was dominated by Japanese contestants, particularly Kobayashi, who won six consecutive contests from 2001 to 2006. In 2001, Kobayashi transformed the competition and the world of competitive eating by downing 50 hot dogs—smashing the previous record of 25.5. The Japanese eater introduced advanced eating and training techniques that shattered previous competitive eating world records. The rise in popularity of the event coincided with the surge in popularity of the worldwide competitive eating circuit.

Over the past 20 years, a considerable amount of pomp and circumstance have surrounded the days leading up to the event, which has become an annual spectacle of competitive entertainment. The event is presented on an extravagant stage complete with colorful live announcers and an overall party atmosphere. The day before the contest is a public weigh-in, often with the mayor of New York City. Some competitors don flamboyant costumes and/or makeup, while others may promote themselves with eating-related nicknames. On the morning of the event, they have a heralded arrival to Coney Island on the "bus of champions" and are called to the stage individually during introductions. In 2013, six-time defending champion Joey Chestnut was escorted to the stage in a sedan chair.

The competition draws many spectators and worldwide press coverage. In 2004, a three-story-high "Hot Dog Eating Wall of Fame" was erected at the site of the annual contest. The wall lists past winners, and has a digital clock which counts down the minutes until the next contest. In 2007, an estimated 50,000 came out to witness the event. Despite substantial damage suffered at Nathan's due to Hurricane Sandy in October 2012, the location was repaired, reopened, and the 2013 event was held as scheduled.

ESPN has long enjoyed solid ratings from its broadcast of the Hot Dog Eating Contest on Independence Day, and on July 1, 2014, the network announced it had extended its agreement with Major League Eating and would broadcast the contest through 2024. The most recent broadcast rights deal, announced in November 2022, will keep the contest airing on ESPN through 2029.

In 2003 former National Football League player William "The Refrigerator" Perry competed as a celebrity contestant. Though he had won a qualifier by eating twelve hot dogs, he ate only four at the contest, stopping after just five minutes. The celebrity contestant experiment has not been held since.

At the 2007 contest, the results were delayed to review whether defending champion Kobayashi had vomited (also known as a "Roman method incident" or "reversal of fortune") in the final seconds of regulation. Such an incident results in the disqualification of the competitor under the rules of the IFOCE. The judges ruled in Kobayashi's favor. A similar incident occurred involving Kobayashi in 2002 in a victory over Eric "Badlands" Booker.

In April 2011, Major League Eating announced they were splitting the annual contest into two separate contests, one each for men and women. On July 4, 2011, Sonya Thomas became the champion of the first Nathan's Hot Dog Eating Contest for Women. Previously, women and men had competed against each other, except for one Memorial Day competition held in 1975. Eating 40 hot dogs in 10 minutes, Thomas earned the inaugural Pepto-Bismol-sponsored pink belt and won $10,000.

In 2020, due to the COVID-19 pandemic, the contest was held without spectators at an indoor location in Williamsburg, Brooklyn, and only five eaters competed in each category instead of the usual 15. In 2021, the event was held at Maimonides Park, with a reduced crowd of about 7,000.

=== Competitor bans ===
Kobayashi has not competed in the contest since 2009 due to his refusal to sign an exclusive contract with Major League Eating, which is the current sanctioning body of the contest. In 2010, he was arrested by police after attempting to jump on the stage after the contest was over and disrupt the proceedings. Some witnesses reported that Kobayashi was attempting to congratulate the winner, Chestnut. On August 5, 2010, all charges against Kobayashi were dismissed by a judge in Brooklyn. Despite his six consecutive victories in their annual event, Nathan's removed Kobayashi's image from their "Wall of Fame" in 2011. Kobayashi again refused to compete in 2011, but instead conducted his own hot dog eating exhibition, consuming 69 HDB, seven more than Chestnut accomplished in the Nathan's contest. The sports website Deadspin deemed Kobayashi's solo appearance "an improbably perfect 'up yours' to the Nathan's hot dog eating contest."

Chestnut was banned from the 2024 contest due to signing a deal with Impossible Food, which sells plant based products including hot dogs. A Major League Eating executive claimed that Nathan's asked for an exemption to the deal be made regarding Impossible Food's hot dogs which was denied with Major League Eating banning Chestnut as a result. On June 25, Chestnut instead agreed to attend Fort Bliss' Pop Goes the Fort celebration and compete in a 4 versus 1 eating competition with a five minute time limit, with Chestnut prevailing 57 to 49 while raising $106,000 for Operation Homefront.

=== Fake history of the contest ===
In 2010, Nathan's promoter Mortimer "Morty" Matz admitted to having fabricated the legend of the 1916 start date with a man named Max Rosey in the early 1970s as part of a publicity stunt.

According to that legend, on July 4, 1916, four immigrants held a hot dog eating contest at Nathan's Famous stand on Coney Island to settle an argument about who was the most patriotic. Some accounts alleged that a man named Jim Mullen won the first contest. Others described Jimmy Durante, who was not an immigrant, as competing in that all-immigrant inaugural contest, which was judged by Eddie Cantor and Sophie Tucker. Another co-founder describes the event as beginning "in 1917, and pitted Mae West's father, Jack, against entertainer Eddie Cantor." Nathan made the spurious claim that the contest has been held each year since then except 1941, "as a protest to the war in Europe", and 1971, as a protest to political unrest in the U.S.

The legend grew over the years, to the point where The New York Times and other publications were known to have repeatedly listed 1916 as the inaugural year, although no evidence of the contest exists.

== Results ==
=== By year (color-coded by belt color) ===
Year	Winner (and date, if prior to permanently moving all contests to Independence Day in 1997)	Hot dogs and buns (HDB)	Contest duration	Note(s)
2026	MEN'S (United States) Joey Chestnut	66	10 min	The two all-time greatest eaters left no doubt as Joey Chestnut and Miki Sudo won their 18th mustard yellow and 12th pink championship belts, respectively. Larell Marie Mele tied Sonya Thomas as the most tenured female eater in Nathan’s history with her 16th Nathan’s competition, while Chestnut tied Eric “Badlands” Booker for the men’s all-time lead with his 21st appearance. Patrick Bertoletti became just the second male and third eater ever to eclipse the 500 HDB plateau.
2026	WOMEN'S (United States) Miki Sudo	38 3/4	10 min	The two all-time greatest eaters left no doubt as Joey Chestnut and Miki Sudo won their 18th mustard yellow and 12th pink championship belts, respectively. Larell Marie Mele tied Sonya Thomas as the most tenured female eater in Nathan’s history with her 16th Nathan’s competition, while Chestnut tied Eric “Badlands” Booker for the men’s all-time lead with his 21st appearance. Patrick Bertoletti became just the second male and third eater ever to eclipse the 500 HDB plateau.
2025	MEN'S (United States) Joey Chestnut	70 1/2	10 min	Joey Chestnut returned after missing the 2024 contest and captured his 17th mustard yellow belt. Chestnut downed 70.5 HDB, reaching the 70+ HDB plateau for the seventh time, and trounced the field winning by 24 HDB over his closest competitor. Miki Sudo remained undefeated in Nathan’s competition and captured her 11th Nathan’s Hot Dog victory in as many tries.
2025	WOMEN'S (United States) Miki Sudo	33	10 min	Joey Chestnut returned after missing the 2024 contest and captured his 17th mustard yellow belt. Chestnut downed 70.5 HDB, reaching the 70+ HDB plateau for the seventh time, and trounced the field winning by 24 HDB over his closest competitor. Miki Sudo remained undefeated in Nathan’s competition and captured her 11th Nathan’s Hot Dog victory in as many tries.
2024	MEN'S (United States) Patrick Bertoletti	58	10 min	Joey Chestnut is absent from the men’s event for the first time since 2004, due to a purported sponsorship issue between Chestnut and Major League Eating. Chestnut eats 57 HDB in 5 minutes in a non-sponsored event. Miki Sudo sets a new women’s record, with 51 HDB eaten.
2024	WOMEN'S (United States) Miki Sudo	51	10 min	Joey Chestnut is absent from the men’s event for the first time since 2004, due to a purported sponsorship issue between Chestnut and Major League Eating. Chestnut eats 57 HDB in 5 minutes in a non-sponsored event. Miki Sudo sets a new women’s record, with 51 HDB eaten.
2023	MEN'S (United States) Joey Chestnut	62	10 min	For the first time in Nathan’s history, the competitions were delayed by weather as lightning and severe storms rolled through the Coney Island area. The contests then took place several hours after the originally scheduled. Joey Chestnut extended his record for contests won to 16. He also matched his own record of eight consecutive contests won. Chestnut surpassed the 60 HDB mark for the 15th time in his career with 62. Miki Sudo remained undefeated in her Nathan’s career with her ninth title overall and became the third female to surpass the 300 HDB mark in their career. Newcomer Mayoi Ebihara became just the fifth woman in history to reach the 30 HDB mark, finishing second to Sudo with 33.5. Michelle Lesco joined Sudo in surpassing the 300 HDB career mark, becoming the fourth women to do so.
2023	WOMEN'S (United States) Miki Sudo	39 1/2	10 min	
2022	MEN'S (United States) Joey Chestnut	63	10 min	Miki Sudo returns from her pregnancy to reclaim her title. After being shoved from the table, Joey Chestnut puts a protester who ran onto the stage during the event in a chokehold. Geoffrey Esper (47 HDB) finished second. James Webb (41 HDB) finished third.
2022	WOMEN'S (United States) Miki Sudo	40	10 min	Miki Sudo returns from her pregnancy to reclaim her title. After being shoved from the table, Joey Chestnut puts a protester who ran onto the stage during the event in a chokehold. Geoffrey Esper (47 HDB) finished second. James Webb (41 HDB) finished third.
2021	MEN'S (United States) Joey Chestnut	76	10 min	The event is held at Maimonides Park due to capacity restrictions and other health and safety requirements. Joey Chestnut breaks the world record with 76 HDB. Defending champion Miki Sudo was out due to her pregnancy.
2021	WOMEN'S (United States) Michelle Lesco	30 3/4	10 min	The event is held at Maimonides Park due to capacity restrictions and other health and safety requirements. Joey Chestnut breaks the world record with 76 HDB. Defending champion Miki Sudo was out due to her pregnancy.
2020	MEN'S (United States) Joey Chestnut	75	10 min	First time event is being held indoors without fans caused by the COVID-19 pandemic. Joey Chestnut breaks the world record with 75 HDB. Darron Breeden (42 HDB) finished second. Nick Wehry (39.5 HDB) finished third. Miki Sudo breaks the women's world record with 48.5 HDB.
2020	WOMEN'S (United States) Miki Sudo	48 1/2	10 min	First time event is being held indoors without fans caused by the COVID-19 pandemic. Joey Chestnut breaks the world record with 75 HDB. Darron Breeden (42 HDB) finished second. Nick Wehry (39.5 HDB) finished third. Miki Sudo breaks the women's world record with 48.5 HDB.
2019	MEN'S (United States) Joey Chestnut	71	10 min	Joey Chestnut won his 12th title. Darron Breeden (50 HDB) finished second. Geoffrey Esper (47 HDB) finished third. Sudo (31 HDB) edged out Lesco (26 HDB) to win her sixth Nathan's belt.
2019	WOMEN'S (United States) Miki Sudo	31	10 min	Joey Chestnut won his 12th title. Darron Breeden (50 HDB) finished second. Geoffrey Esper (47 HDB) finished third. Sudo (31 HDB) edged out Lesco (26 HDB) to win her sixth Nathan's belt.
2018	MEN'S (United States) Joey Chestnut	74	10 min	After a judging error had left the results in question, the final results showed that Joey Chestnut broke the world record with 74 HDB. Carmen Cincotti (64 HDB) finished second. Darron Breeden (43 HDB) finished third. Sudo won her fifth women's belt. Michelle Lesco (28 HDB) finished second. Sonya Thomas and Juliet Lee (25 HDB) tied for third. This is the last competition that Thomas competed in.
2018	WOMEN'S (United States) Miki Sudo	37	10 min	After a judging error had left the results in question, the final results showed that Joey Chestnut broke the world record with 74 HDB. Carmen Cincotti (64 HDB) finished second. Darron Breeden (43 HDB) finished third. Sudo won her fifth women's belt. Michelle Lesco (28 HDB) finished second. Sonya Thomas and Juliet Lee (25 HDB) tied for third. This is the last competition that Thomas competed in.
2017	MEN'S (United States) Joey Chestnut	72	10 min	Joey Chestnut breaks the contest record with 72 HDB. Carmen Cincotti (60 HDB) finished second. Matt Stonie (48 HDB) finished third. Sudo won her fourth women's title, beating Michelle Lesco (32 HDB) and Thomas (30 HDB).
2017	WOMEN'S (United States) Miki Sudo	41	10 min	Joey Chestnut breaks the contest record with 72 HDB. Carmen Cincotti (60 HDB) finished second. Matt Stonie (48 HDB) finished third. Sudo won her fourth women's title, beating Michelle Lesco (32 HDB) and Thomas (30 HDB).
2016	MEN'S (United States) Joey Chestnut	70	10 min	Joey Chestnut won the mustard-colored belt for the ninth time, eating a record-breaking 70 hot dogs and buns. Defending champion Matt Stonie consumed 53 HDB. Sudo (38 1/2) won her third consecutive women's title, edging out Thomas (35 HDB). At the Giant National Capital BBQ Battle in Washington, D.C., on June 25, Chestnut set the record of 73.5 in an official qualifier.
2016	WOMEN'S (United States) Miki Sudo	38 1/2	10 min	Joey Chestnut won the mustard-colored belt for the ninth time, eating a record-breaking 70 hot dogs and buns. Defending champion Matt Stonie consumed 53 HDB. Sudo (38 1/2) won her third consecutive women's title, edging out Thomas (35 HDB). At the Giant National Capital BBQ Battle in Washington, D.C., on June 25, Chestnut set the record of 73.5 in an official qualifier.
2015	MEN'S (United States) Matt Stonie	62	10 min	Matt Stonie ended the 8 year winning streak of Joey Chestnut, eating 62 HDB to Joey's 60. Tim Janus (35 HDB) finished third. Sudo won her second women's belt, beating Thomas (31 HDB).
2015	WOMEN'S (United States) Miki Sudo	38	10 min	Matt Stonie ended the 8 year winning streak of Joey Chestnut, eating 62 HDB to Joey's 60. Tim Janus (35 HDB) finished third. Sudo won her second women's belt, beating Thomas (31 HDB).
2014	MEN'S (United States) Joey Chestnut	61	10 min	Joey Chestnut faced fierce competition from Matt Stonie, who finished second with 56 HDB. Tim Janus (44 HDB) finished in 3rd. This became Joey's 8th consecutive win. Miki Sudo (34 HDB) dethroned Thomas (27 3/4 HDB), the first time in the history of the competition that Thomas had been defeated since the inception of the women's division. Sudo also ended a long tradition by becoming the first champion in a quarter-century to decline to use a nickname during Nathan's competitions.
2014	WOMEN'S (United States) Miki Sudo	34	10 min	Joey Chestnut faced fierce competition from Matt Stonie, who finished second with 56 HDB. Tim Janus (44 HDB) finished in 3rd. This became Joey's 8th consecutive win. Miki Sudo (34 HDB) dethroned Thomas (27 3/4 HDB), the first time in the history of the competition that Thomas had been defeated since the inception of the women's division. Sudo also ended a long tradition by becoming the first champion in a quarter-century to decline to use a nickname during Nathan's competitions.
2013	MEN'S (United States) Joey Chestnut	69	10 min	Joey Chestnut beat his own record with 69 HDB. Matt Stonie (51HDB) finished second. Tim Janus (50 HDB) finished in 3rd. After facing fierce competition from Juliet Lee (36 HDB), Thomas (36 3/4 HDB) won her third title.
2013	WOMEN'S (United States) Sonya Thomas	36 3/4	10 min	Joey Chestnut beat his own record with 69 HDB. Matt Stonie (51HDB) finished second. Tim Janus (50 HDB) finished in 3rd. After facing fierce competition from Juliet Lee (36 HDB), Thomas (36 3/4 HDB) won her third title.
2012	MEN'S (United States) Joey Chestnut	68	10 min	Chestnut tied his previous record, previously set in 2009. He also became the second person to win six consecutive titles. Tim Janus (52.25) and Patrick Bertoletti (51) finish second and third. Matt Stonie, who would go on to claim victory in 2015 finished fourth with 46 HDB. Bob Shoudt was 5th (45 HDB) broke Thomas' record for oldest person to eat their age in HDB (45 yr) Thomas (45 HDB) broke the female record and set a new record for the oldest person to eat their age in HDB (44 yr), beating Juliet Lee (33 HDB).
2012	WOMEN'S (United States) Sonya Thomas	45	10 min	
2011	MEN'S (United States) Joey Chestnut	62	10 min	Separate competitions are held for women and men for the first time since the 1975 one-off event. Chestnut dominates on his way to his fifth straight title. Sonya Thomas (40 HDB) won the inaugural women's event. Patrick Bertoletti (53) and Tim "Eater X" Janus (45) finish 2nd and 3rd for the second year in a row.
2011	WOMEN'S (United States) Sonya Thomas	40	10 min	Separate competitions are held for women and men for the first time since the 1975 one-off event. Chestnut dominates on his way to his fifth straight title. Sonya Thomas (40 HDB) won the inaugural women's event. Patrick Bertoletti (53) and Tim "Eater X" Janus (45) finish 2nd and 3rd for the second year in a row.
2010	(United States) Joey Chestnut	54	10 min	Chestnut (54), Tim "Eater X" Janus (45), and Patrick Bertoletti (37) round out the top three.
2009	(United States) Joey Chestnut	68	10 min	Chestnut (68 HDB) beat his previous record in 10 minutes, setting new event, U.S., and world records. Kobayashi (64 1/2 HDB) set a Japanese record. Patrick Bertoletti (55 HDB) finished third. Sonya Thomas (41 HDB) broke the female record.
2008	(United States) Joey Chestnut	59 Eat-off: 5	10 min Eat-off: untimed, but completed in 50 sec.	Event, Japanese, U.S., and world records set (59 HDB). First event using the new ten-minute time limit, and first tie and eat-off since 1980. Chestnut & Kobayashi tied for first with 59 in regulation. In overtime Chestnut is the first to finish a plate of 5 HDB in 50 seconds. Kobayashi, losing by 7 seconds, finishes second. Tim Janus finished third with 42.
2007	(United States) Joey Chestnut	66	12 min	Having broken the world and U.S. records with 59 1/2 HDB at a qualifier contest on June 2, 2007, Chestnut (66 HDB) finishes first, setting new event, U.S. and world records. Defeating Kobayashi (63 HDB) for the first time. Fifth place Sonya Thomas (39 HDB) sets female record.
2006	(Japan) Takeru Kobayashi	53 3/4	12 min	Winner Kobayashi sets event, Japanese and world records. Second place Joey Chestnut (52 HDB), sets U.S. record. Sonya Thomas (37) finishes third.
2005	(Japan) Takeru Kobayashi	49	12 min	2nd: Sonya Thomas (37) sets U.S. record, Women's record. Future winner Joey Chestnut finishes third with 32.
2004	(Japan) Takeru Kobayashi	53 1/2	12 min	Event, United States and world records set. 2nd: Nobuyuki Shirota (38), Sonya Thomas (32 HDB) sets the female and U.S. records.
2003	(Japan) Takeru Kobayashi	44 1/2	12 min	Sonya Thomas (25 HDB) sets the female record. 2nd: Ed Jarvis (30 1/2, American record), 3rd: Eric Booker (29). Twenty competitors and 3,000 spectators in attendance. William "The Refrigerator" Perry competes, but eats only four HDB and drops out after five minutes.
2002	(Japan) Takeru Kobayashi	50 1/2	12 min	Event, Japanese and world records set.
2001	(Japan) Takeru Kobayashi	50	12 min	20 competitors total. All-time world records set. 2nd: Kazutoyo Arai (31), 3rd: Eric "Badlands" Booker (22).
2000	(Japan) Kazutoyo Arai	25 1/8	12 min	The contest was won by a 100-pound 32-year-old mattress salesman from Saitama, Japan. The prizes were "the coveted mustard-yellow International Belt, a huge red trophy, and 20 pounds of Nathan's hot dogs." Misao Fujita (also known as "Wild Beast") of Japan was the runner-up and consumed 24 hot dogs. A woman, Takako Akasaka of Japan, was the third-place finisher and consumed 22 hot dogs. 41 year old locomotive machinist Steve Addicks of Finksburg, Maryland, was the fourth-place finisher and consumed 21 hot dogs. 391-pound, 35 year old reigning champion Steve Keiner of Atlantic City, New Jersey "finished in the middle of the pack" and consumed 15 hot dogs. "Dozens" of contestants participated. A press account from the time describes this as an annual contest held regularly since 1916. Another describes this as the 85th annual contest.
1999	(United States) Steve Keiner	21 1/2	12 min	The contest was won by a 317-pound, 50-year-old man from Egg Harbor Township, New Jersey. The prize was the bejeweled mustard-colored belt and 60 pounds of hot dogs. Footage recorded by NY1 appeared to show that he actually consumed half of a hot dog before the starting gun was fired and should have been disqualified by the judges. Charles Hardy and Bartoszek Tadeusz, both of Brooklyn, were the runners-up and consumed 20 hot dogs each. Hardy charged that he could have consumed more had he been given another plate of hot dogs before time expired. 134-pound, reigning champion Hirofumi Nakajima of Japan consumed 19 hot dogs. Former champion Mike DeVito also participated.
1998	(Japan) Hirofumi Nakajima	19	12 min	The contest was won by the reigning champion, a 135-pound, 23 year old furniture delivery worker from Kōfu, Japan. The prizes were "the coveted mustard-yellow International Belt, a huge red trophy, and 20 pounds of Nathan's hot dogs." A 387-pound, 29 year old corrections officer from Brooklyn, Charles "Hungry" Hardy, was the runner-up and consumed 17 1/2 hot dogs. 381-pound, 35 year old mechanical engineer and former champion Ed Krachie came out of retirement in a vain attempt to break Japan's win streak but was the fourth-place finisher and consumed 14 hot dogs. A 53 year old haggis-eating champion from the United Kingdom, Barry Noble, also participated. In all, 16 contestants participated.
1997	(Japan) Hirofumi Nakajima	24 1/2	12 min	Although Nathan's attempted to expand its pool of American contestants by sponsoring "a circuit of qualifying contests leading up to the grand finale on the Fourth", Japanese contestants continued to increase their influence. The contest was won by the reigning champion, a 135-pound, 22 year old furniture delivery worker from Kōfu, Japan. The prizes were "a large emerald and brass trophy, a Mustard-Yellow International Belt, and a 20-pack take-out order for Nathan's hot dogs." 100-pound, 30 year old future champion Kazutoyo Arai of Saitama, Japan was the runner-up and consumed 24 hot dogs. 330-pound, 34 year old former champion Ed Krachie was the third-place finisher and consumed 20 hot dogs. 23 contestants participated. A press account from the time describes this as an annual contest held regularly since 1916.
1996	ONE-ON-ONE CHALLENGE WITH JAPAN (Japan) Hirofumi Nakajima; December 4	23 1/4	12 min	The contest was won by the reigning champion, a 300-pound man from Queens. The prizes apparently included the bejeweled mustard-yellow belt and a trophy, if not more. Former champion Mike DeVito was the runner-up and consumed 20 hot dogs. 200-pound, 42 year old Guardian Angels founder Curtis Sliwa was also a contestant. 20 contestants participated. A press account from the time describes this as an annual contest held regularly since 1916, except for 1939, 1940, and 1941—this time held under the moniker "Battle of the Burroughs". A later 1996 contest was also sponsored by Nathan's (and TV Tokyo), but was held at Central Park instead of at its traditional location. It was won by a 144-pound, 22-year-old man from Japan; he had never eaten a hot dog until the day before the competition. The prizes were the bejeweled mustard-yellow belt and $2,000. 320-pound, 33 year old mechanical engineer Ed Krachie of New York was the runner-up. Only those 2 contestants participated.
1996	(United States) Ed Krachie; Independence Day	22	12 min	
1995	(United States) Ed Krachie; Independence Day	19 1/2	12 min	The contest was won by a 350-pound NYNEX engineer from Queens. 205-pound, 33 year old Salomon Brothers vice president and reigning champion Mike DeVito of Manalapan Township, New Jersey, was the runner-up and consumed 19 hot dogs.
1994	(United States) Mike DeVito; Independence Day	20	12 min	The contest was won by the reigning champion, a 32 year old accountant. Future champion Ed Krachie was the runner-up. 40 year old Guardian Angels founder Curtis Sliwa was the third-place finisher and consumed 13 hot dogs.
1993	ONE-ON-ONE CHALLENGE WITH JAPAN (United States) Mike DeVito; October 27	18	30 min	The contest was won by a former champion, a Wall Street brokerage firm worker from Manalapan Township, New Jersey. The prize was 365 hot dogs. Joe Gotay of Brooklyn was the runner-up and consumed 14 1/2 hot dogs. Willie Dykstra of Brooklyn was the top female contestant and consumed 7 1/2 hot dogs. 18 men and 2 women participated. The reigning champion, 290-pound Frankie Dellarosa of Brooklyn, "canceled out at the last minute due to a family emergency" and was unable to defend his title. Instead, he declared that he was now retired from competitions and planned to pursue an acting career, something that he would later have a modest success in. A press account from the time describes this as the 77th annual contest, held regularly since 1916. A later 1993 contest was also sponsored by Nathan's (and recorded by TV Tokyo), but was held under the Brooklyn Bridge in Manhattan instead of at its traditional location. It was won by reigning champion DeVito. Years later it was stated that the prize was the bejeweled mustard-colored belt "created by the descendants of Fabergé" that remains in use today but had supposedly been held in Japan for some years after having been won by a Japanese contestant at Nathan's (presumably at the February 11, 1986, competition). The earliest that the belt's existence is known to be covered by the press is 1996. A woman, Orio Ito of Japan, was the runner-up and consumed 16 hot dogs. Only those 2 contestants participated.
1993	(United States) Mike DeVito; Independence Day	17	12 min	
1992	(United States) Frankie Dellarosa; Independence Day	19	12 min	The contest was won by the reigning champion. The prize was 365 hot dogs. Former and future champion Mike DeVito was the runner-up and consumed 17 hot dogs. 18 contestants participated. A press account from the time describes this as the 76th annual contest.
1991	(United States) Frankie Dellarosa; Independence Day	21	12 min	The contest was won by a 270-pound, 23 year old engineer and part-time Hofstra University football coach from Queens. The prize was "a 3-foot trophy, topped with an athlete, plate, and hot dog. He also received hats, cups, and a year's supply of hot dogs." 20 contestants participated. A press account from the time describes this as the 75th annual contest, this time held under the motto "No Guts, No Glory".
1990	(United States) Mike DeVito (United States) Jay Green; Independence Day	15	12 min	The contest was tied by the reigning champion, from Brooklyn, (Green) who was allowed to compete again despite previous contest rules, and a 28 year old from Staten Island (DeVito). There was apparently no tie-breaking eat-off. A press account from the time describes this as the 7th annual contest.
1989	(United States) Jay Green; Independence Day	15 1/2	12 min	The contest was won by the reigning champion, a 215-pound, 31 year old dry wall contractor, who, as per contest rules, was declared "retired" after the competition for being a two-time winner. 24 contestants participated. A press account from the time describes this as the 73rd annual contest.
1988	(United States) Jay Green; Independence Day	10	12 min	The contest was won by a 30 year old limousine service manager from Sheepshead Bay, Brooklyn. 13 contestants participated. A press account from the time describes this as the 72nd annual contest.
1987	(United States) Don Wolfman; Independence Day	13 1/2	10 min	29 year old future champion Jay Green was the runner-up and consumed 13 1/4 hot dogs. A press account from the time describes this as the 71st annual contest.
1986	(United States) Mark Heller; Independence Day	15 1/2	10 min	The contest was won by a 245-pound man; the prizes were a plaque and a year supply of hot dogs. Robert Gerber was the runner-up and consumed 13 hot dogs. 24 men participated. A press account from the time describes this as the 70th annual contest, held regularly since 1916. An earlier 1986 contest was also sponsored by Nathan's. It was won by a 264-pound, 21-year-old student from Tokyo, Japan. Reigning champion Oscar Rodriguez was the runner-up and consumed 9 1/2 hot dogs. Only those 2 contestants participated.
1986	ONE-ON-ONE CHALLENGE WITH JAPAN (Japan) Hiroaki Tominaga; February 11	10 1/2	10 min	
1985	(United States) Oscar Rodriguez; Independence Day	11 3/4	12 min	The contest was won by a 21-year-old man. More than 40 contestants participated.
1984	(Germany) Birgit Felden; Independence Day	9 1/2	10 min	The contest was won by a 130-pound, 17 year old West German women's judo team member from Cologne; she had never eaten a hot dog before the competition. Publicist Morty Matz described her as being only the second female to have ever won the contest. 17 year old U.S. women's judo team member Jean Kanokogi (and daughter of Ryohei and Rusty Kanokogi) of Sheepshead Bay, Brooklyn was the runner-up and consumed 8 hot dogs. 20 men and 4 women participated. A press account from the time describes this as the 68th annual contest.
1983	(United States) Emil Gomez; Independence Day	10 1/2	10 min	The contest was won by a 210-pound, 25 year old accountant from the Bronx. His brother, Andre Gomez, was the runner-up and consumed 10 hot dogs. 11 contestants participated. A press account from the time describes this as the 17th annual contest.
1982	(United States) Steven Abrams; Independence Day (observed July 5)	11+	10 min	The contest was held on Monday, July 5, the observed date of Independence Day, as the holiday fell on a Sunday. It was won by a 26 year old from Flushing, Queens. He ate one bite of a twelfth hot dog. Sid Smith of Brooklyn was the runner-up and consumed 10 hot dogs, and Risto Puulos of Helsinki was the third-place finisher and consumed 8.
1981	(United States) Thomas DeBerry; Independence Day	11	5 min	The contest was won by a 35 year old Housing Authority gardener from Coney Island, Brooklyn. He "downed 11 hot dogs in five minutes and then rushed off with his family to attend a barbecue."
1980	(United States) Joe Baldini (United States) Paul Siederman; Independence Day	9 3/4+ Eat-off: 3 1/2	10 min Eat-off: 3 min	The contest was tied by a 190-pound, 25 year old unemployed pharmacist (Baldini) and a 260-pound, 21 year old unemployed actor (Siederman), both from Brooklyn. Each then tied again after a tie-breaking eat-off. The prizes were "two trophies and a pair of yellow plastic bags". Reigning co-champion Jim Mattner was the third-place finisher and consumed approximately 9 hot dogs. 28 contestants participated. A press account from the time describes this as the 64th annual contest.
1979	(United States) Luther Frazier (United States) Jim Mattner; Independence Day	10 Eat-off: 3 1/2	10 min Eat-off: 3 1/2 min	The contest was tied by a 172-pound 17-year-old boy from Brooklyn (Frazier) and a 205-pound, 35 year old bond dealer from Ozone Park, Queens (Mattner). Each then tied again after a tie-breaking eat-off. They consumed what was considered a "record" number of hot dogs, when including the eat-off total. A press account from the time describes this as the 63rd annual contest.
1978	(United States) Manel Hollenback (United States) Kevin Sinclair; Memorial Day	10	6 1/2 min	The contest was held on Memorial Day and was tied by a 180-pound, 18 year old basketball player from Newark, New Jersey (Hollenback) and a 75-pound, 10-year-old student (Sinclair). There was apparently no tie-breaking eat-off. 28 contestants participated. A press account from the time describes this as an annual contest held regularly since 1917, except for 1942 and 1944.
1976–1977	(no documented contests)			
1975	MEN'S (United States) Lonnie Brown; Memorial Day	8	3 1/2 min, with a 1 min break	An all-female contest was originally scheduled to be held on Memorial Day with the winner to be declared "Miss Coney Island;" the contest was won by a 30 year old market researcher from Manhattan. A contemporary press account indicates that when the contest was held it was ultimately decided to allow men to participate and that the top-finishing male was awarded a plaque; he was a 28 year old National Guardsman from Far Rockaway, Queens. 15 contestants participated.
1975	WOMEN'S (United States) Sharlene Smith; Memorial Day	8 1/2	3 1/2 min, with a 1 min break	An all-female contest was originally scheduled to be held on Memorial Day with the winner to be declared "Miss Coney Island;" the contest was won by a 30 year old market researcher from Manhattan. A contemporary press account indicates that when the contest was held it was ultimately decided to allow men to participate and that the top-finishing male was awarded a plaque; he was a 28 year old National Guardsman from Far Rockaway, Queens. 15 contestants participated.
1974	(United States) Walter Paul (United States) Paul Sirop; Labor Day	(unknown)	(unknown)	The first 1974 contest was held on April 7 (opening day for Coney Island's summer season activities) and was won by a 22 year old Manhattan Community College student from Astoria, Queens; the prize was a trophy. Six contestants participated. The second 1974 contest was held on Independence Day and was won by a 185-pound, 24 year old from Brooklyn; the prize was "a trophy with an emblazoned hot dog on it". The third 1974 contest was held on Labor Day and was tied by Walter Paul—the event's first two-time winner—and Paul Sirop. There was apparently no tie-breaking eat-off.
1974	(United States) Roberto Muriel; Independence Day	10	3 1/2 min	
1974	(United States) John Connolly; Opening day of Coney Island's summer season (April 7)	9	2 1/2 min	
1973	(unknown); Independence Day	(unknown)	(unknown)	The first 1973 contest was scheduled to be held on April 7 (opening day for Coney Island's summer season activities) but was canceled due to the 1973 meat boycott. A press account from the time describes this to have been the 23rd annual contest. A contest was scheduled to be held on Independence Day (designated as the 106th anniversary of the invention of the hot dog) and refereed by the "1973 Hot Dog Queen", but no results are known to have been compiled and released to the public.
1973	(canceled); Opening day of Coney Island's summer season (April 7)	—	—	The first 1973 contest was scheduled to be held on April 7 (opening day for Coney Island's summer season activities) but was canceled due to the 1973 meat boycott. A press account from the time describes this to have been the 23rd annual contest. A contest was scheduled to be held on Independence Day (designated as the 106th anniversary of the invention of the hot dog) and refereed by the "1973 Hot Dog Queen", but no results are known to have been compiled and released to the public.
1972	(United States) Melody Andorfer; Labor Day	12	5 min	The first 1972 contest was held on Memorial Day and was won by a Brooklyn College student; the prize "was a book of certificates for forty more hot dogs". The second 1972 contest was held on Labor Day and was won by a 105-pound, 18-year-old female community activist from Astoria, Queens; the prize was a paper crown (on July 2, 2021, she received a belt similar to those awarded to recent winners, for her past achievement). 260-pound, 19 year old Gary Silverman of Brooklyn was the runner-up and consumed 10 hot dogs. 8 men and 8 women participated. A press account from the time describes this as the 23rd annual contest. In 2020, the Coney Island History Project interviewed Andorfer.
1972	(United States) Jason Schechter; Memorial Day	14	3 1/2 min	
1968–1971	(no documented contests)			
1967	(United States) Walter Paul; Centennial celebration of the invention of the hot dog (June 30)	17^{a}	60 min	The contest was held on June 30 (designated as the 100th anniversary of the invention of the hot dog) and was won by a 400-pound, 32 year old truck driver. The prize was "a trophy proclaiming him the world's champion hot dog eater." He consumed the hot dogs over the period of "one hour flat". It is not immediately clear if he ate buns with the hot dogs.

^a though Walter Paul's 1967 feat is documented in multiple UPI press accounts from the time, he has also been mentioned in passing in more recent press accounts for supposedly establishing the contest's then-record 17 hot dogs consumed; several other people have similarly been credited for records of 13 1/2, 17 1/2, or 18 1/2 hot dogs consumed; the following feats are not known to be documented more fully in press accounts from the time of their occurrence and, as such, may not be credible and are not included in the Results table above:

"Several years" before 1986: unspecified contestant, 13 1/2
1979: unspecified contestant, 17 1/2
1978: Walter Paul (described as being from Coney Island, Brooklyn), 17
1974: unspecified contestant, 16
1968: Walter Paul (described as "a rotund Coney Island carnival caretaker"), 17
1959: Peter Washburn (described as "a one-armed Brooklyn Carnival worker"), 18 1/2 or 17
1959: Paul Washburn (described as a carnival worker from Brooklyn), 17 1/2
1959: Walter Paul (described as a 260-pound man from Brooklyn), 17
1957: Paul Washburn, 17 1/2

=== By champion ===
No. of Titles	Name	Year(s)
18	(United States) Joey Chestnut	2007–2014, 2016–2023, 2025–2026
12	(United States) Miki Sudo	2014–2020, 2022–2026
6	(Japan) Takeru Kobayashi	2001–2006
4	(United States) Mike DeVito	1990,^{a} 1993 (Independence Day & October 27)–1994
3	(United States) Jay Green	1988–1990^{a}
3	(Japan) Hirofumi Nakajima	1996 (December 4)–1998
3	(United States) Sonya Thomas	2011–2013
2	(United States) Frankie Dellarosa	1991–1992
2	(United States) Ed Krachie	1995–1996
2	(United States) Walter Paul	1967 (Centennial celebration of the invention of the hot dog), 1974 (Labor Day)^{a}
1	(United States) Steven Abrams	1982
1	(United States) Melody Andorfer	1972 (Labor Day)
1	(Japan) Kazutoyo Arai	2000
1	(United States) Joe Baldini	1980^{a}
1	(United States) Patrick Bertoletti	2024
1	(United States) Lonnie Brown	1975 (Memorial Day)
1	(United States) John Connolly	1974 (Opening day of Coney Island's summer season)
1	(United States) Thomas DeBerry	1981
1	(Germany) Birgit Felden	1984
1	(United States) Luther Frazier	1979^{a}
1	(United States) Emil Gomez	1983
1	(United States) Mark Heller	1986
1	(United States) Manel Hollenback	1978^{a}
1	(United States) Steve Keiner	1999
1	(United States) Michelle Lesco	2021
1	(United States) Jim Mattner	1979^{a}
1	(United States) Roberto Muriel	1974
1	(United States) Oscar Rodriguez	1985
1	(United States) Jason Schechter	1972 (Memorial Day)
1	(United States) Paul Siederman	1980^{a}
1	(United States) Kevin Sinclair	1978^{a}
1	(United States) Paul Sirop	1974 (Labor Day)^{a}
1	(United States) Sharlene Smith	1975 (Memorial Day)
1	(United States) Matt Stonie	2015
1	(Japan) Hiroaki Tominaga	1986 (February 11)
1	(unknown)	1973
1	(United States) Don Wolfman	1987

^a the 1974 Labor Day and 1978, 1979, 1980, and 1990 Independence Day competitions ended in ties

=== By contest type ===
Joint male & female competitions (1967, 1972–1974, 1978–2010)
No. of Titles	Name	Year(s)
6	(Japan) Takeru Kobayashi	2001–2006
4	(United States) Joey Chestnut	2007–2010
3	(United States) Mike DeVito	1990,^{a} 1993–1994
3	(United States) Jay Green	1988–1990^{a}
2	(United States) Frankie Dellarosa	1991–1992
2	(United States) Ed Krachie	1995–1996
2	(Japan) Hirofumi Nakajima	1997–1998
2	(United States) Walter Paul	1967 (Centennial celebration of the invention of the hot dog), 1974 (Labor Day)^{a}
1	(United States) Steven Abrams	1982
1	(United States) Melody Andorfer	1972 (Labor Day)
1	(Japan) Kazutoyo Arai	2000
1	(United States) Joe Baldini	1980^{a}
1	(United States) John Connolly	1974 (Opening day of Coney Island's summer season)
1	(United States) Thomas DeBerry	1981
1	(Germany) Birgit Felden	1984
1	(United States) Luther Frazier	1979^{a}
1	(United States) Emil Gomez	1983
1	(United States) Mark Heller	1986
1	(United States) Manel Hollenback	1978^{a}
1	(United States) Steve Keiner	1999
1	(United States) Jim Mattner	1979^{a}
1	(United States) Roberto Muriel	1974
1	(United States) Oscar Rodriguez	1985
1	(United States) Jason Schechter	1972 (Memorial Day)
1	(United States) Paul Siederman	1980^{a}
1	(United States) Kevin Sinclair	1978^{a}
1	(United States) Paul Sirop	1974 (Labor Day)^{a}
1	(unknown)	1973
1	(United States) Don Wolfman	1987

^a the 1974 Labor Day and 1978, 1979, 1980, and 1990 Independence Day competitions ended in ties

Men's-only competitions (1975, 2011–Present)
No. of Titles	Name	Year(s)
11	(United States) Joey Chestnut	2011–2014, 2016–2023, 2025
1	(United States) Patrick Bertoletti	2024
1	(United States) Lonnie Brown	1975 (Memorial Day)
1	(United States) Matt Stonie	2015

Women's-only competitions (1975, 2011–Present)^{a}
No. of Titles	Name	Year(s)
8	(United States) Miki Sudo	2014–2020, 2022–2025
3	(United States) Sonya Thomas	2011–2013
1	(United States) Michelle Lesco	2021
1	(United States) Sharlene Smith	1975 (Memorial Day)

^a prior to restructuring the competition to offer women's-only contests, the media was known to use the term "women's category" to describe female participation; the top-finishers of the "women's category" in this era included, for 2003: Sonya Thomas (25), 2004: Sonya Thomas (32), 2005: Sonya Thomas (37), 2006: Sonya Thomas (37), 2007: Sonya Thomas (39), 2008: Sonya Thomas (34), 2009: Sonya Thomas (41), and 2010: Sonya Thomas (36)

One-on-One Challenges with Japan (1986, 1993, 1996)
No. of Titles	Name	Year
1	(United States) Mike DeVito	1993 (October 27)
1	(Japan) Hirofumi Nakajima	1996 (December 4)
1	(Japan) Hiroaki Tominaga	1986 (February 11)

== Media coverage ==
=== Live TV ===
In 2003, ESPN aired the contest for the first time on a tape-delayed basis. Starting in 2004, ESPN began airing the contest live. From 2005 to 2017, Paul Page was ESPN's play-by-play announcer for the event, accompanied by color commentator Richard Shea. In 2011, the women's competition was carried live on ESPN3, followed by the men's competition on ESPN. In 2012, ESPN signed an extension to carry the event through 2017. In 2014, ESPN signed an agreement to carry the competition on its networks for 10 years until 2024.

In 2021, Miki Sudo did not compete, as she was 37 weeks pregnant with her first child with fellow professional eater, Nick Wehry. Sudo instead served as an announcer, alongside Mike Golic Jr., Richard Shea, and Jason Fitz.

Television history
Year	Network	Announcers	Viewers
2003	ESPN		
2004	ESPN	Gary Miller, Richard Shea	926,000
2005	ESPN	Paul Page, Richard Shea	860,000
2006	ESPN	Paul Page, Richard Shea	1.46 million
2007	ESPN2	Paul Page, Richard Shea	1.632 million
2008	ESPN	Paul Page, Richard Shea	over 1 million
2009	ESPN	Paul Page, Richard Shea	1.34 million
2010	ESPN	Paul Page, Richard Shea, Todd Harris	1.677 million
2011	ESPN	Paul Page, Richard Shea, Renee Herlocker	1.949 million
2012	ESPN	Paul Page, Richard Shea, Renee Herlocker	1.299 million
2013	ESPN2	Paul Page, Richard Shea, Renee Herlocker	1.14 million
2014	ESPNEWS	Paul Page, Richard Shea, Cari Champion	402,000; 2.8 million (tape delay on ESPN)
2015	ESPN2	Paul Page, Richard Shea, Melanie Collins	1.129 million
2016	ESPN.com	Paul Page, Richard Shea, Melanie Collins	1.3 million (tape delay on ESPN)
2017	ESPN2	Paul Page, Richard Shea, Melanie Collins	1.11 million
2018	ESPN2	Adam Amin, Richard Shea, Melanie Collins	1.141 million
2019	ESPN2	Adam Amin, Richard Shea, Melanie Collins	1.36 million
2020	ESPN	Mike Golic Jr., Richard Shea, Jason Fitz	966,000
2021	ESPN	Mike Golic Jr., Richard Shea, Jason Fitz, Miki Sudo	1.35 million
2022	ESPNEWS	John Anderson, Richard Shea, Jason Fitz	1.033 million (tape delay on ESPN)
2023	ESPN2	John Anderson, Richard Shea, Renée James	1.008 million (weather delay to 2 pm ET)
2024	ESPN2	Jeremy Schaap, Richard Shea, Tiffany Greene	831,000
2025	ESPN2	Jeremy Schaap, Richard Shea, Tiffany Greene	1.6 million
2026	ABC, ESPN2	Jeremy Schaap, Richard Shea, Marion Crowder	5.02 million

=== Film and TV programs ===
The Nathan's contest has been featured in these documentaries and TV programs:

- "A Different Story" (July 4, 1996) – Jeannie Moos covers the contest on CNN
- "Red, White, and Yellow" (1998)
- "A Hot Dog Program: An All-American, Culinary Cruise Through Hot Dog History" (1999)
- "Gut Busters" (2002) Made for TV – Discovery Channel
- "Footlong" (2002) – not the 2003 short film of the same name
- "The Tsunami – Takeru Kobayashi" (2003) Japanese
- "Crazy Legs Conti: Zen and the Art of Competitive Eating" (2004)
- "The Most Extreme", "Big Mouths" episode (2004) (Animal Planet)
- Cheap Seats, (2004)
- "True Life" (2006) MTV documentary series
- Hungry (2013) documentary film; contract dispute between Nathan's Famous and Kobayashi
- "30 for 30: The Good, The Bad, The Hungry" (2019); ESPN Documentary

=== Newspapers ===
News sources typically use puns in head-lines and copy referring to the contest, such as "'Tsunami' is eating contest's top dog again", "couldn't cut the mustard" (A.P.), "Nathan's King ready, with relish" (Daily News) and "To be frank, Fridge faces a real hot-dog consumer" (ESPN).

Reporter Gersh Kuntzman of the New York Post has been covering the event since the early 1990s and has been a judge at the competition since 2000. Darren Rovell, of ESPN, has competed in a qualifier.

== Tactics and training ==
Each contestant has his or her own eating method. Takeru Kobayashi pioneered the "Solomon Method" at his first competition in 2001. The Solomon method consists of breaking each hot dog in half, eating the two halves at once, and then eating the bun.

"Dunking" is the most prominent method used today. Because buns absorb water, many contestants dunk the buns in water and squeeze them to make them easier to swallow, and slide down the throat more efficiently.

Other methods used include the "Carlene Pop", where the competitor jumps up and down while eating, to force the food down to the stomach. "Buns & Roses" is a similar trick, but the eater sways from side to side instead. "Juliet-ing" is a cheating method in which players simply throw the hot dog buns over their shoulders.

Contestants train and prepare for the event in different ways. Some fast; others prefer liquid-only diets before the event. Takeru Kobayashi meditates, drinks water and eats cabbage, then fasts before the event. Several contestants, such as Ed "Cookie" Jarvis, aim to be "hungry, but not too hungry" and have a light breakfast the morning of the event.

== See also ==
- Glutton Bowl
- Krystal Square Off
- Horsemen of the Esophagus
- Man v. Food
- Wing Bowl
- Eating contest
