= Takako Akasaka =

Japanese competitive eater

Takako Akasaka (Japanese: 赤阪尊子 Akasaka Takako born February 24, 1955) is a Japanese competitive eater from Osaka, Japan. She is considered the most successful female competitive eater in Japan.

Akasaka has earned multiple nicknames because of her efforts on the competitive eating circuit, including "Armageddon." She is also known as an excellent long-distance eater, specializing in sweet food, which earned her the nickname "The Sweet Queen" or "The Queen" among her admirers. She started competitive eating in 1989 and became famous when she won an annual TV Champion's eating contest in 1994. She won again in 1996 by beating Hirofumi Nakajima and Kazutoyo Arai, who were both soon to be Nathan's Hot Dog Eating Contest champions. One of her records is eating 90 ostrich egg omelettes in Australia. Takako Akasaka is the first person, male or female, to eat two #13 sandwiches (weighing 7 pounds total) at the Carnegie Deli in New York City.

In 2000, she, along with fellow Japanese eaters Arai and Misao Fujita, entered an annual Nathan's Hot Dog Eating Contest, where she became the first woman to do "The Deuce", eating more than 20 hot dogs with buns in 12 minutes. She finished at third place by eating 22 hot dogs, while Arai won the contest at 25, breaking the previous world record, and Fujita finished second at 24.

Her women's world record for hot dog eating was bested by Sonya Thomas, a Korean-born American. Ms. Akasaka remains one of three women to have eaten more than 20 hot dogs at Nathan's (Carlene LeFevre is the other).

Takako Akasaka has decreased the frequency of her contests and has worked as a commentator on Japanese competitive eating programs such as the "Gluttonous Queen" contest broadcast on TV Tokyo in the spring of 2006 on TV Tokyo.
