= Kevin Lipsitz =

American competitive eater

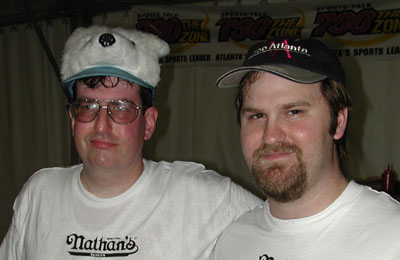
"Krazy" Kevin Lipsitz (left) and Mike "Top Dog" Leonard pose together after the two competed at a Nathan's Famous qualifier at Zoo Atlanta in 2002.

"Krazy" Kevin Lipsitz is a competitive eater from Staten Island, New York, and is affiliated with IFOCE, the International Federation of Competitive Eating. Known for his bear hat and charismatic eating style, Lipsitz has competed in events across the country, and appeared on the Gutbusters television special, which aired on the Discovery Channel in 2002. He is the former American pickle eating champion.

In 1997, Lipsitz was convicted on fraud charges in New York, stemming from his spamming of Usenet newsgroups with advertisements using AOL.com as a "Reply-to:" address. He resumed spamming in 1999.

In October 2021, Lipsitz pleaded guilty to mail fraud in connection with his sale of large quantities of personal protective equipment (PPE) at the beginning of the COVID-19 pandemic. Lipsitz was sentenced to 90 days in jail, three years post-release supervision, a $5,000 fine and $90,000 in restitution.
