= Steve Keiner =

American competitive eater

Steven "Steve" Keiner is an American competitive eater. He was the 1999 winner of the annual Nathan's Hot Dog Eating Contest in Coney Island, downing 20¼ hot dogs in 12 minutes. Keiner is from Egg Harbor Township, New Jersey and like many competitive eaters has used nicknames during contests; one of his nicknames, "Ralph," was given to him by newspaper reporter Gersh Kuntzman, because Kuntzman "gave the eaters nicknames that linked them to sporting heroes past". Keiner is also sometimes known on the competitive eating circuit as "The Terminator."
