= The Glutton Bowl =

Competitive eating television special

- Country of origin: United States

Original release
- Network: Fox
- Release: February 21, 2002

The Glutton Bowl (or The Glutton Bowl: The World's Greatest Eating Competition) is a two-hour competitive eating special that was broadcast Fox on February 21, 2002 and was sanctioned by the International Federation of Competitive Eating. The special, which was co-executive produced by Nash Entertainment and IFOCE co-founder Richard Shea, featured Mark Thompson and IFOCE co-founder George Shea as hosts/color commentators. The 32-eater tournament was won by Takeru Kobayashi of Japan. The event also included such noteworthy world record eaters as Eric "Badlands" Booker, Dominic "The Doginator" Cardo, Don "Moses" Lerman, Edward "Cookie" Jarvis, and Bill "El Wingador" Simmons.

== Contest set up ==
The competition was set up to have 3 rounds — the qualifiers, the wild card round, and the finals. In each round competitors were to eat the most of one specified food in a set amount of time. The winner of each qualifying competition was automatically in the finals. The runner up in each qualifier competed in the wild card round and the winner of that was the last person put in the final.

== Round-by-round ==
The list of foods eaten in each round and the winning amount eaten are as follows (each competition was 12 minutes long):

=== Qualifying rounds ===
- Hard-boiled eggs
  - the winner, Eric "Badlands" Booker (USA), ate 38 eggs
- Quarter-pound sticks of butter
  - the winner, Don "'Paula Deen' Moses" Lerman (USA), ate 10 sticks
- Whole beef tongue
  - 3 lb (1.4 kg) to each tongue
  - the winner, Dominic "The Doginator" Cardo (USA), ate 1 tongue plus a few bites of another
- Hot Dogs
  - the winner, Takeru Kobayashi (Japan), ate 31 hot dogs — bun and all
- Mayonnaise
  - 32 ounces (910 g) per bowl.
  - the winner, Oleg Zhornitskiy (Ukraine) ate 4 bowls which is equivalent to 8 pounds (3.6 kg) of mayo
- Hamburgers
  - 3 ounces (85 g) meat patties plus the bun (fast food type burgers)
  - the winner, Jed "The Jalapeno King" Donahue (USA), ate 11 hamburgers
- Sushi
  - 15-foot (4.6 m), 12-pound (5.4 kg). sushi roll, including two 1-foot-long (0.30 m) pieces of wasabi
  - the winner, Bill "El Wingador" Simmons (USA), consumed 3.8 feet (1.2 m)

=== Wild Card round ===
- Cooked (but not fried) Rocky Mountain Oysters
  - 3 lb (1.4 kg)

=== Finals ===
- Cow brain (1/3 pound (0.15 kg) each)
  - one plate and on to second (10 pounds (4.5 kg) per platter and 5 lb (2.3 kg) for additional platter)
  - won by Takeru Kobayashi (Japan)
