= Sonya Thomas =

Korean-American competitive eater (born 1967)

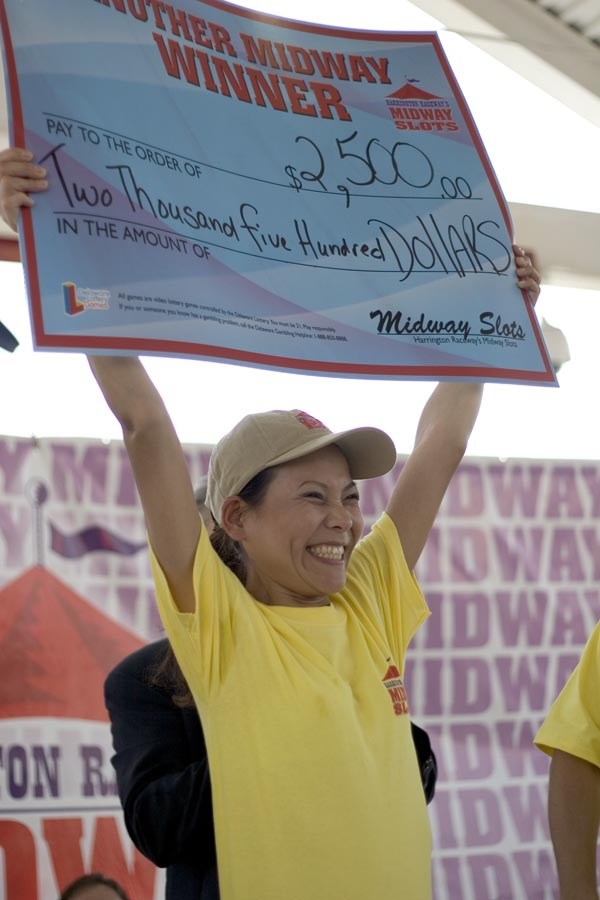
- Sonya Thomas at the 2005 Midway Slots Crabcake Eating Competition
- Born: July 26, 1967 (age 59); Kunsan, South Korea
- Occupation: Competitive eater

Korean name
- Hangul: 이선경
- RR: I Seongyeong
- MR: I Sŏn'gyŏng

Sonya Thomas (born Lee Sun-kyung on July 26, 1967), also known by her nickname The Black Widow, and "The Leader of the Four Horsemen of the Esophagus", is a South Korean-born American competitive eater from Alexandria, Virginia. Thomas joined the International Federation of Competitive Eating in 2003 and quickly rose to the top of the ranks, beating competitive eaters such as Eric Booker.

Her nickname "The Black Widow" refers to her ability to regularly defeat men four to five times her size. While the size of her stomach is only slightly larger than normal, her skinny build is perhaps her biggest advantage, allowing her stomach to expand more readily since it is not surrounded by the ring of fat common in other heavy eaters. She holds records in over 25 eating competitions, and in December 2008, she set the world record for fruit-cake eaten in 10 minutes.

On July 4, 2005, she ate 37 hot dogs in 12 minutes at Nathan's Hot Dog Eating Contest, setting a then-record for American competitors (which was also the female record). On August 8, 2005, she consumed 35 bratwursts in 10 minutes, beating the previous 10-minute record of 19.5 bratwursts, although her record was beaten in 2006 by Takeru Kobayashi.

On July 4, 2011, Thomas became the first champion of Nathan's Hot Dog Eating Contest for Women. Eating 40 hot dogs in 10 minutes, Thomas earned the inaugural pink Pepto Bismol Belt and won $10,000. She defended and held on to that title the following year eating 46 hot dogs. On July 4, 2013, she again defended her title by eating 36 3/4 hot dogs, just beating out Juliet Lee who ate 36 hot dogs.

== Competition ==
=== Champion ===
Thomas's first major victory that put her on the competitive eating map was in the 2004 Wing Bowl, where she became the first woman to win a Wing Bowl. Her tally of 32 hot dogs in the 2004 Nathan's Hot Dog contest was the most ever eaten by a male or female American competitor at the time. The only eaters besides Kobayashi to defeat Thomas between the 2004 and 2005 Nathan's contests were Bill "El Wingador" Simmons in the 2005 Wing Bowl, and Dale Boone, who cooled overheated baked beans in order to win an eating contest.

On July 4, 2011, Thomas became the first champion of Nathan's Hot Dog Eating Contest for Women, eating 40 hot dogs and buns in 10 minutes. She earned the inaugural Pink Belt and won $10,000. She repeated the feat with 45 hot dogs and buns in 2012. In the 2013 contest, Thomas captured a last-second victory by besting Juliet Lee with 36.75 hot dogs to Lee's 36. In 2014, she was defeated by rookie Miki Sudo with 27 3/4 hot dogs to Sudo's 34.

Thomas won first place in the National Buffalo Wing Festival US chicken wing eating championship five-years straight from 2007 to 2011. On September 4, 2011, she attained the United States Chicken Wing Eating Championship in Buffalo, New York, by eating 183 chicken wings in 12 minutes. On September 2, 2012 Joey Chestnut consumed 191 wings, weighing 7.61 pounds (3.45 kg) in 12 minutes to take competitive-eating trophy from the five-year champion Sonya Thomas.

=== Challenge and response ===
When Thomas undertook a challenging schedule of three contests in three cities on Labor Day weekend 2005, she had not lost a contest to anyone besides Kobayashi since the Wing Bowl in early February. Several last-minute victories foreshadowed that her streak would not last forever. At the Buffalo Wing Festival in Buffalo, NY, Ms. Thomas lost to Eric "Badlands" Booker in a chicken wing contest and then lost a waffle eating contest in Atlanta the next day to the fast-rising rookie Joey Chestnut, giving her a two event losing streak to replace her winning streak. Thomas' waffle defeat was avenged on Labor Day, however, when she out-ate Chestnut in the Chattanooga, TN Krystal Square Off qualifier. Thomas ate 57 Krystal Burgers to Chestnut's 56.

Before the GoldenPalace.com turkey eating contest in New York City Thanksgiving Eve, Thomas had gone three months without winning a non-qualifying contest, although she did have two impressive victories in qualifiers during that span. It appeared that Chestnut would soon claim the title of the leading American eater from Thomas. The civil engineering student from San Jose State had defeated Thomas in three of their last four match-ups and was the first eater to lead Kobayashi for the majority of a contest at the Krystal Square Off in Chattanooga the previous week. Although Thomas came in third, the silver lining was her domination of Kobayashi on a pound for pound basis: Thomas 56 burgers / 100 lb. = 0.56, Kobayashi 67 burgers / 170 lb. = 0.39.

At the turkey contest, Thomas was able to dramatically reverse her recent slump and defeat Chestnut without last second heroics, which she had not been able to do since Nathan's hot dog contest on July 4. Thomas' momentum continued the following week at a meatball contest in Atlantic City. Her total of 10 pounds 3 ounces (4.6 kg) beat Chestnut by two pounds (0.91 kg) and almost doubled her total from the previous year's meatball contest. Thomas' continued improvement, along with Chestnut's rapid ascent, gave Kobayashi more to worry about in 2006 than at any previous time in his dominant career.

On August 13, 2006, Thomas won her Asian debut competition in Hong Kong while setting her 28th eating record, by consuming 17 Chinese-style lotus seed buns in 12 minutes.

=== In the media ===
She was featured in a MasterCard Paypass commercial. By accident, she meets Takeru Kobayashi, a male competitor, in a convenience store. Their eyes flash, and they begin a hot dog eating duel, which they pay for using the Paypass card.

In 2005, Thomas earned more than $50,000 in prize money and made extensive media appearances.

== Training and competition notes ==
- She exercises by walking on an inclined treadmill for two hours, five times per week.
- She regularly visits all-you-can-eat buffets at restaurants.
- The night before a contest, she fasts all night in order to put an edge on her appetite.
- Thomas exercises up to two hours a day on an incline treadmill, and has maintained her weight since she started competing in 2003, down from 135 pounds (61 kg) when she worked as a typist in Korea. Her lowest weight has been 99 pounds (45 kg) at Wing Bowl XII in 2004.
- She only eats one very large meal a day, which takes several hours for her to complete. This meal includes green vegetables and fresh fruit. A typical post-work meal for her would be three large orders of fries, a chicken Whopper, 20 chicken tenders, and two 32 US fluid ounces (950 ml) diet soft drinks.
- She does not practice eating at speed for more than a two-minute period.
- Her favorite foods to eat at competitions are hard-boiled eggs, oysters and chicken wings.
- She claims to have had remaining stomach capacity after all her contests, except after eating the eight-pound (3.6 kg) Barrick burger, which took her 48 minutes to finish. She ate enough oysters to set the untimed record for oyster eating after the 2005 oyster competition was officially over.
- She had difficulty eating a hot dog in less than a minute when she first started training for her first contest, the 2003 Nathan's qualifier. After practicing, she was able to consume 18 hot dogs in 12 minutes.
- She out-ate Randy Thomas, a pro football player noted for his appetite, consuming 6.5 pounds (2.9 kg) of shrimp in 10 minutes to his 1.5 pounds (0.68 kg).

== Records ==
- Asparagus
  - 5.75 pounds (2.61 kg) of tempura deep fried asparagus spears in 10 minutes
- Cheesecakes
  - 11 pounds (5.0 kg) of Downtown Atlantic cheesecake in 9 minutes
- Chicken nuggets
  - 80 chicken nuggets in 5 minutes
- Chicken wings
  - 183 chicken wings in 12 minutes (2011 record)
- Chili
  - 1.125 US gallons (4.26 L) of Chili in 6 minutes
- Crabcakes
  - 46 3-ounce (85 g) ounce crabcakes in 10 minutes
- Eggs
  - 65 hard boiled eggs in 6 minutes and 40 seconds
- Fruitcakes
  - 4 pounds 14 1/4 ounces (2.22 kg) of Wegman's Fruitcake in 10 minutes
- Gyoza
  - 206 gyoza in 10 minutes
- Hamburgers
  - 7 burgers (3/4-pound (340 g) "Thickburgers") in 10 minutes
- Jambalaya
  - 9 pounds (4.1 kg) of crawfish jambalaya in 10 minutes
- Lobster
  - 44 lobsters totaling 11.3 pounds (5.1 kg) of lobster meat in 12 minutes
- MoonPies
  - 38 Moonpies in 8 minutes
- Oysters
  - 46 dozen Acme Oysters in 10 minutes(2005)
  - 29 dozen Acme Oysters in 8 minutes (2009)-Louisiana oyster season produced much larger oysters in 2009 explaining the slower pace -reclaimed the World Oyster Eating title
- Pizza
  - 6 extra large Bocce pizza slices in 15 minutes
- Pulled pork
  - 23 pulled pork sandwiches in 10 minutes
- Tacos
  - 43 soft tacos in 11 minutes
- Tater tots
  - 250 tater tots in 5 minutes
- Turducken
  - 7 3/4 pounds (3.5 kg) Turducken.com Thanksgiving Dinner in 12 minutes

== Nathan's Famous Hot Dog Eating Contest results ==
Year of Contest	Hot Dogs	Placing
2003 Qualifier	18	held at Molly Pitcher Rest Area, New Jersey
2003 Contest	25	5th place, & female record
2004 Qualifier	26.5	held at Philadelphia, Pennsylvania
2004 Contest	32	3rd place, female record, & U.S. record
2005 Qualifier	32	tied female & US record; held at Norfolk, Virginia
2005 Contest	37	2nd place, US record, & female record
2006 Contest	37	3rd place, tied female record
2007 Contest	39*	5th place, female record
2008 Contest	34	6th place
2009 Contest	41	6th place
2010 Contest	36	4th place
Women's Competition. Beginning in 2011, Nathan's Famous was split into Men's and Women's Competitions.
2011 Contest	40	1st place, contest & U.S. record
2012 Contest	45	1st place, contest & U.S. record
2013 Contest	36 3/4	1st place
2014 Contest	27 3/4	2nd place
2015 Contest	31	2nd place
2016 Contest	35	2nd place
2017 Contest	30	3rd place

== National Buffalo Wing Festival competition wins ==
Year of Contest	Buffalo wings	Time
2003	134	12 Minutes
2004	161	12 Minutes
2007	173	12 Minutes
2008	165	12 Minutes
2009	169	12 Minutes
2010	181	12 Minutes
2011	183	12 Minutes

== Post-competitive eating career ==
By 2023, she was described as "semi-retired", working as a manager at a Burger King in Maryland.

== See also ==
- List of competitive eaters
