= Nick Wehry =

American competitive eater (born 1989)

- Born: June 21, 1989 (age 37); Hartford, Connecticut
- Occupation: Competitive eater
- Spouse: Miki Sudo (m. 2021)
- Children: 3

Nick Wehry is an American competitive eater.

== Career ==
A former bodybuilder, Wehry was convinced by friends to join a paczkis eating contest in Connecticut for charity, which he won, marking the start of his competitive eating career. He is best known for eating 50 hard-boiled eggs in 3 minutes and 4 seconds in 2021.

In July 2024, he was accused of using sleight of hand to inflate his number of eaten hot dogs in the Nathan's Hot Dog Eating Contest. He was given an initial score of 46.75 hot dogs and ranked in fourth place, but his score was later adjusted to 51.75, which sparked accusations that he stole a competitor's empty plate to add onto his own stack of finished plates (each plate counts as 5 eaten hot dogs). Wehry denied the allegations. The adjustment did not affect his ranking, but helped him surpass the 50 hot dog mark, which is considered the threshold for separating elite competitors from everyday competitors.

In March 2026, he finished in third place at the Wings for Wishes Professional Wing Eating Championship, consuming 163 wings in 10 minutes.

In July 2026, he competed in the Nathan's Hot Dog Eating Contest. Similarly to the 2024 edition of the competition, his score was adjusted upwards by 5 after the initial count, moving him from sixth place (no prize) to fourth place ($1,500 prize). Fellow competitor Geoff Esper (who claimed he kept pace with Wehry during the competition but finished with 5 less) raised speculations that Wehry's score adjustment was the result of "double plating"; two plates stuck together that result in credit given for an extra plate when empty plates are counted at the end.

== Personal life ==
Wehry married fellow competitive eater Miki Sudo in 2021, whom he met in 2018. He has a daughter and a son from a previous marriage, as well as a son with Sudo.

== See also ==
- List of competitive eaters
