= Gutbusters (film) =

- Production company: Original Productions
- Release date: March 3, 2002
- Country: United States
- Language: English

Gutbusters is a 2002 Discovery Channel documentary following the efforts of three competitive eaters seeking to gain entry into the Nathan's Famous Fourth of July International Hot Dog Eating Contest.

== Background ==
The documentary follows three members of the competitive eating community. The program documents the training and one stop is at J&R’s Steakhouse in Long Island. The restaurant gives eaters one hour to eat a 76 ounce steak and one portion of a side order: the meal for free if they can accomplish the task. The show also follows eaters in other states who compete eating crawfish, hot dogs and pancakes.

The documentary also introduces International Federation of Competitive Eating founders Richard and George Shea and details their efforts to establish eating as a sport. A second installment of Gutbusters, about the IFOCE in Alaska, also ran on Discovery Channel. The show featured: “Hungry” Charles Hardy, Dale Boone and “Crazy Legs” Conti.

The documentary, produced by Original Productions, features Edward "Cookie" Jarvis, Don Lerman and Kevin Lipsitz

== See also ==
- List of competitive eaters
