= Jason Fagone =

American journalist and author

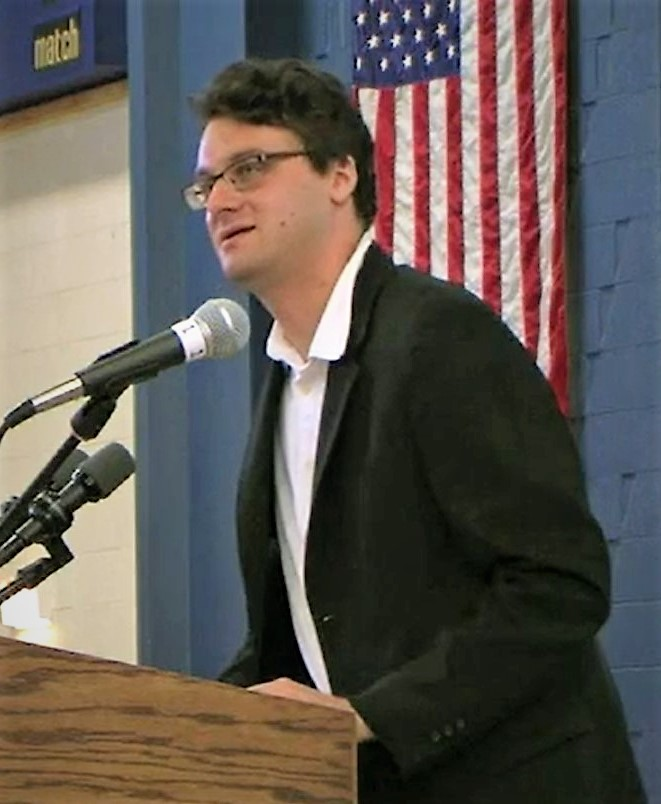
Fagone in 2011

Jason Fagone is an American journalist and author. His work has appeared in GQ, Wired, Esquire, The Atlantic, New York, Grantland, The New York Times, and the Huffington Post Highline, among other outlets. In 2002, the Columbia Journalism Review named him one of "Ten Young Writers on the Rise". He currently writes investigative stories for The San Francisco Chronicle.

== Career ==
His first book, Horsemen of the Esophagus, is about competitive eating. Of the sport-like activity, Fagone writes, "You hate to see all these very clear human desires poured into something like an eating contest. But it’s kind of inspiring that we’re creative enough and resilient enough to make it work. It’s both an American horror show and an American success story."

His second book, Ingenious: A True Story Of Invention, Automotive Daring, And The Race To Revive America is about teams in the Progressive Automotive X PRIZE, including Edison2 (Very Light Car) and Illuminati Motor Works Seven, and the competition to make a 100+ MPGe vehicle. It was released on November 5, 2013, by Crown Publishing. Kirkus Reviews called it "a well-tooled, instructive tale".

Fagone's most recent book, The Woman Who Smashed Codes, is about the expert cryptanalyst Elizebeth Smith Friedman.

In 2018, Fagone published an article for the Huffington Post that became the basis for the 2022 film Jerry & Marge Go Large.

== Personal life ==
Fagone lived with his wife and daughter near Philadelphia, Pennsylvania before relocating to San Francisco to work as a reporter at the San Francisco Chronicle.
