= Miki Sudo =

American competitive eater (born 1985)

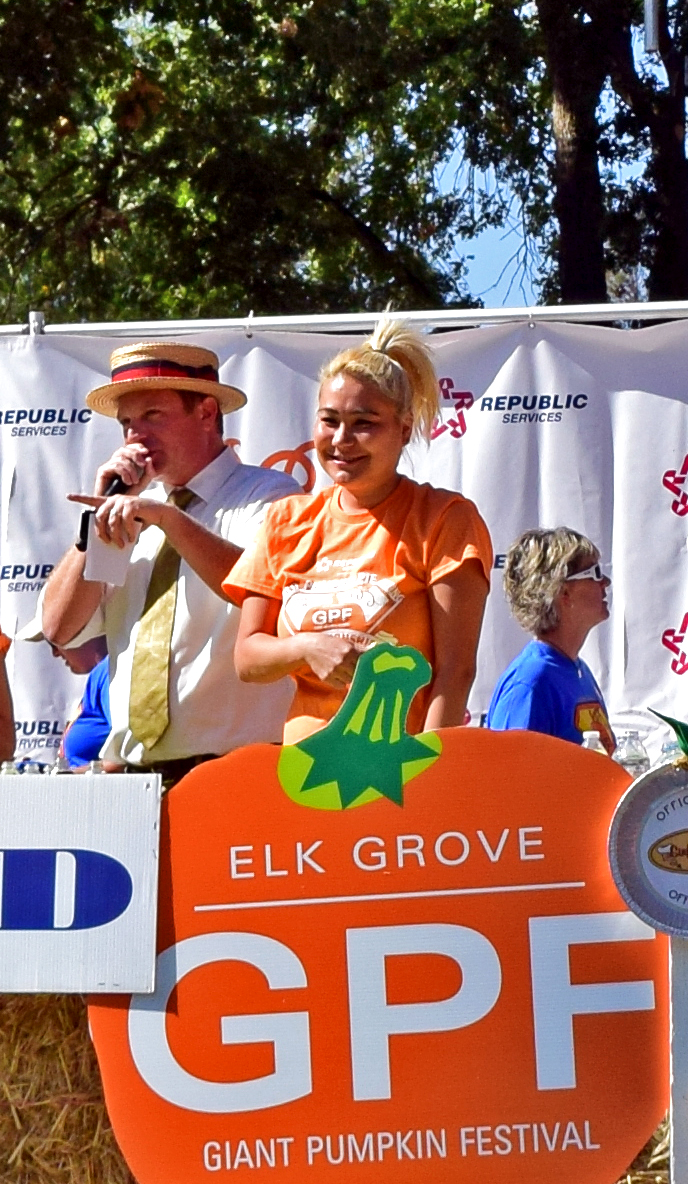
- Miki Sudo at the 2015 Pumpkin Festival Competitive Eating contest
- Born: July 23, 1985 (age 41); New York, New York, U.S.
- Occupation: Competitive eater
- Spouse: Nick Wehry (m. 2021)
- Children: 1

Miki Victoria Sudo (born July 23, 1985) is an American competitive eater. She has been undefeated in the women's competition at the Nathan's Hot Dog Eating Contest, with a twelve-year winning streak since 2014, unseating Sonya Thomas, who had won the women's competition since its inception in 2011 (the streak excludes 2021, in which she did not compete because of her pregnancy). She captured a record twelfth title in 2026. She has the current women's record for the contest, with 51 hot dogs eaten, which she did in 2024.

== Early life ==
Sudo was born to a European-American mother and Japanese father. At the age of five, she moved to Japan with her family and lived there for seven years before returning to the United States.

== Competitive eating career ==
Sudo entered the competitive eating circuit in 2013, winning a pho eating contest. In 2014 she became Major League Eating's top ranked female competitive eater, and in 2015 reached the top three overall. She is ranked 3rd in the world with Major League Eating as of 2022, and holds 4 world records in Kimchi, Hotdish, ice cream, and the women's record for hot dogs.

Sudo won her first Nathan's Hot Dog Eating Contest in 2014, upsetting three-time champion Sonya Thomas in the annual July 4 competition. This began a streak of seven consecutive victories, including a then-women's world record with 48.5 hot dogs and buns in the 2020 contest, held indoors without spectators due to the COVID-19 pandemic. She did not compete in the 2021 edition as she was eight months pregnant.

In 2024, Sudo became the first woman to reach the 50-hot dog mark in the competition.

=== Nathan's Famous Hot Dog Eating Contest results ===
2026 Contest	38.75	1st place
2025 Contest	33	1st place
2024 Contest	51	1st place and World Record
2023 Contest	39.5	1st place
2022 Contest	40	1st place
2020 Contest	48.5	1st place
2019 Contest	31	1st place
2018 Contest	37	1st place
2017 Contest	41	1st place
2016 Contest	38.5	1st place
2015 Contest	38	1st place
2014 Contest	34	1st place

=== Other achievements ===
Event Name	Placement	Total	Unit	Duration	Location	Date
Inaugural Eating Uranus Fudge Galactic Championship	4th	8.5	pounds	8 min	Uranus, Missouri	2024 Mar 30
Knott's Boysenberry Festival World Pie Eating Championship	3rd	9.5	pounds	8 min	Buena Park, CA	2016 Mar 19
Silver Slipper World Meat Pie Eating Championship	2nd	21.5	meat pies	10 min	Bay St. Louis, MS	2016 Mar 5
The Palm Beach Outlets World Birthday Cake-Eating Championship	2nd	9	pounds	8 min	West Palm Beach, FL	2016 Feb 14
World Chili Eating Challenge	3rd	6	32 oz. bowls	6 min	Orlando, FL	2016 Feb 6
World Famous St. Elmo Shrimp Cocktail-Eating Championship	2nd	7.42	pounds	8 min	Indianapolis, IN	2015 Dec 5
Foxwoods World Turkey-Eating Championship	1st	8.8	pounds	10 min	Mashantucket, CT	2015 Nov 21
World Record Gumbo Eating Championship	2nd	14.5	pounds	8 min	Larose, LA	2015 Nov 7
Siegi's World Championship Bratwurst Eating Contest	2nd	43	sausages	10 min	Tulsa, OK	2015 Oct 24
Martorano's Masters World Pasta Eating Championship	2nd	7	pounds	8 min	Las Vegas, NV	2015 Oct 17
Elk Grove Giant Pumpkin Festival World Pumpkin Pie Eating Championship	2nd	13.75	pounds	8 min	Elk Grove, CA	2015 Oct 4
Western Days Festival World Tamale Eating Championship	1st	61	tamales	12 min	Lewisville, TX	2015 Sep 26
U.S. National Buffalo Wing Eating Championship	2nd	170	wings	12 min	Buffalo, NY	2015 Sep 6
Buffalo Buffet Bowl	3rd	5	lbs. food	10m32s	Buffalo, NY	2015 Sep 5
John Ascuaga's Nugget World Rib Eating Championship	3rd	6.25	pounds	12 min	Sparks, NV	2015 Sep 2
Day-Lee Foods World Gyoza Eating Championship	3rd	178	gyozas	10 min	Los Angeles, CA	2015 Aug 22
Chacho's World Taco Eating Contest	3rd	58	tacos	8 min	San Jose, CA	2015 Aug 15
Hooters World Wing Eating Championship	7th	154	wings	10 min	Clearwater, FL	2015 Jul 25
Nathan's Famous Hot Dog Eating Contest - women	1st	38	hot dogs	10 min	Brooklyn, NY	2015 Jul 4
Meadowlands Racing & Entertainment World Pork Roll-Eating Championship	2nd	5.5	pounds	10 min	East Rutherford, NJ	2015 Jun 20
Ribfest Chicago's RIBMANIA Eating Championship	2nd	2.9	pounds	8 min	Chicago, IL	2015 Jun 12
Denver Outlaws World Burrito Eating Championship Presented By Illegal Pete's	2nd	13.875	pounds	10 min	Denver, CO	2015 May 24
West Virginia Three Rivers Festival Pepperoni Roll Eating World Championship	2nd	28.5	rolls	10 min	Fairmont, WV	2015 May 23
Niko Niko's World Gyro Eating Championship	3rd	14.5	gyros	10 min	Houston, TX	2015 May 17
The Knott's Boysenberry Festival World Pie Eating Championship	2nd	11.3	pounds	8 min	Buena Park, CA	2015 Mar 28
World Chili Eating Challenge	2nd	7.25	bowls	6 min	Orlando, FL	2015 Mar 7
The Palm Beach Outlets World Birthday Cake-Eating Championship	2nd	9	pounds	8 min	West Palm Beach, FL	2015 Feb 14
Foxwoods World Turkey-Eating Championship	3rd	6.2	pounds	10 min	Mashantucket, CT	2014 Nov 22
Horseshoe World Pierogi-Eating Championship	3rd	83	pierogies	8 min	Hammond, IN	2014 Oct 8
Elk Grove Giant Pumpkin Festival World Pumpkin Pie Eating Championship	3rd	12.5	pies	8 min	Elk Grove, CA	2014 Oct 5
Western Days Festival World Tamale Eating Championship	2nd	65	tamales	12 min	Lewisville, TX	2014 Sep 27
World Oyster Eating Championship	2nd	145	oysters	3 min	Hillsborough, Northern Ireland	2014 Sep 6
John Ascuaga's Nugget World Rib Eating Championship	3rd	6.4375	pounds	12 min	Sparks, NV	2014 Aug 27
Day-Lee Foods World Gyoza Eating Championship	3rd	199	dumplings	10 min	Los Angeles, CA	2014 Aug 16
Nathan's Famous Hot Dog Eating Contest - women	1st	34	hot dogs	10 min	Brooklyn, NY	2014 Jul 4
Nathan's Famous Hot Dog Eating Contest Qualifier	1st	40	hot dogs	10 min	Sonoma, CA	2014 Jun 22
Ribfest Chicago's RIBMANIA Eating Championship	1st	4.8	pounds	8 min	Chicago, IL	2014 Jun 6
West Virginia Three Rivers Festival Pepperoni Roll Eating World Championship	2nd	26	rolls	10 min	Fairmont, WV	2014 May 24
National Sweet Corn Eating Championship	2nd	42	ears	12 min	West Palm Beach, FL	2014 Apr 27
World Deep-Fried Asparagus Eating Championship	3rd	7.25	pounds	10 min	Stockton, CA	2014 Apr 26
Magnify Credit Union World Ice Cream Eating Championship	2nd	13.5	pints	6 min	Lakeland, FL	2014 Apr 12
Creek Indian Taco Eating Contest at Wind Creek's THROW DOWN	3rd	18.5	Indian tacos	8 min	Atmore, AL	2014 Mar 29
World Twinkie Eating Championship	3rd	71	Twinkies	6 min	Tunica, MS	2013 Oct 26
Ben's Chili Bowl World Chili Eating Championship	3rd	1.687	gallons	6 min	Washington, DC	2013 Oct 12
Radcliff Days World Hard-Boiled Egg Eating Championship	3rd	109	eggs	8 min	Radcliff, KY	2013 Oct 5
Western Days Festival World Tamale Eating Championship	3rd	76	tamales	10 min	Lewisville, TX	2013 Sep 28
Oktoberfest Zinzinnati World Bratwurst-Eating Championship	2nd	61.5	sausages	10 min	Cincinnati, OH	2013 Sep 22
U.S. National Buffalo Wing Eating Championship	1st	6.7	pounds	12 min	Buffalo, NY	2013 Sep 1
Buffalo Buffet Bowl	1st	5	lbs. misc items	4m17s	Buffalo, NY	2013 Aug 31
John Ascuaga's Nugget World Rib Eating Championship	3rd	7.1	pounds	12 min	Sparks, NV	2013 Aug 28
Day-Lee Foods World Gyoza Eating Championship	3rd	204	dumplings	10 min	Los Angeles, CA	2013 Aug 17
World Kimchi Eating Championship	1st	17	plates	6 min	Chicago, IL	2013 Aug 11
Hooters World Wing Eating Championship	2nd	155	wings	10 min	Clearwater, FL	2013 Jul 25
Hooters Wing Eating Qualifier	1st	192	wings	10 min	Las Vegas, NV	2013 Jun 26
Ribfest Chicago's RIBMANIA Eating Championship	1st	2.9	pounds	6 min	Chicago, IL	2013 Jun 7
West Virginia Three Rivers Festival Pepperoni Roll Eating World Championship	2nd	27.5	rolls	10 min	Fairmont, WV	2013 May 25
World Gyro Eating Championship	3rd	15.5	gyros	10 min	Houston, TX	2013 May 19
World Deep-Fried Asparagus Eating Championship	3rd	7.5	pounds	10 min	Stockton, CA	2013 Apr 27
Nathan's Famous Hot Dog Eating Contest Qualifier	1st	40	hot dogs	10 min	Las Vegas, NV	2013 Apr 20

== Personal life ==
Sudo has been in a relationship with fellow competitive eater Nick Wehry since 2018. In January 2021, the couple announced they were expecting their first child; as a result, Sudo skipped the 2021 Nathan's Hot Dog Eating Contest. They were engaged in April of that same year. Sudo still served as a commentator for the Nathan’s event on ESPN. They were married between 2021 and 2022.

She attended Hillsborough College in Tampa, Florida from 2023-26, graduating in May 2026 with a degree in dental hygiene.

== See also ==
- List of competitive eaters
