= Gersh Kuntzman =

American journalist

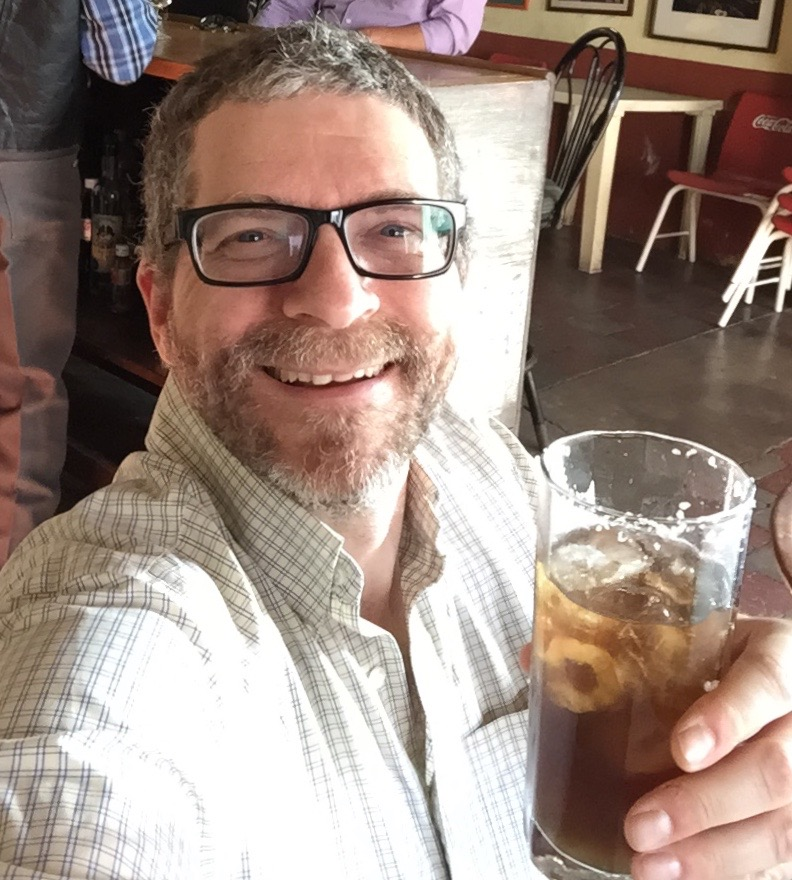
- Kuntzman in 2015
- Born: 1964 or 1965 (age 61–62); Westchester County, New York
- Occupation: Journalist
- Website: gershkuntzman.homestead.com

Gersh Kuntzman (born 1964/1965) is an American journalist and anti-car activist.

== Early life and education ==
Kuntzman was born in Westchester County and moved to Brooklyn in 1989. He studied Russian language and literature at university.

== Career ==
Kuntzman began his journalism career at The Upper West Side Resident, a small local paper, after dropping out of graduate school before becoming a reporter at the features desk of the New York Post.

In 2005, Kuntzman became editor of The Brooklyn Paper, a group of community newspapers covering Kings County, New York. During his tenure, he won awards for Editor of the Year and Columnist of the Year from the Suburban Newspapers of America. His editorial writing also won awards from the Independent Free Papers of America. That organization also gave The Brooklyn Paper its Vic Jose Award in 2009.

In 2012, Kuntzman left The Brooklyn Paper to teach students at the CUNY Graduate School of Journalism about local reporting. That same year, he joined the New York Daily News, where he worked until 2017.

In 2016, Kuntzman became the center of widespread attention after he wrote an article titled, "Firing an AR-15 is horrifying, menacing, and very very loud." In the article, Kuntzman says that he traveled to a gun range in Philadelphia to shoot a "military-style weapon" so that he could better understand such weapons' appeals in the wake of the Orlando nightclub shooting. He said, "It felt to me like a bazooka—and sounded like a cannon." Kuntzman further described the experience by saying that "The recoil bruised my shoulder" and "The smell of sulfur and destruction made me sick." Some felt the most controversial part of the article was when Kuntzman claimed, "The explosions—like a bomb—gave me a temporary form of PTSD". Kuntzman faced widespread ridicule for the article, particularly the claim that he suffered from PTSD, with some critics saying such a claim diminished the severity of PTSD suffered by veterans. Kuntzman later wrote another article further criticizing gun owners, noting that many of them had sent him videos of "7-, 10- and 12-year old girls" firing the weapon while smiling.

Following the assassination of Andrei Karlov, Russian ambassador to Turkey, on 19 December 2016, Kuntzman compared his murder by Mevlüt Mert Altıntaş to the assassination of Nazi German diplomat Ernst vom Rath by Jewish student Herschel Grynszpan, saying "justice has been served". The Russian Foreign Ministry spokeswoman wrote on her Facebook page to Kuntzman: "you have said that the fight of the Jewish people against anti-Semitism in 1930s amounts to the terrorist ways of the Islamic State and Jabhat al-Nusra ... Are they really the same to you?"

In 2017, Kuntzman began work as breaking news editor of Newsweek; he was fired in February 2018. He joined Streetsblog NYC as its editor-in-chief later that year in July.

== Activism ==
Kuntzman was featured in a December 2022 New York Times article that focused on citizens "cleaning up" license plates which had been intentionally damaged or obscured for the purpose of avoiding tolls and speed cameras. A subsequent article in The New Yorker and a segment on This American Life featured the same work.

== Personal life ==
Kuntzman is the author of a 2001 book on baldness, Hair!, and the playwright of a 2005 musical mocking the SUV industry, which was shown at the New York International Fringe Festival. He is Jewish.
