= Takeru Kobayashi =

Japanese former competitive eater (born 1978)

- 小林 尊
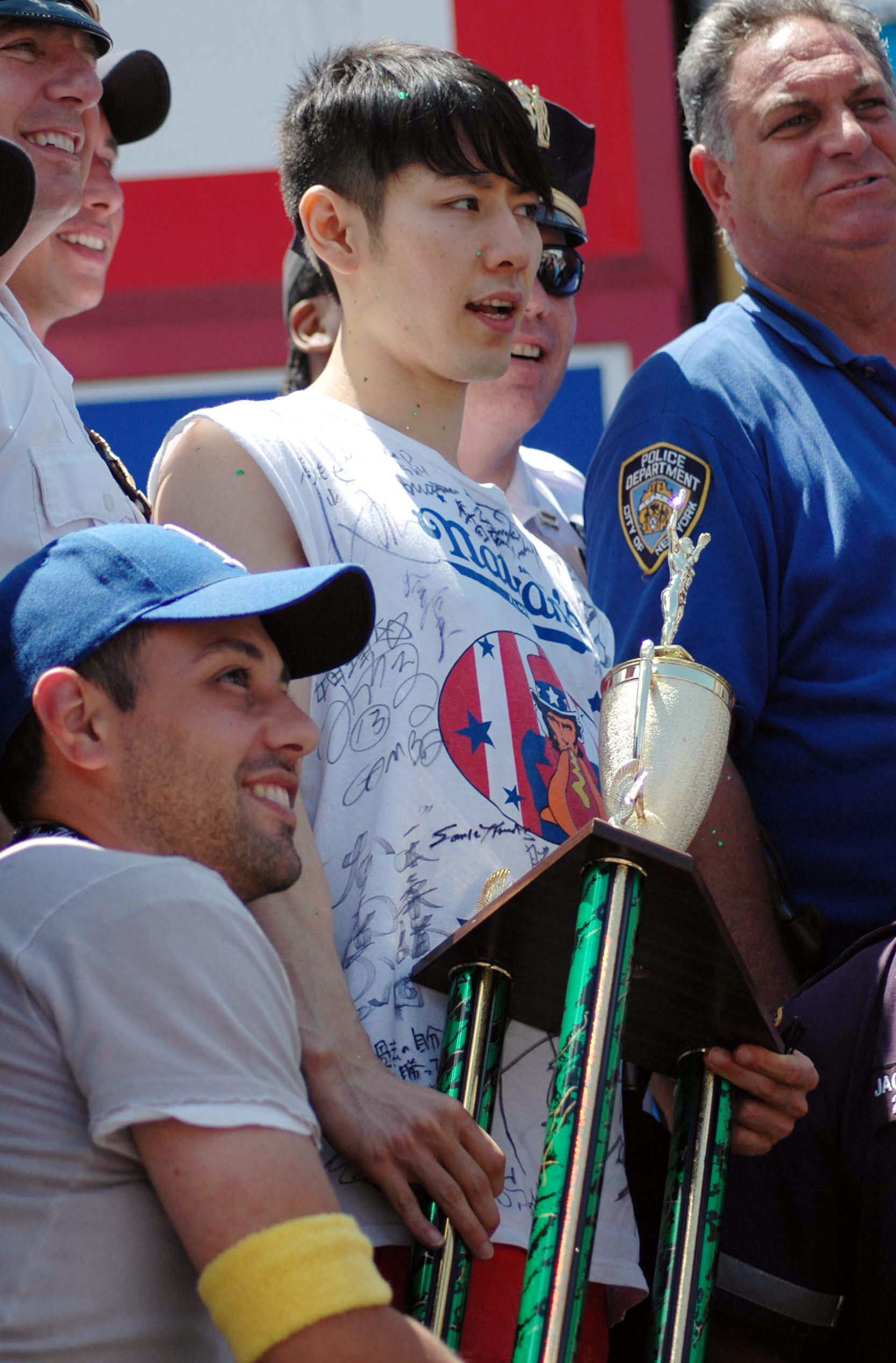
- Takeru Kobayashi at the Nathan's Hot Dog Eating Contest in 2009
- Born: March 15, 1978 (age 48); Nagano, Japan
- Other names: "The Tsunami", "The Prince", "Kobi"
- Education: Yokkaichi University
- Height: 5 ft 8 in (1.73 m)
- Spouse: Maggie James

Takeru "Tsunami" Kobayashi (小林 尊, Kobayashi Takeru; born March 15, 1978) is a Japanese former competitive eater. Described as "the godfather of competitive eating", he is a six-time Nathan's Hot Dog Eating Contest champion and widely credited with popularizing the sport.

== Competition and records ==
Born in Nagano, Japan, he won the 2000 Japanese variety show TV Champion Gluttony Championship by eating 16 bowls of ramen in 1 hour in the final. Also competing in the popular TV show Food Battle Club, he went on to win the final round of several stages, besting his mentor and previous champion. This resulted in a frenzy of fame for him in Japan and Asia before he appeared in the United States.

Kobayashi set his first world record in western culture in his rookie appearance on July 4, 2001, when he ate 50 hot dogs in 12 minutes at the Nathan's Coney Island Hot Dog Eating Contest, almost doubling the previous record of 25 1/8. The record was so unexpected that the organizers ran out of signs indicating how many hot dogs Kobayashi had eaten and had to resort to handwritten signs. He would go on to break his own record three times in winning the contest 6 consecutive times (2001–2006). Kobayashi is known for having created the "Solomon Method" of separating the hot dog from the bun then breaking it in half, while eating the dogs, then dunking the buns in water to wash the dogs down quickly. As this method became the basis to the competition for all the competitors, it also became apparent amongst the eaters, that Kobayashi's main opponent would dunk their own buns into the water while dissolving them, allowing his opponent to cheat. This later resulted in Kobayashi changing his own dunking technique and refusing to eat at any further hot dog competitions unless agreeing to a "No Dunking Rule". After much controversy between Kobayashi and the abuse he sustained from Major League Eating, he left the competition altogether to compete in a new taco competition called The Gringo Bandito Taco Eating Challenge, sponsored by Dexter Holland from The Offspring. Kobayashi went on to be the undefeated champion for nine years, his best score being 159 tacos in 10 minutes, until 2018 when the competition came to an end.

2006

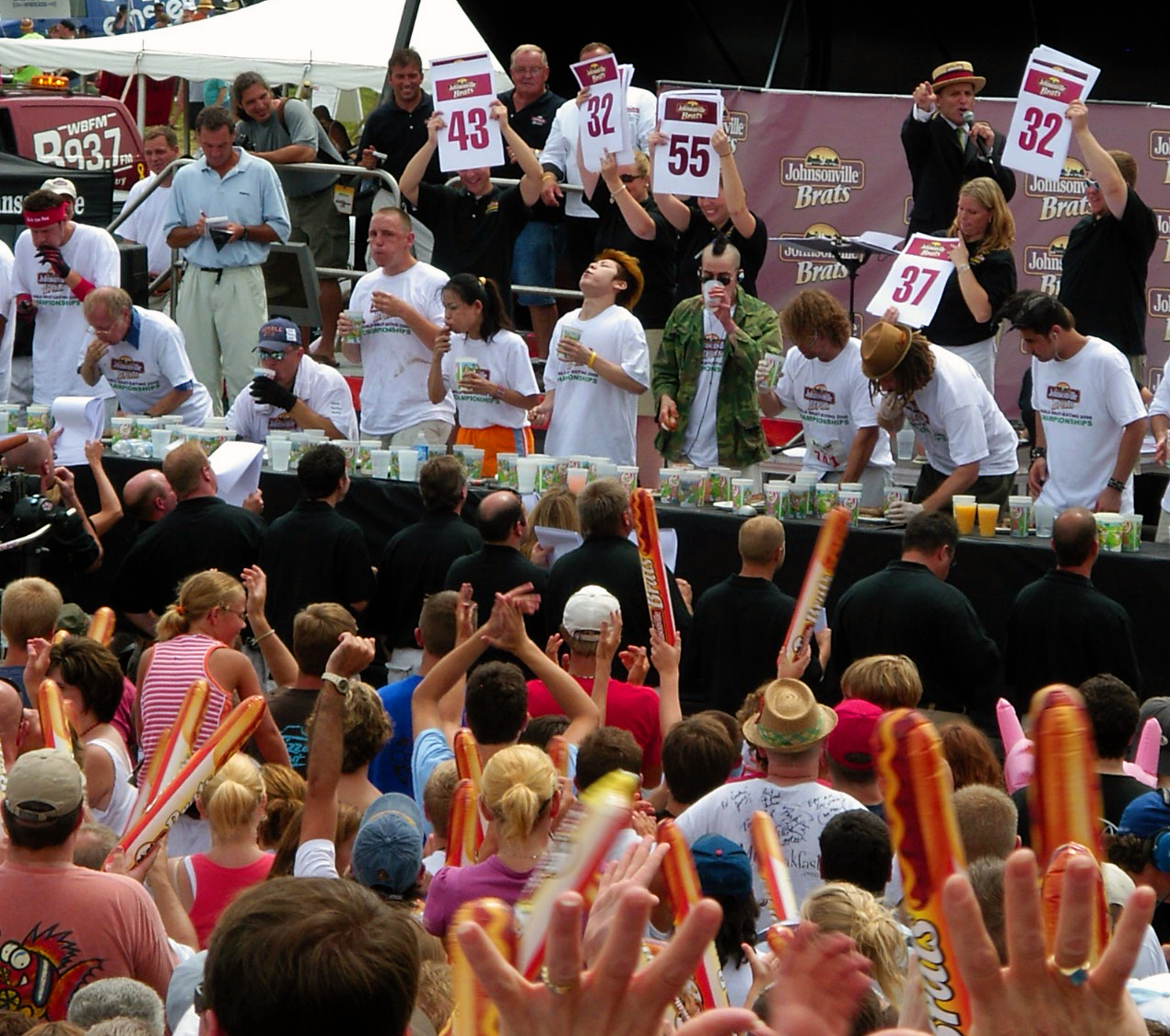
Kobayashi at the Johnsonville World Bratwurst Eating Championship in 2006

In the 2006 Krystal Square Off, Kobayashi's mark of 97 hamburgers was 30 better than his winning total in 2005 and 28 better than the world record he set in 2004. At a speed-eating contest in Hong Kong on August 13, 2005, Kobayashi consumed 83 vegetarian jiaozi dumplings in 8 minutes. The next day, he ate 100 roasted pork buns in 12 minutes. Kobayashi also won the 2005 Alka-Seltzer US Open of Competitive Eating, a three-hour International Federation of Competitive Eating (IFOCE), elimination tournament on ESPN, as well as the Glutton Bowl, a two-hour IFOCE eating special that aired on the Fox Network in 2002. On Fox's 2003 show Man vs. Beast, Kobayashi lost in an eating competition against a 1089-pound (494 kg) Kodiak bear, when he ate 31 bunless hot dogs in 2 minutes and 36 seconds to the bear's 50. In a 2014 interview, Kobayashi claims to have beaten the bear in the rehearsal. On August 5, 2006, Kobayashi set yet another world record at the Johnsonville World Bratwurst Eating Championship in Sheboygan, Wisconsin, by downing 58 bratwurst sausages in 10 minutes, shattering the previous record of 35 set the previous year by Sonya Thomas. On September 23, 2006, Takeru Kobayashi set the world record at the Phantom Food Festival in Boston, for eating 41 Summer Shack lobster rolls in 10 minutes, replacing the previous record of 22 rolls. Other world-eating records held by Kobayashi include 17.7 pounds (8.0 kg) of cow brains in 15 minutes and 20 pounds (9.1 kg) of rice balls in 30 minutes.

2007

On June 25, 2007, Kobayashi announced on his blog that he seriously injured his jaw during training. He stated that he could only open his jaw about the width of a fingertip. Kobayashi's participation in the July 4, 2007, Nathan's contest continued as scheduled. He was able to eat a personal record 63 hot dogs, though his mark was bettered by Joey Chestnut's 66.

2008

On July 4, 2008, Kobayashi once again competed in the Nathan's contest. He ate 59 hot dogs, tying Chestnut, but lost a sudden death five dog eat off to finish second. This was controversial, as the five dog eat off was decided at the spur of the moment, and had not been an official rule previously, to decide a winner in the circumstance of a tie.

2009

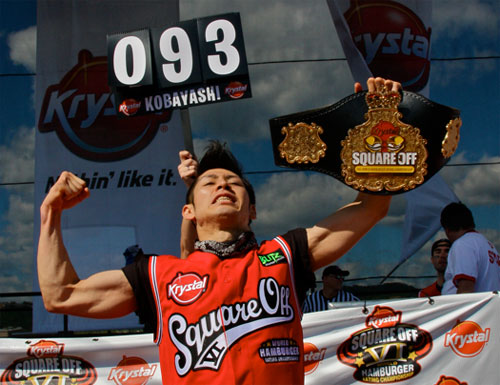
Kobayashi at the Krystal Square Off in 2009

Kobayashi went on to defeat Joey Chestnut, on May 31, 2009, in a Pizza Hut P'Zone competition at Sony Studios in Culver City, California. The competition aired on Spike TV on June 21. In July 2009, Kobayashi visited Puerto Rico in a special appearance for Taco Bell's Why Pay More Challenge, eating 64 tacos in 15 minutes for a local charity. On July 4, 2009, he competed again in the Nathan's contest. He ate 64.5 hot dogs to Joey Chestnut's 68. On September 27, 2009, Kobayashi defeated Chestnut with a score of 93 (68 Krystals, 5 Big Angus Burgers), earning the $20,000 top prize. Chestnut was second, with 81, and Pat "Deep Dish" Bertoletti finished third, with 76.

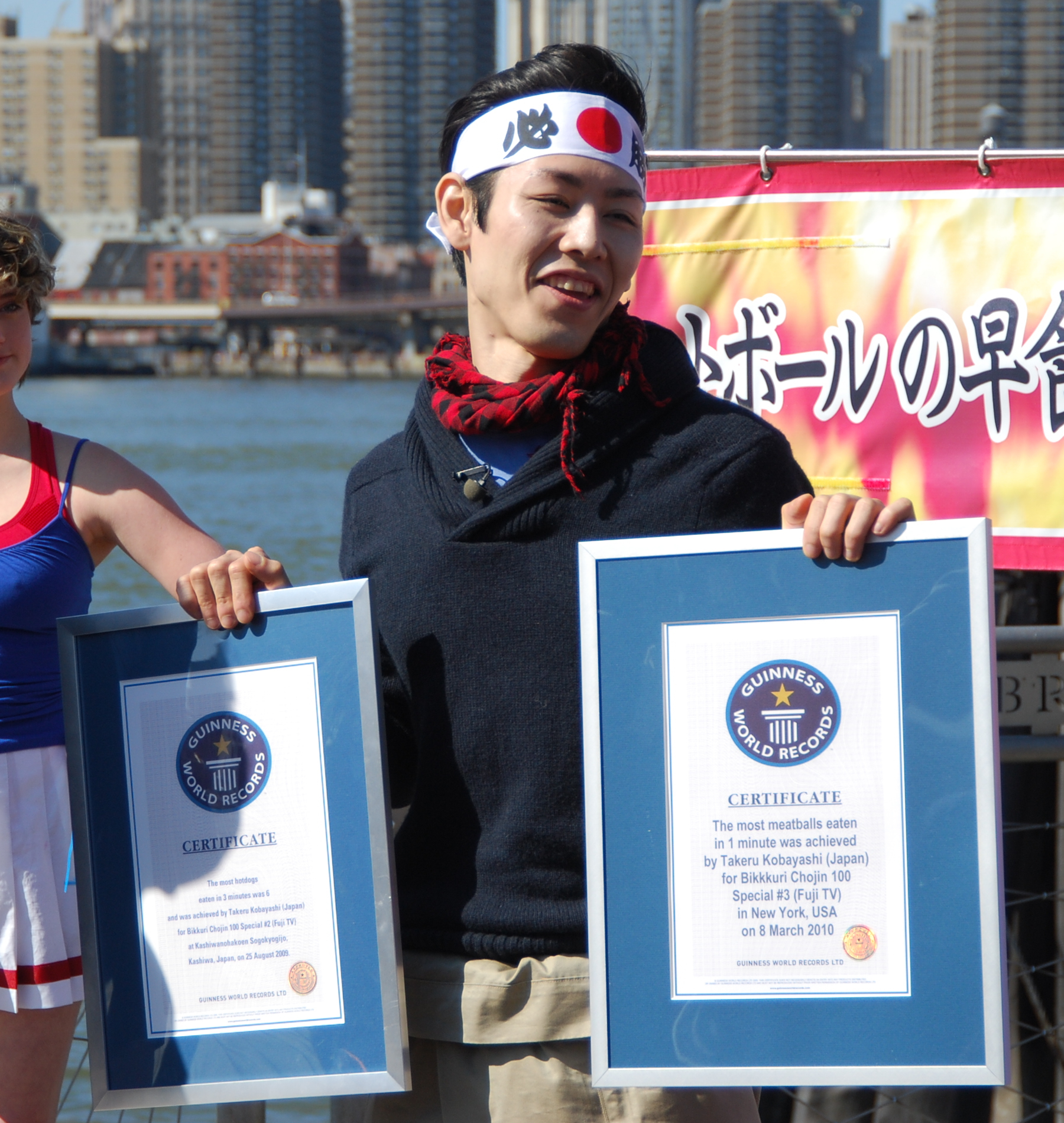
Kobayashi with two Guinness World Record certificates (March 2010)

2011

On July 4, 2011, Kobayashi competed on the rooftop of a Manhattan bar simultaneously with the Nathan's Contest at Coney Island via a live video simulcast of the event. Kobayashi finished 69 hot dogs, one more than the officially recognized world record at the time.

2012

On January 23, 2012. Kobayashi went on The Wendy Williams Show to set the record for eating the most Twinkies in one minute, for the "Save The Twinkie" campaign, and set a new world record of 14 Twinkies. On February 3, 2012, Kobayashi set the new Wing Bowl record for eating chicken wings at Wing Bowl XX, held at the Wells Fargo Center in Philadelphia. His total was 337 wings in his first competition in that event. On August 26, 2012, Kobayashi set the new world record at the New York State Fair in Syracuse for eating 110 hot dogs in 10 minutes. In October 2012, Kobayashi set the new world record at the State Fair of Texas for eating 60 hot dogs in 2 minutes 35 seconds. On June 30, 2012, Kobayashi revealed the terms of the Major League Eating (MLE) contract he was required to sign in order to compete in Nathan's Fourth of July hot dog eating competition. The year-long contract limited him to $40,000 and took away any rights to endorse or engage in anything outside of what MLE mandated. On July 4, 2012, Kobayashi competed in the Crif Dog Classic. He ate 58.5 hot dogs and buns. On October 11, 2012, Kobayashi set the new world record at the Gringo Bandito Taco Challenge by eating 106 tacos in 10 minutes

2013

On July 21, 2013, Kobayashi defended his title at the Gringo Bandito Taco Challenge. On October 6, 2013, Kobayashi won "LET 'EM EAT" Canada's biggest pizza eating contest for the fourth year in a row.

2014

On August 4, 2014, Kobayashi set the new world record at "LET 'EM EAT" Canada's biggest pizza eating contest by eating 62 slices of pizza (15 and a half pizzas) in 12 minutes.

2024

In May 2024, Kobayashi announced his retirement from competitive eating, citing long-term health concerns including damage to his digestive system and loss of the ability to fully taste and smell food.

Although he had announced his retirement earlier in 2024, Kobayashi agreed to return for the Netflix live event Unfinished Beef against Joey Chestnut in September 2024, stating that he wanted their long-standing rivalry to be resolved on a global stage.

Kobayashi competed against Joey Chestnut in September 2024 in a live-streamed Netflix event titled "Chestnut vs. Kobayashi: Unfinished Beef". Chestnut defeated Kobayashi, eating 83 hot dogs in 10 minutes. Kobayashi ate 66 hot dogs, breaking his personal best that he set in 2009 at the Nathan's Hot Dog Eating Contest.

=== Nathan's Famous Hot Dog Eating Contest results ===
2009 Contest	64.5	2nd place
2008 Contest	59	2nd place
2007 Contest	63	2nd place
2006 Contest	53.75	1st place
2005 Contest	49	1st place
2004 Contest	53.5	1st place
2003 Contest	44.5	1st place
2002 Contest	50.5	1st place
2001 Contest	50	1st place

== Training and techniques ==
Kobayashi expands his stomach for a competition by eating larger and larger amounts of food, and then exercises to ensure that fat will not impede expansion of his stomach during a competition. His official web site gives his height as 173 cm (68 in) and his weight as 58 kg (128 lb). As of July 4, 2009, Kobayashi weighed in at 60 kg (132 lb) for the annual 4 July hot dog eating competition on Coney Island. Kobayashi is also known for his trademark body wiggle, referred to by some as the "Kobayashi Shake", to force food down his esophagus and settle more compactly in his stomach. He eats hot dogs by splitting the frankfurter in half, dipping the buns in water, and then stuffing both parts in his mouth. He calls this the Solomon Method.

In the Japanese TV program "TV Champion", in a competition to see how much ramen one can eat in 1 hour, Kobayashi adopted a tactic of lifting the noodles at once to allow air to pass through the noodles, and then putting them in his mouth after they had cooled down.

== World records held ==
- Bunless hot dogs: 110 bunless hot dogs in 10 minutes at the New York State Fair
- Bunless hot dogs: 60 bunless hot dogs in 2 minutes and 35 seconds at the Texas State Fair on 12 October 2012
- Rice balls: 150 rice balls (20 pounds) in 30 minutes "Food Battle Club" Tokyo Broadcasting System Television
- Grilled Cheese Sandwiches: 13 grilled cheese sandwiches in 1 minute at South by Southwest
- Buffalo wings: 337 buffalo wings in 30 minutes at The 20th Annual Wing Bowl on 3 February 2012
- Lobster rolls: 41 lobster rolls at the Phantom Food Festival in Boston, Massachusetts, for eating in 10 minutes
- Cow brains: 57 Cow Brains (17.7 pounds) in 15 minutes "Glutton Bowl" Fox
- Hamburgers: 93 hamburgers in 8 minutes at the Krystal Square Off World Hamburger Eating Championship in Chattanooga (No Dunking World Record)
- Tacos: 159 tacos in 10 minutes at the Gringo Bandito Chronic Tacos Challenge on April 8, 2017
- Pizza: 62 slices of pizza (15 and a half pizzas) in 12 minutes in Canada
- Chicken satay: 11.92 pounds of chicken satay at Robertson Walk, Singapore on 27 July 2008
- Cheesesteak: 1 cheesesteak in 24.3 seconds at The 19th Annual Wing Bowl on 4 February 2011
- Soba noodles: 21.3 pounds of soba in 12 minutes "TV Champion" TV Tokyo Corporation

== Contractual dispute and Nathan's Famous ban ==
=== July 2010 controversy ===
On June 28, 2010, Kobayashi announced he would not compete in the Nathan's Fourth of July Hot Dog Eating Competition, reportedly due to the company's insistence that Kobayashi sign an exclusive contract.

On July 4, 2010, Kobayashi was in attendance watching from the crowd at the Nathan's International Hot Dog Eating Contest. Wearing a black T-shirt that read "Free Kobi", Kobayashi mingled with the crowd, standing inside a police-barricaded pen just under the stage. After the competition ended, the spectators began chanting his name loudly, demanding that they "let him eat". Accordingly, Kobayashi indulged their wishes by climbing up onto the stage to a thunderous ovation. Although he was initially ushered by security officers up to the stage, one security officer (thought to have been requested by George Shea) arrested him from behind, and Kobayashi began resisting and thrashing his body around at the officials attempting to commandeer him. A struggle ensued, eventually resulting in Kobayashi being thrown against the barricades and tossed into the fences before finally being handcuffed and placed inside a police car. Some witnesses reported that Kobayashi was simply intending to shake the hand of the winner, Joey Chestnut, as a gesture of sportsmanship and goodwill. This has led analysts to believe that Kobayashi was fully intent on a contract renegotiation with MLE, and that congratulating Chestnut loosely resembled a "peace offering" from Kobayashi. Co-host and MLE President Richard Shea stated that "[Kobayashi] tried to jump on stage during the awards ceremony to disrupt it." He was charged with resisting arrest, trespassing, and obstructing government administration and subsequently was taken to jail, awaiting an appearance in Brooklyn Criminal Court.

Kobayashi's interpreter and publicist, Maggie James (later, his wife), said he had originally gone in hopes to cheer on his fellow competitive eaters, but after arriving at the venue only to hear support from the fans demanding that they "let him eat," he was swooped onto the stage due to the excitement. She said "There's a contract dispute, they weren't giving him his freedom. It was unfair." Kobayashi told reporters he had a sandwich and a glass of milk while being held. "I am very hungry," he said. "I wish there were hot dogs in jail." On August 5, 2010, all charges against Kobayashi were dismissed by a judge in Brooklyn. Despite his record six consecutive victories in their annual event, Nathan’s removed Kobayashi’s image from their "Wall of Fame" in 2011. After Kobayashi left Nathan's, the hot dog contest lost sponsorship from Old Navy, Heinz Tomato Ketchup, and Pepto-Bismol, and its year-to-year Nielsen ratings fell. With an average 0.7 HH U.S. rating, it was off a tenth of a point from 2012, when it aired on ESPN. ESPN averaged 1.949 million viewers for 2011’s Nathan's Famous Hot Dog Eating Contest but went down 41%, to 1.15 million viewers, in 2013.

=== July 4, 2011 competing events ===
In 2011, Kobayashi was still barred from the annual Nathan's event due to the contract dispute. On July 4, he competed on the rooftop of a Manhattan bar, 230 Fifth, for the duration of the Coney Island contest. Two official judges from the Athletic Association of NY observed Kobayashi while the live broadcast of the event played next to him on a large television screen. Kobayashi finished 69 hot dogs, one more than the officially recognized world record at the time.

=== July 4, 2012 competing events ===
In 2012, Kobayashi was still barred from the annual Nathan's event due to the contract dispute. Kobayashi ate 58.5 at Crif dog classic, eating a different type hot dog from Nathan's Famous Fourth of July International Hot Dog Eating Contest.

=== July 4, 2014 competing events ===
Kobayashi ate 113 bunless Nathan's hot dogs at 230 Fifth.

== Other pursuits ==
In 2005, Kobayashi appeared in a commercial for ESPN's SportsCenter. In 2007, Kobayashi appeared in commercials for MasterCard and Coors Light. In 2008 Kobayashi appeared in a Western Canada Lottery Corporation commercial. On May 30, 2009, Kobayashi attended the Spike Guys' Choice Awards.

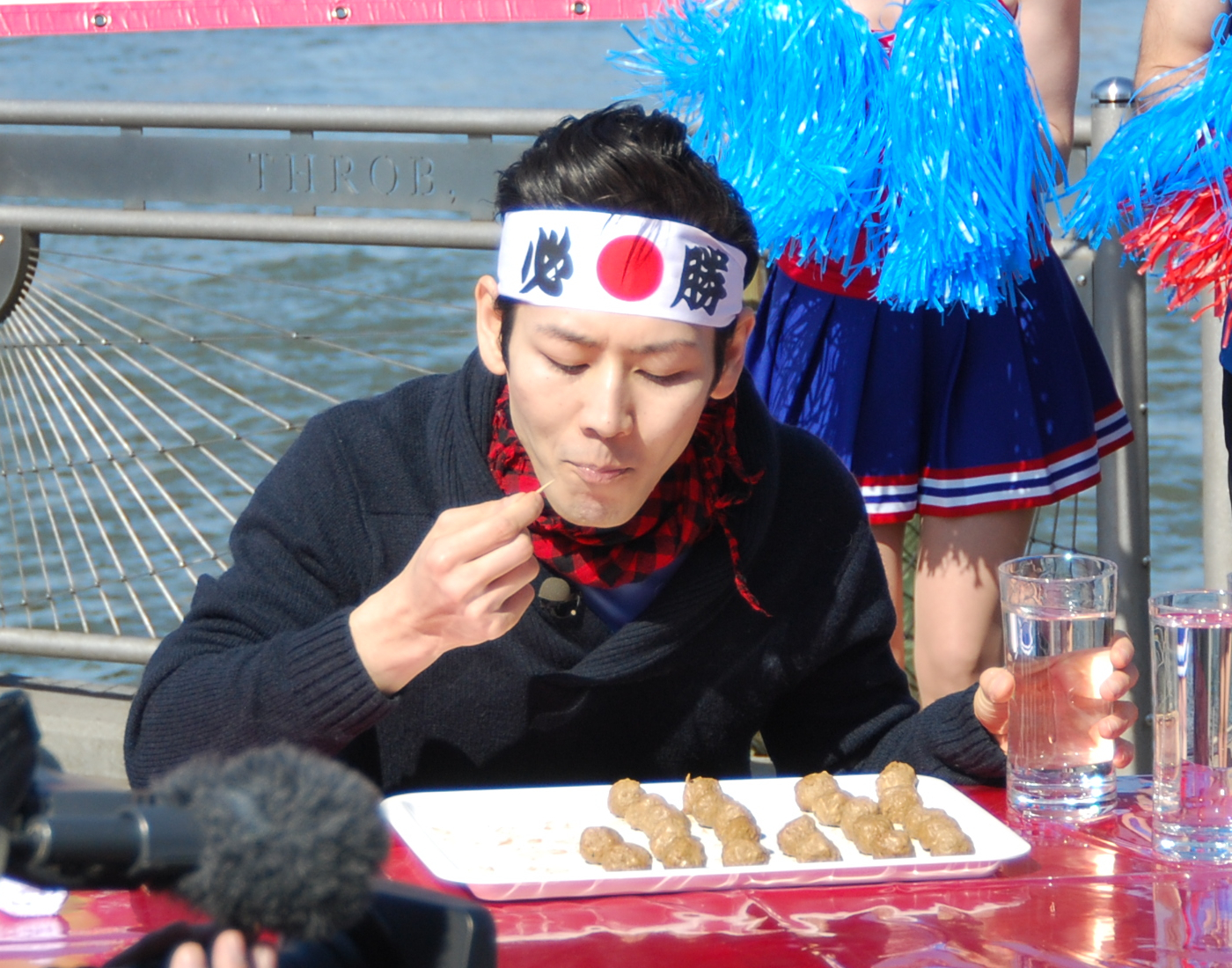
Takeru Kobayashi wearing a hachimaki, 2010

In November 2010, Kobayashi appeared in a magazine featuring men's clothing published as an offshoot of V magazine, VMAN 20th Winter. In November 2010, Kobayashi competed against Donkey Kong in a banana eating contest at the Rio-Can Centre in Toronto as part of the launch for Nintendo's Donkey Kong Country Returns. On July 7, 2011, Kobayashi made a guest appearance at Hewlett Packard event 2011. The other guests were Snoop Dogg, Sugar Ray, Dan Finnerty, Third Eye Blind, Candlebox. In 2011, Kobayashi appeared in TVB commercial. In Spring 2011, Kobayashi appeared in his first major fashion editorial in Canada's The Block magazine as a model. Additionally, Kobayashi is an aspiring dog trainer, with six labradoodles he calls his "hot dogs." In June 2012, Kobayashi made a special guest appearance and a taco demonstration at The Offspring's release party for their album Days Go By.

In 2012, Kobayashi appeared in an Eight O'Clock Coffee and a Hofmann commercial. In 2012, Kobayashi appeared on a celebrity edition of Fear Factor. In 2013, Kobayashi appeared in Just-Eat and Thuzio commercials. Kobayashi has been featured on Late Night with Jimmy Fallon, Saturday Night Live, MTV's True Life, MTV After Hours With Josh Horowitz, The Daily Show with Jon Stewart, The Wendy Williams Show and has done original features with Buzzfeed.com, CollegeHumor.com and SI.com, and is a featured user on the foodie mobile and web-based app Foodspotting. On July 4, 2013, Kobayashi unveiled his new line of all-beef midwestern grain-fed hot dogs, known officially as "Kobi Dogs" at Eventi Hotel in New York. On September 16, 2014, he appeared in a YouTube video competing with a hamster. The video ends with Kobayashi acknowledging his defeat by placing a medal around the hamster's neck. On September 22, 2015, Kobayashi, along with Patrick Bertoletti, Kevin Strahle and Bob Shoudt, consumed a 40-pound goat in 13 minutes and 22 seconds at Taco In A Bag in Chicago. In 2015, Takeru Kobayashi consumed 110 hot dogs without buns in 10 minutes. On April 26, 2019, Nicole Lucas Haimes' feature documentary The Good, The Bad, The Hungry premiered at The Tribeca Film Festival, with Kobayashi and Joey Chestnut in attendance.

== In popular culture ==
In the 93rd TV Funhouse short on the November 11th, 2006 episode of Saturday Night Live, Kobayashi is the titular character of "Kobayashi", a parody of popular anime series, namely Dragon Ball Z, where he appears in-between animated scenes as himself. Kobayashi's eating abilities partially inspired the King of the Hill episode "The Fat and the Furious". This episode originally aired on November 10, 2002. In 2004, a character inspired by Kobayashi, namely Kobarushi, appears in Megas XLR's episode "Bad Guy". Kobayashi also helped inspire the 2005 CSI: Crime Scene Investigation episode "Dog Eat Dog". The episode features a victim who ate himself to death, in part from eating several hot dogs at a hot dog eating contest. Kobayashi is mentioned by Will Ferrell's character, Ricky Bobby, in the 2006 film Talladega Nights: The Ballad of Ricky Bobby.

Referenced in movie Step Brothers by Randy (Rob Riggle) after Derek (Adam Scott) threatens that Randy will, "...eat Brennan's (Will Ferrell's) dick", if Brennan botches the Catalina Wine Mixer, Randy adds, "Like Kobayashi!". Kobayashi appears in the ending cinematic of level three, "Around the World in 80 Bites" in the 2007 video game, The Simpsons Game. In The Simpsons episode "Luca$" in the 25th season, the character Lucas Bortner wears a T-shirt with a photo of Kobayashi eating and refers to him in a dialogue. The Family Guy episode "Killer Queen" features a parody of Kobayashi named Charles Yamamoto (voiced by Robert Wu), a hot dog-eating champion who is dethroned by Chris Griffin at a hot dog-eating contest, later making numerous attempts on Chris' life in revenge for defeating and dishonoring him at the competition. In the 1000 Ways to Die skit "Vom-Ate-Dead", a professional eater modeled after Takeru Kobayashi is cornered by an emetophiliac woman who forces him to vomit on her, which causes her death when she chokes on an undigested piece of hot dog. Kobayashi appears as himself on a 2012 episode of Jake and Amir, a CollegeHumor web series. He becomes aggressive when Jake tries to feed him hot dogs. Kobayashi appears as himself in the movie The Houses October Built 2. He is in the Brain Eating Contest during the Zombie Pub Crawl in Minneapolis, Minnesota.

Kobayashi was featured in the 2024 Netflix documentary Hack your Health: Secrets of Your Gut, where he announced his retirement from competitive eating and a desire to create more healthy hot dogs.

== See also ==
- List of competitive eaters
