= List of competitive eaters =

The following is a list of notable competitive eaters.

== Men ==
- Beard Meats Food
- Patrick Bertoletti (2007–present)
- Eric Booker ("BadlandsChugs") (1997–present)
- Carmen Cincotti
- Dominic Cardo (2001–present)
- Joey Chestnut (2005–present)
- Crazy Legs Conti (2002–present)
- Erik "The Red" Denmark
- Michael DeVito
- Peter Dowdeswell
- Charles Hardy
- Furious Pete (2004–present)
- Tim Janus (2004–2016)
- Edward "Cookie" Jarvis (2001–2006)
- Steve Keiner
- Takeru Kobayashi (2001–present)
- L.A. Beast (2010–present)
- Joe LaRue
- Rich LeFevre (2002–present)
- Don Lerman
- Kevin Lipsitz
- Frankie MacDonald (2012–present)
- Bozo Miller
- David O'Karma
- Theetta Rappai
- Rick The Manager
- Yasir Salem (2012–present)
- Shoenice (2010-present)
- Bob Shoudt (1997–present)
- Matt Stonie (2009–present)
- Brian Subich
- Nick Wehry

== Women ==
- Takako Akasaka
- Carlene LeFevre
- Michelle Lesco
- Molly Schuyler (2012–present)
- Gal Sone
- Miki Sudo (2011–present)
- Raina Huang
- Sonya Thomas (2003–present)
- Shahina Waseem (2012–present)
- Nela Zisser
