= Rick the Manager =

American competitive eater

Rick The Manager
- Born: Richard Joseph Russo; April 6, 1965 (age 60); Norristown, Pennsylvania, U.S.
- Occupation: Competitive Eater
- Years active: 2005–present
- Spouse: Sherri Russo (2007–present)

Rick The Manager (born Richard Joseph "Rick" Russo in Norristown, Pennsylvania) is an American independent competitive eater currently residing in Royersford, Pennsylvania with his wife, Sherri. The self-proclaimed Competitive Eating Extraordinaire is best known for his unique appearance, toting his signature two-toned goatee and sunglasses, and the motto he lives by, "Eat Each Meal Like It's Your Last!"

== Personal life and career ==
Rick The Manager is of Italian American descent, grew up in Collegeville, Pennsylvania and is a graduate of the Perkiomen Valley School District. A mere 100 pounds ago, Rick was training hard as a Pennsylvania state ranked long distance runner. While attending Shippensburg University, Rick was teammates with future US Olympic Team marathon runner, Steve Spence. Presently, outside of competitive eating, Rick owns and operates a landscaping company, moves dead bodies for a local funeral home, is a certified Pennsylvania high school basketball referee, and is currently working to launch a musical venture. In 2011, Rick The Manager Russo was voted Mr. Patch 2011 for the Limerick-Royersford-Spring City Patch, an online news service for his notoriety and community involvement. Rick is also a retired high school basketball coach.

== Birth of a stage name ==
In 2003, Rick Russo was labeled Rick The Driver for his role on the MTV reality show series Viva La Bam. Circa 2005, Rick started out in the world of competitive eating by managing numerous amateur competitive eaters. It was at this time he converted his name from his previous stint on MTV from Rick The Driver to Rick The Manager. Philadelphia radio personality Angelo Cataldi said that Rick The Manager was the best competitive eating manager that he had ever encountered.

A few years later, Rick made the leap from manager to eater. “Back stage to front stage,” as announced by George Shea of Major League Eating. Rick has been quoted as saying, “People already knew Rick The Manager so why change my name.”

In 2009, Rick assisted in the transformation of “Humble Bob” Shoudt to his bad boy image of Notorious B.O.B.. Rick is credited with the design and fabrication of the now infamous B.O.B. Bling Bling.

In late 2011, Rick was instrumental in bringing Stephanie “Chilita” Torres to Philadelphia and introducing her to W.I.P. and Wing Bowl.

Today, to some capacity, Rick still manages Notorious B.O.B. and Chilita, primarily at their east coast contests. Also, many well-known nationally ranked competitive eaters from all over the U.S., contact Rick The Manager on a regular basis seeking advice and ideas to enhance their eating personas.

== Competitive eating ==
Rick has eaten in four consecutive Wing Bowl competitions in Philadelphia from 2009 through 2012. To qualify for each of the Wing Bowls, Rick is credited with some of the most outrageous eating stunts in the 20 years of Wing Bowl by eating off of the bodies of several scantily clad beautiful women. In 2010, when Wing Bowl 18 was deemed all amateur, Rick The Manager organized and presented the most powerful entourage in competitive eating history. This entourage, dubbed "The Outlawed Eaters Tour" consisted mainly of world ranked professional competitive eaters including Joey Chestnut, Bob Shoudt, Patrick Bertoletti, Eric Booker, Micah "Wing Kong" Collins, Crazy Legs Conti, Dave "US Male" Goldstein, Eric "Steakbellie" Livingston, "Big" Brian Subich, "Gentleman Jerry" Coughlan, and Jeff "The Natural" Olson.

In 2009, Rick competed in the World Funnel Cake Eating Championship, an International Federation of Competitive Eating and Major League Eating sanctioned event at King's Dominion in Virginia.

In the summer of 2012, Rick The Manager competed in All Pro Eating's National Hamburger Eating Contest in Hamburg, Pennsylvania, finishing 8th overall.

Rick The Manager may be the only amateur eater in the world to have competed against Joey Chestnut, Takeru Kobayashi, Patrick Bertoletti, Bob Shoudt, Sonya Thomas, and Eric Booker.

For 15 consecutive years, Rick has maintained championship status at the Russo Family Thanksgiving dinner table. Even after a close call in 1999, when a tie ensued between Rick and his Uncle Tom, Rick won in a two-minute overtime.

== Film and television appearances ==
In 2003, Rick appeared in MTV's Viva La Bam television series as Rick The Driver along with close friend Jimmy Pop from the Bloodhound Gang.

In 2009, Rick appeared as himself in the reality show Cake Boss and an independent movie entitled Nacho Mountain.

In 2012, Rick appeared in a cheesesteak eating contest on the PBS series Globe Trekker in the Mid-Atlantic States, USA episode.

In late 2012, Rick was in the film, Silver Linings Playbook and on a question in the game show Who Wants to Be a Millionaire where Meredith Vieira makes reference to Rick's infamous two-toned goatee.

Rick has also been in local and national television commercials. Rick has also appeared in Beautifulbrians stuttering interviews in 2011 which can be seen on YouTube

== Launch of musical venture ==
In late 2012, Rick The Manager will release his debut single and video for his song, "Wing Bowl Anthem." The song's release will correspond with the 2013 Philadelphia Wing Bowl season. Rick credits Badlands Booker for his inspiration to sing about food. Badlands sang the original Rick The Manager theme song. Rick may be the only amateur competitive eater with a song written about him.
