= L.A. Beast =

American competitive eater and YouTuber (born 1984)

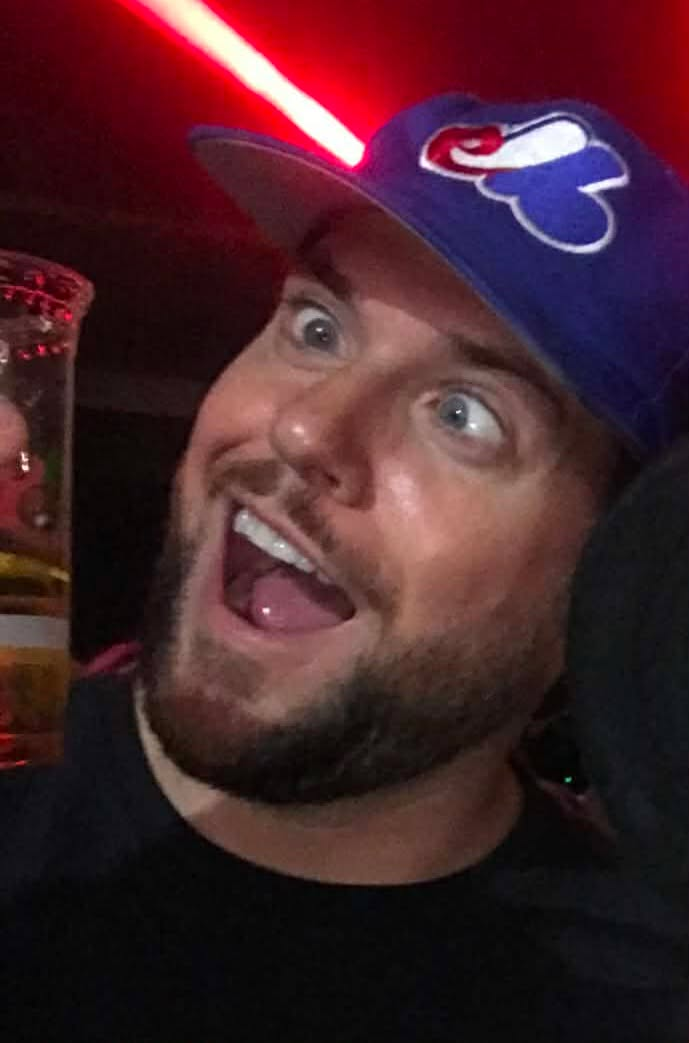
- Strahle in 2021
- Born: Kevin Thomas Strahle; January 6, 1984 (age 42); Ridgewood, New Jersey, U.S.
- Other names: L.A. Beast; KevLAbeast; labeast62; skippy62able
- Children: 1

YouTube information
- Channel: LABEAST
- Years active: 2010–present
- Genres: Competitive eating; extreme challenges; comedy; vlogging
- Subscribers: 3.39 million
- Views: 585 million
- Last updated: August 23, 2026

Kevin Thomas Strahle (born January 6, 1984), better known as the L.A. Beast, is an American professional competitive eater and YouTuber who hosts a challenge-based channel on YouTube. Strahle started making videos in his hometown of Ridgewood, New Jersey, before moving to Los Angeles, California. After several years at his home in California, he moved back to his hometown of Ridgewood. As of 2026, his channel has over three million subscribers & over 500 million total views. In addition to his online presence, he has made appearances on The Tonight Show with Jay Leno, The Today Show Australia and Tosh.0.

In 2015, Strahle led a successful campaign to bring back the soft drink Crystal Pepsi. His accomplishments also include earning 12 Guinness World Records, seven of which he still holds as of September 2026.

== Early life ==
Kevin Thomas Strahle was born on January 6, 1984, and grew up in Ridgewood, New Jersey.

As a child, Strahle developed a love for eating and later used his natural bulk to join the football team at Ridgewood High School. In his free time he would often accept money from his classmates to complete outrageous food challenges. Strahle is of Italian and Irish ancestry on his maternal side and German and Irish on his paternal side.

After high school, Strahle was recruited to play football for the Fordham Rams of Fordham University in New York. In his four years on the team, he started on the offensive line in almost every game for the 2004–2006 seasons.

In 2008, Strahle moved to Los Angeles and obtained a job working for Pepsi. After two years, he quit after a manager told him he was not "persistent enough" to be a salesman within PepsiCo. That criticism would later drive him to spearhead the 'Bring Back Crystal Pepsi' campaign.

== Internet videos ==
While Strahle was in Los Angeles, he uploaded his first YouTube video where he performed a milk chugging challenge. Noticing the positive response the video received, he started his own channel under the user name "skippy62able" on August 7, 2010. Having completed Fatburger's XXXL burger challenge, Strahle's roommate commented that he was 'a beast' for finishing it so fast. Starting in 2011, Strahle would often refer to himself as either "Beast" or "L.A. Beast", eventually choosing the latter as his official nickname.

In September 2015, Strahle and fellow eaters Takeru Kobayashi, Bob Shoudt, Patrick Bertoletti and Tim Brown assembled in Chicago, Illinois to consume an entire cooked goat. This eating challenge was performed with the intention of lifting the infamous Chicago Cubs curse. The Cubs would go on to win the World Series the following year.

L.A. Beast's YouTube channel features dozens of videos in which he films himself performing a variety of over-the-top eating and drinking challenges. In some cases when he is unsuccessful at these challenges, the featured entertainment value is the schadenfreude and gross-out humor of him experiencing pain and vomiting copious amounts of food and drink. His comedic approach also includes outlandish but extremely specific descriptions of what the experience of eating or drinking these substances is like. In addition, Strahle has a number of humorous catchphrases and frequently used terms, and he usually edits his videos to include picture-in-picture visual puns and other images to accompany the sayings, such as a map of the Bering Strait (or a photo of machine bearings) when he says "I need to get my bearings straight," or amusing photos of animals such as seals that appear as if they are making the vocalizations that L.A. Beast makes as he dry-heaves and retches.

== Competitive eating ==
In November 2011, Strahle competed in his first professional eating contest at the Wild Turkey 81 Eating World Championship in New York City.

In 2012, Strahle was ranked the 16th best competitive eater in the world, and ranked 17th in 2013.

In June 2012, Strahle consumed 25 hot dogs in 10 minutes at the Nathan's Hot Dog Eating Contest qualifier in Cleveland, Ohio. Though Strahle lost to eating veteran Crazy Legs Conti, he was beaten by only a quarter of a hot dog.

In February 2016, Strahle competed at Wing Bowl 24 where he ate a cactus live on stage. To qualify for the competition, Strahle ate 24 raw eggs in under four minutes.

On May 3, 2017, Strahle broke the Guinness World Record for the most chicken nuggets eaten in 3 minutes by consuming 642.12 grams (22.650 oz) of chicken nuggets beating the previous record of 531 g (18.7 oz).

Later that morning, Strahle also broke the Guinness World Record for the most bhut jolokia peppers eaten in 2 minutes by consuming 121.9 grams (4.30 oz) of peppers, beating the previous record of 66 grams (2.3 oz).

On May 12, 2017, Strahle broke two additional Guinness World Records for both the most powdered doughnuts eaten in 3 minutes, and the record for fastest time to drink a 32-ounce bottle (0.95 L) of pure maple syrup. The previous record for most powdered doughnuts eaten in 3 minutes was 6 doughnuts, set by Shamus Petherick of Australia. It was beaten when Strahle managed to consume 9 whole doughnuts in the same amount of time. For the second record, Strahle drank 32 US fluid ounces (0.95 L) of pure maple syrup in 10.84 seconds, beating the former record of 26 seconds.

In September 2018, Strahle entered a competition at Jimmy Geez in Haledon, New Jersey, in which he ate 40 nuclear wings. Strahle completed the challenge in a span of 57 minutes and 22 seconds.

== "Bring Back Crystal Pepsi" movement ==
In April 2015, Strahle rallied his fans to comment on Pepsi's official social media accounts with the hashtag "#BringBackCrystalPEPSI" in an effort to revive the once-popular soft drink. This led to the creation of a Change.org petition and as of August 2016, it has over 34,000 signatures. The popularity of the movement also produced 15 billboards placed all around the Los Angeles area.

On June 8, 2015, Strahle received a message from Pepsi via Twitter, acknowledging his efforts to get Crystal Pepsi brought back to store shelves and hinting at the soft drink's potential return. The next day, a Pepsi spokeswoman confirmed the message's authenticity.

On July 26, 2015, Strahle released a song on iTunes called "The Crystal Pepsi Song" featuring production company That's Classic Media (now named Mac N’ Cheese Media). A music video was later released on August 5, 2015.

On December 8, 2015, Pepsi announced the re-release of Crystal Pepsi in a limited quantity sweepstakes. In June 2016, Pepsi announced that Crystal Pepsi would be released in the U.S. on August 8, 2016, for an eight-week run.

== Other ventures ==
In February 2025, Strahle was announced to be one of the boxers in iDubbbz's Creator Clash 3, going up against Harley Morenstein. Morenstein dropped out of the event in April, and a month later in May, Strahle left the event, citing "multiple red flags and irreversible damage it can do to one’s brand by being associated with the event."

== Notable challenges ==
=== Eating ===
- Two cacti
- The entire menu of burgers from the Burger King menu while wearing a shock collar
- A 5-pound bag (2.3 kg) of Haribo sugarless gummy bears
- Two jars of Vegemite
- An entire watermelon, including the rind
- 2 Chocolate Bhutlah Peppers
- 21 dimes covered in olive oil
- A 72-ounce steak meal in less than an hour
- A cluster of bananas and drinking two liters of Sprite
- An entire pineapple
- Two wooden pencils
- 27 ghost peppers, including a video from 2011.
- 110 McDonald's Chicken Nuggets
- 5 light bulbs in under 10 minutes
- 60 Reese's Peanut Butter Cups
- A cupful of sand

=== Drinking ===
- Drinking a 20-year-old bottle of Crystal Pepsi
- A gallon of honey while covered with bees
- A whole bottle of Syrup of ipecac
- A mixture of milk and Red Bull from a 3-liter beer glass
- Two liters of Sprite after consuming 18 bananas
- Drinking a whole Mega Gulp iced drink as fast as possible, afterwards trying to cross a butter-covered floor with an armful of presents, then suffering from a compound fracture of one of his toes after falling and hitting a fridge
- A gallon of Habanero Tabasco sauce
- Approximately 3 pounds of Sriracha
- An entire bottle of Cristal Champagne
- 24,000 calories worth of olive oil from a 3-liter beer glass
- 50 raw eggs in two and a half minutes
- 32 oz of chocolate milk through his nose
- One gallon of spoiled milk

=== Other stunts ===
- Inserting his hand into a jar full of hot ice (sodium acetate trihydrate) and burning his hand
- Placing his hands inside gloves filled with bullet ants for 10 minutes
- Solving a Rubik's Cube blindfolded while walking barefoot over a large pile of Lego bricks
- Inhaling various vaporized alcoholic beverages
- Ripping 30 phone books in half in 3 minutes
- Consecutively running through a door, ripping a phonebook in half, rolling up a frying pan, crushing 6 empty soda cans with his head, and jumping onto a 2x4 plank of wood groin first

=== World records ===
Strahle currently holds eight Guinness World Records:

- Most powdered doughnuts eaten in three minutes.
- Fastest time to drink a 32 oz. bottle of maple syrup.
- Fastest time to eat all chocolates from an advent calendar.
- Most peanut butter cups eaten in one minute.
- Most gummy bears eaten with a stick in one minute.
- Fastest time to drink two liters of soda through a straw.
- Farthest distance walked on Lego bricks barefoot with a relay team.
- Most ice lollies (popsicles) eaten in one minute.
- Fastest time to drink 6 beers through your nose

In the past, he has held the records for:

- Most chicken nuggets eaten in 3 minutes (642.12 grams). Beating the record previously held by Todd Fernley (531 grams) on February 26, 2016.
- Most Bhut jolokia chili peppers (Ghost Peppers) eaten in two minutes.
- Most marshmallows eaten in one minute (no hands).
- Fastest time to drink a cup of coffee.

== See also ==
- List of YouTubers
- List of competitive eaters
