= Major League Eating: The Game =

2008 video game

- Developer: Sensory Sweep Studios
- Publisher: Mastiff
- Platform: Wii (WiiWare)
- Release: NA: July 14, 2008; JP: March 24, 2009
- Genre: Action game
- Modes: Single-player, multiplayer

Major League Eating: The Game is a video game for WiiWare developed by Sensory Sweep Studios, and produced by Mastiff. The first video game to be based on competitive eating, it was released in North America on July 14, 2008, and in Japan on March 24, 2009.

== Gameplay ==
Based on competitive eating contests held by Major League Eating, the game features eleven competitive eating professionals to compete against including Takeru Kobayashi, Joey Chestnut, Tim Janus, Patrick Bertoletti, Crazy Legs Conti, Sonya Thomas, Rich LeFevre and Juliet Lee, as well as a Kodiak bear. The Japanese release replaces LeFevre and Lee with Japanese competitive eaters Noboyuki Shirota and Hatsuyo Sugawara.

Controlled using Wii Remote gestures and likened to a fighting game, Major League Eating: The Game allows players to unleash special moves on their opponents. Players progress through a number of increasingly difficult rounds that cover twelve different types of food. Along with the single-player campaign and a competitive two-player mode, the game also features online play and leaderboards.

The developers have cited Street Fighter II, Street Fighter Alpha and Mario Kart as influences on the game.

== Reception ==
WiiWare World gave the game a 6 out of 10, stating the game is a "unique blend of concepts wrapped around a somewhat distasteful premise and vulgar humour". They felt the gameplay was repetitive and that the use of power-ups during gameplay somewhat spoiled the core mechanic of the game, which they otherwise found to be "surprisingly fun". However IGN was more negative, giving the game a 3.5/10 and calling it "another clunky, ugly Wii game that consists of waving your arms around looking like a jackass".

Despite this, MTV Multiplayer said that players "might not want to write off Major League Eating: The Game too quickly. Sure, it's a game based entirely on eating, but it is actually surprisingly fun to virtually scarf down quantities of food so large that the average human body would most likely not be able to digest."
