= Carlene LeFevre =

American competitive eater

Carlene LeFevre (born c. 1943) is a competitive eater from Henderson, Nevada. She and her husband, Rich, were dubbed the "First Family of Competitive Eating" by George Shea, co-founder of Major League Eating. The couple has combined to take two of the top seven places in Nathan's Hot Dog Eating Contest in 2003, 2004, and 2005.

== Biography ==
LeFevre grew up in the San Francisco Bay Area and met her husband Rich at a square dancing club in Daly City, California. They married around 1974. She has worked as a substitute elementary school teacher, aerobics instructor at a Richard Simmons-affiliated gym, and a Mary Kay cosmetics saleswoman.

Her first notable gastronomic achievement was finishing a 72-ounce steak from the Big Texan steakhouse in Amarillo, Texas in 1985. The restaurant promised a free meal for anyone who could finish the steak in under an hour. She has bested the Big Texan's challenge on more than ten occasions since then, and one such event was filmed for the Ripley's Believe It Or Not television program in 2000. The LeFevres started entering eating contests the following year. Since then, they have competed in numerous competitions around the United States. LeFevre has also competed in a buffet contest in Japan. While she has placed high in many contests, the only contest she has won that was not a qualifying contest for Nathan's was a posole contest in New Mexico in November 2004, during which she ate 109.75 ounces (3,111 g) in 12 minutes. Her trademark technique is called the "Carlene Pop," in which she bounces up and down while eating to get the food to settle. She is called "The Madam of Etiquette" for her relative degree of decorum while consuming mass quantities of food quickly.

In addition to their appearance on Ripley's, the couple have also appeared on The Tonight Show, the Donny & Marie, a buffet contest on the Travel Channel, The View and Outlook on BBC. In February 2003, she was ranked 8th in the world, but fell to 9th by October. She announced in 2017 that the Fourth of July Nathan's Hot Dog Eating Contest was her final hot dog eating contest.

== See also ==
- List of competitive eaters
