= George Shea =

George Shea may refer to:

- George Shea (politician) (1851–1932), mayor of St. John's, Newfoundland
- George Beverly Shea (1909–2013), Canadian-born American gospel singer and hymn composer
- George D. Shea (1894–1971), United States Army general
- George Shea (Major League Eating), commissioner of Major League Eating
