= Zermatt Neo =

Singaporean competitive eater (born 1987)

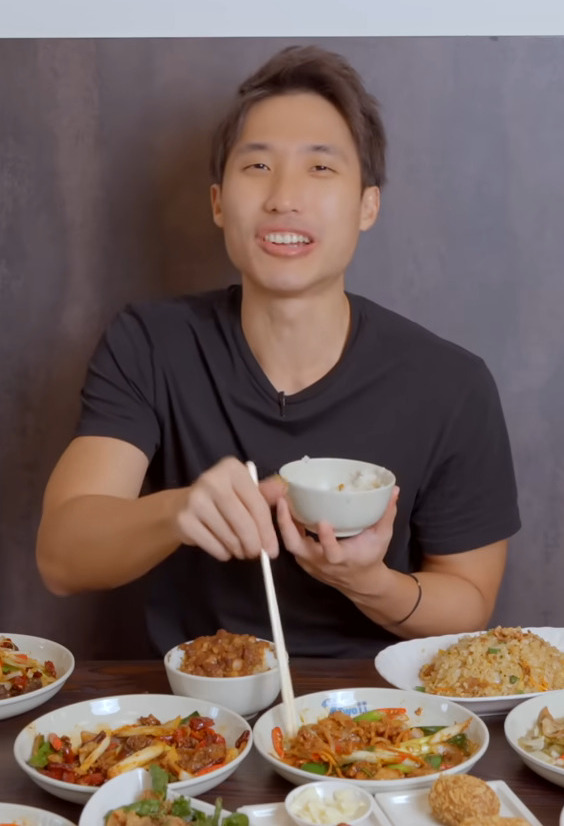
- Neo in 2022
- Born: 24 December 1987 (age 38); Singapore
- Occupations: Competitive eater; Content creator
- Years active: 2015–present

Chinese name
- Simplified Chinese: 梁照远
Transcriptions
Standard Mandarin
- Hanyu Pinyin: Liáng Zhàoyuǎn

Zermatt Neo (Note: simplified Chinese: 梁照远; traditional Chinese: 梁照遠; pinyin: Liáng Zhàoyuǎn) (born 24 December 1987) is a Singaporean competitive eater and content creator.

Previously a personal trainer and dietitian with a degree in nutrition, Neo quit to become a full-time content creator in 2018, citing a lack of time. He records competitive eating and mukbang videos.

Neo works out regularly to maintain fitness. He intermittently fasts before eating challenges and rests for a minimum of three days after, adopting a low-inflammation diet. In eating challenges, he prefers carbohydrates over proteins, opts for cooked food to avoid food poisoning, and prefers Asian and hawker cuisine.

== Early life ==
Zermatt Neo is a Singaporean who was born on 24 December 1987. His name is derived from the Swiss municipality, Zermatt. Before becoming a content creator, he was a personal trainer and dietitian. He has a degree in nutrition. Growing up, he was "a bit greedy" with food, but never thought of becoming a professional eater.

Neo found competitive eating an enjoyable weekend activity where he could eat food free-of-charge. He did hiking and kayaking, but only gained an interest in exercise after national service, after feeling that he "needed a change", and saying that it was addictive. He went to the gym about six days a week.

== Career ==
=== Competitive eating ===
After a dare in 2013 to do a wagyu hamburger-eating challenge from a gym friend and realising that he excelled at it, Neo started competitive eating. Neo is described as "Singapore's strongest competitive eater", according to Karen Tee of Channel NewsAsia.

In 2015, Neo began uploading videos on an ad hoc schedule, starting with a pizza-eating contest. He first gained fame in 2016, after eating close to 4 kg of chicken rice at a coffee shop in Bukit Batok in slightly over 29 minutes in a viral video. According to Neo, the video went viral because it was relatable and interesting how a competitive eater could remain in shape. In 2018, he started competitive eating and content creation full-time, quitting being a personal trainer and dietitian, due to a lack of time. He quoted one of the reasons being receiving offers to eat at restaurants while getting paid. It took several years to achieve financial stability as a content creator. He does food challenges and mukbang videos. He hopes to use cuisine to connect people internationally. As of 2023, he works in a team of around six with one intern, and a producer. As of 2023, Neo co-hosts Adventure Of The Day with Annette Lee, a food and travel show challenging the common Singaporean saying that "[there is] nothing to do in [the] country".

To keep fit, Neo works out six to seven days a week, such as doing cardio workouts and hiking. In the gym, he spends about 1.5 hours, with an hour dedicated to cardio. He also gets a health check-up every six months, of which the doctor says that he is "healthier than 90 per cent of Singaporeans." Before a competition, he practices intermittent fasting lasting up to and around 24 hours, banning water and food, eating blueberries, nuts, vegetables, eggs and tofu, accumulating a large caloric deficit.

Neo prepares for a competition with "speed, capacity and technique". He also believes that mental fortitude is equally as important. He also practices by simulating a contest to determine the best strategy to eat. According to Neo, his ambidexterity is a useful skill as it allows him to save crucial seconds alternating between food and other aids like water. He is able to eat about 8 to 9 kg of rice and noodles, but only about 6 to 7 kg of meat, finding protein-heavy food or processed food such as pizza more challenging to eat, preferring carbohydrates over proteins. In a challenge, Neo usually starts with meat as they are denser, and finds it easier to squeeze in carbohydrates even when he is struggling. He also prefers Asian and hawker cuisine during competitions. Neo opts for cooked food to minimise chances of food poisoning.

After an eating challenge, Neo does not suffer from acid reflux or vomiting, but only cramps. He does not induce vomiting on purpose. He allocates time for recovery, with a minimum of three days after a video shoot, and up to four days, going on a low-inflammation diet or eating vegan or vegetarian food, drinking ample amounts of water, and getting ample sleep. He also keeps track of his caloric intake and weighs himself every day to keep fit. He credits his experience as a dietitian and a personal trainer with helping him handle the after-effects.

He has done eating challenges in various countries, such as char siu with rice in Hong Kong, omurice in Japan, gyūdon in the Philippines, nasi kandar in Malaysia, and an eating challenge titled 来吃来吃大胃王 (Note: pinyin: lái chī lái chī dà wèi wáng) in China. He has also done eating challenges in Singapore, such as kaya toast in Singapore to commemorate the 58th anniversary of Singapore, and egg tarts at Joy Luck Teahouse in ION Orchard with another competitive eater, Raina Huang. He considers eating street food his niche for his YouTube channel and offers publicity to lesser known hawkers who may be struggling.

In 2017, Neo won the Food League Singapore championship, eating 92 chicken wings in 8 minutes. As of 2023, Neo considered eating 21 bowls of Blanco Court beef noodle at Singapore Comic Con in 15 minutes his most impressive achievement. It was a world record, and as of 2024, its video received over 1.5 million views. As of 2023, he considered eating 400 chicken wings at Jeffo's his hardest challenge. Neo says that competitive eating taught him discipline, in activities such as eating well and working out. Noticing that the best competitive eaters are in their 40s and 50s, he said in 2023 that he may need to pivot in the long-term and do more travel videos sampling different international cuisines.

Neo jokingly recommended against competitive eating, saying that "it's not fun". He considers eating 2 kg of food impressive for beginners. He ate too much burger "many years ago" from 2025, causing his stomach to expand and crush his pancreas. As a result, he suffered pancreatitis, spending three days in an emergency room and two weeks to recover. He was also hospitalised once for food poisoning due to not being accustomed to eating too many oysters.

=== Other ventures ===
On October 28, Neo opened his first restaurant named "Over" at Tras Street in partnership with The Wolfpack Investment Holdings, serving local comfort food, with collaborations with other Singaporean food and beverage shops on a rotation. It offered an eating challenge of 8 kg of food in an hour with a maximum of four participants, to which they will be recognised on a "Hall of Fame" if successful.

== Personal life ==
Neo is ambidextrous. He is single.

His competitive eating career affects his social life due to his diet, making it harder to eat with friends. His parents are supportive of his career, but worry that too much food may affect his health. As such, his mother buys him supplements.
