= Charles Hardy (eater) =

American competitive eater (c. 1966 – 2023)

Charles Hardy (c. 1966 – August 3, 2023), known as Hungry Charles Hardy, was an American competitive eater from Brooklyn, New York, United States. Hardy was a long-standing member of the International Federation of Competitive Eating. He retired from the sport in 2005 to become the IFOCE's commissioner. During the latter half of 2004, Hungry Charles displayed dominance in eating, placing second and third in major events throughout the USA. Hardy secured victory for six consecutive years in the Civil Service qualifier for the hot dog circuit and he maintains records in sushi, shrimp, and cabbage.

Hardy was a Nathan's American Hot Dog Eating Champion (personal best is 23.523 Nathan's hot dogs and buns in 12 minutes). He won the 2001 Matzo Ball Eating Contest by consuming 15.5 Matzo balls in 5 minutes and 25 seconds. He competed in Japan twice, eating 15 feet of sushi in one sitting. After disappointing performances in Coney Island, skeptics murmured that the elasticity was gone from the stomach of the one-time American Hot Dog Eating Champion. With his victory at the Hibernation Cup in Alaska, however, and his record-breaking efforts with shrimp (4.5 pounds in 12 minutes) and boiled cabbage (six and a half pounds in nine minutes), Hardy put an end to rumors. In March 2006, he made a special appearance on Beautifulbrian Corner.

Hardy supplanted Ed Krachie in the late 1990s as America's most recognized competitive eater and was a member of the Corrections Emergency Response Team (CERT) at Rikers Island.

Charles Hardy died from cancer on August 3, 2023, at the age of 57.

== World records ==
- Cabbage: 6 pounds, 9 ounces (2.97 kg) giant cabbage in 9 minutes
- Shrimp: 4 pounds, 9 ounces (2.06 kg) spot shrimp in 12 minutes
