= Schewe =

Schewe is a German surname and may refer to:

== People ==
- Christopher Thomas Schewe, aka Shoenice (born 1969), American comedian, competitive eater, and YouTuber
- Dieter Schewe (1924–2014), German jurist and officer
- Florian Schewe (born 1978), German film director and producer
- Georg Schewe (1909–1989), German officer with the Kriegsmarine
- Juri Schewe, German drummer with the band Panik
- Katarzyna Schewe-Radtke (born 1969), Polish race walker
- Marcelis Schewe (born 1969), Dutch cricketer
- Max Schewe (1896–1951), German painter and artist
