= Peter Dowdeswell =

British competitive eater

- Born: 29 July 1940 (age 85); London, England
- Occupation: Competitive eater
- Known for: Fastest drinking of a yard of ale

Peter Dowdeswell, born in London on 29 July 1940, is an English gourmand. He is among the most successful competitive eaters in the recorded history of the sport. During the period when the Guinness Book of World Records kept data, Dowdeswell held more speed records than any other person, including records for the drinking of ale and the eating of eggs (hard-boiled, soft-boiled, and raw) and Cheddar cheese.

Dowdeswell accomplished most of his feats for charity, he says, rather than for record-breaking or insatiable hunger. Dowdeswell raised over £4.2 million for charity through eating and is renowned for being the father of record breakers.

He has appeared on several shows, including: David Letterman, This Morning, Jon Richardson's: How to Survive the End of the World and others.

== World records ==
- Large sausage: 20 in 36 seconds
- The fastest drinking of a yard of ale: 4.9 seconds

== See also ==
- List of competitive eaters
