= Furious Pete =

Canadian bodybuilder, competitive eater, and YouTuber (born 1985)

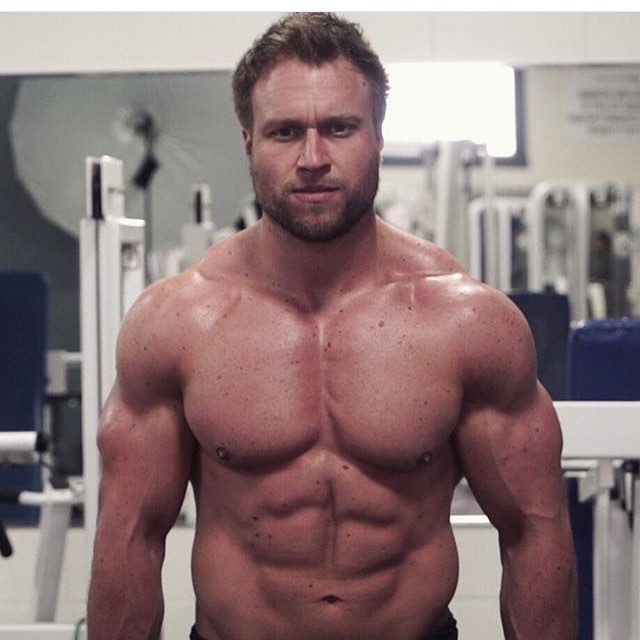
- Czerwinski in 2015
- Born: Piotr Czerwinski; November 30, 1985 (age 40); Toronto, Ontario, Canada
- Other name: Furious Pete
- Education: McMaster University
- Occupations: Competitive eater; Bodybuilder
- Height: 6 ft 2 in (1.88 m)

YouTube information
- Channel: Furious Pete
- Years active: 2006–present
- Genres: Speed eating; vlog
- Subscribers: 4.97 million
- Views: 1.06 billion
- Last updated: May 17, 2025

Peter Czerwinski (born Piotr Czerwinski; (Note: Birth name appears in video at approximately 4min 45sec "MY FIRST DAY OF CHEMOTHERAPY". YouTube.) November 30, 1985), better known by his stage name Furious Pete, is a Canadian competitive eater and YouTuber. Czerwinski currently holds fourteen Guinness World Records in eating.

== Early life and career ==
Peter Czerwinski was born on November 30, 1985, in Toronto. Both his parents had health issues. As a teenager, he suffered from anorexia nervosa, and was hospitalized for it at Toronto's Hospital for Sick Children. Bodybuilding was a major factor in his recovery.

Czerwinski has a slower digestion rate than the average person's. His daily diet comprises nine balanced meals and he exercises daily. Czerwinski became aware of his talent in eating after managing to beat an eating record. Thereafter, he decided to take on more eating-related challenges and post them on YouTube. Having participated in more than 90 eating competitions, Czerwinski holds fourteen Guinness World Records in competitive eating, including that for eating a whole raw onion in 43.53 seconds, seventeen bananas in 2 minutes, fifteen hamburgers in 10 minutes, 750 millilitres of olive oil in 60 seconds, and 17 Jaffa Cakes in sixty seconds. He also participated in season one of Canada's Got Talent. For his performance, he ate 5 hard boiled eggs, 3 pieces of Canadian bacon, 2 bananas, and a bag of milk in 51 seconds. However, he did not make it past the Toronto Auditions.

A direct-to-DVD documentary film, The Story of Furious Pete, chronicling Czerwinski's life, screened at the Hot Docs Canadian International Documentary Festival.

The Furious "Pete" – which consists of 20 pieces of bacon and 20 pieces of cheese, alongside a five-pound platter of fries – is named after him, after Czerwinski became the first person in 1,500 attempts to finish it.

== Health ==
Czerwinski suffered from testicular cancer twice, both times going into remission. On February 16, 2017, he uploaded a video onto YouTube where he stated he was battling testicular cancer for the third time. In January 2019, Czerwinski said that the testicular cancer had returned, and he had his second testicle surgically removed, requiring him to undergo testosterone replacement therapy for the rest of his life.

== See also ==
- List of competitive eaters
