= Rich LeFevre =

American competitive eater

Richard "Rich" LeFevre, nicknamed "The Locust", is a competitive eater and retired certified public accountant from Henderson, Nevada. Rich and his wife, Carlene LeFevre, are both accomplished members of the International Federation of Competitive Eating. The couple has combined to take two of the top seven places in Nathan's Hot Dog Eating Contest in 2003, 2004, and 2005. They live in Henderson Nevada in a home they call "The Pink Palace." He competed at Wing Bowl XIV in Philadelphia, Pennsylvania in which he placed second behind Joey Chestnut, another IFOCE champion.

== World records ==
- Pizza: 7½ extra large Bacci pizza slices in 15 minutes in Chicago on July 9, 2005
- Tex-Mex rolls: 30 rolls in 12 minutes at GameWorks at Great Lakes Crossing on March 12, 2005
- Huevos Rancheros: 7.75 lbs of Huevos Rancheros in 10 minutes on March 18, 2006.

== See also ==
- List of competitive eaters
