= Crazy Legs Conti =

American competitive eater

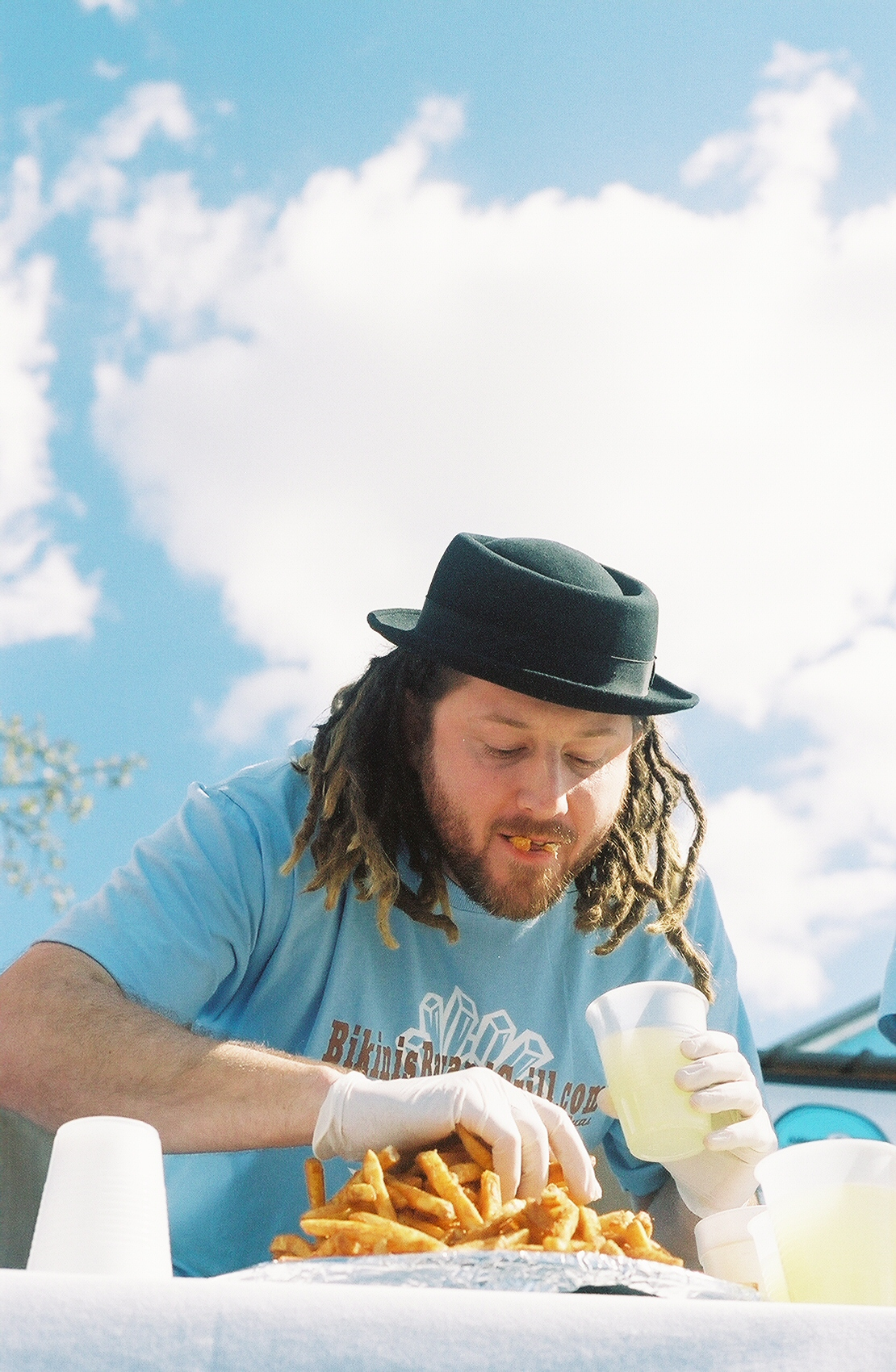
- Crazy Legs Conti at a 2007 french fry eating competition

Personal information
- Nickname: Crazy Legs
- Nationality: American
- Born: John Conti; 1974 (age 51–52) Belmont, Massachusetts
- Education: Johns Hopkins University

Sport
- Sport: Competitive eating

Crazy Legs Conti (formerly known as John Conti or Jason Conti, prior to a legal name change) is an American competitive eater. In 2011, he was ranked 21st in the world by the International Federation of Competitive Eating.

== Early life and education ==
Conti was raised in Belmont, Massachusetts. He attended Johns Hopkins University. He was a three-sport athlete for the Johns Hopkins Blue Jays, playing basketball, football ("third string punter"), and on the track team he competed in high jump ("but I never quite got high enough to qualify").

== Other careers ==
In addition to competitive eating, he has had a variety of jobs including purchasing agent for a steakhouse restaurant, screenwriter, bouncer, nude model, and window washer. Conti has appeared as a commentator for MLE Chowdown on Spike TV. He appeared once on the Discovery Channel's Cash Cab program with Tim Janus who won $1600 total by answering the bonus question.

== Competitive eating ==
Conti counts Eric Booker as an early inspiration to begin competitive eating. He won his first competition in New Orleans during Super Bowl weekend 2002 by eating over 400 oysters. He has held several world records, including the green bean and buffet food categories.

Conti trains by eating six hot dogs at a time as fast as possible and has studied video of Takeru Kobayashi in order to improve his technique. He also runs and goes to the gym three times a week to avoid gaining excess weight. This led him to compete in several marathons.

He claims that his motivation in competing is the joy of winning, rather than prize money. In addition to his successes, he is known to be magnanimous in defeat.

He is the subject of the 2004 competitive eating documentary film Crazy Legs Conti: Zen and the Art of Competitive Eating.

== Other endeavors ==
Conti and his fellow Johns Hopkins alumnus Chris Russell produced a short film, "Dearly Beloved", which won the Gold Award for Best Short Film Comedy-Adaptation at the Houston International Film Festival in 1997.

Conti has been involved in several other productions as assorted crew members; films include Mambo Café (2000) and The Bumblebee Flies Anyway (1999).

Conti appeared as an uncredited cameo in The Sopranos, in the episode "The Ride".

Conti's short film SOULFINGER vs GOLDFINGER screened at The Art of Brooklyn Film Festival in 2017.

== See also ==
- List of competitive eaters
