= Eat This Book =

2006 non-fiction book by Ryan Nerz

- First edition cover
- Author: Ryan Nerz
- Cover artist: Philip Pascuzzo
- Language: English
- Subject: Competitive eating
- Publisher: St. Martin's Press
- Publication date: April 2006
- Publication place: United States
- Media type: Print (Hardback & Paperback)
- Pages: ix, 308 pp
- ISBN: 0-312-33968-2
- OCLC: 62084428
- Dewey Decimal: 641.01/3 22
- LC Class: TX631 .N47 2006

Eat This Book is a book by Ryan Nerz which explores the world of competitive eating. Published by St. Martin's Press in 2006, Eat This Book provides a firsthand look into this sometimes controversial sport. Nerz, who spent a year as an emcee for the International Federation of Competitive Eating, has firsthand insight into the competitive eating phenomenon.

== Reviews ==
Because Nerz's book was released in the same month as Jason Fagone's Horsemen of the Esophagus, and since both books cover the sport of competitive eating, a number of published reviews covered both books together and drew comparisons between them.

The strongest criticism levelled at Eat This Book in reviews is that Nerz uses prose that is more sensational than objective. Booklist critiqued his book as "basically a book-length infomercial for the organization and its most famous athletes."

Despite this negative criticism, other reviewers found the direct involvement by Nerz, and first-hand account of his own personal quest to become a competitive participant both absorbing and entertaining. Jennings commends Nerz for presenting a broader cast of characters who participate in the sport, even though Nerz's book covers a narrower view of the sport than Fagone's Horsemen of the Esophagus. Nerz was able to provide increased coverage of the competitors as a result of emceeing many contests, and therefore obtaining direct access to many competitors that Fagone did not have. The book's breadth of coverage, both in terms of contests arranged neatly by chapter and in terms of the number of competitors, was also noted positively in other reviews.

The Publishers Weekly review of the book said that "Nerz chronicles his amusing adventures in the perverse, repellent, strangely heroic world of competitive eating…with glee and good humor." The New York Times Book Review compared the author’s style to that of Grantland Rice, an early 20th-century American sportswriter known for his elegant prose. Calling the author "more mythifier than journalist," the Times Book Review added that the competitive eaters he profiled "are indeed a colorful, varied bunch, even without the pro-wrestling-style personalities the IFOCE encourages."

Nerz appeared on The Daily Show with Jon Stewart on April 18, 2006, to discuss the book.
