= Crazy Legs Conti: Zen and the Art of Competitive Eating =

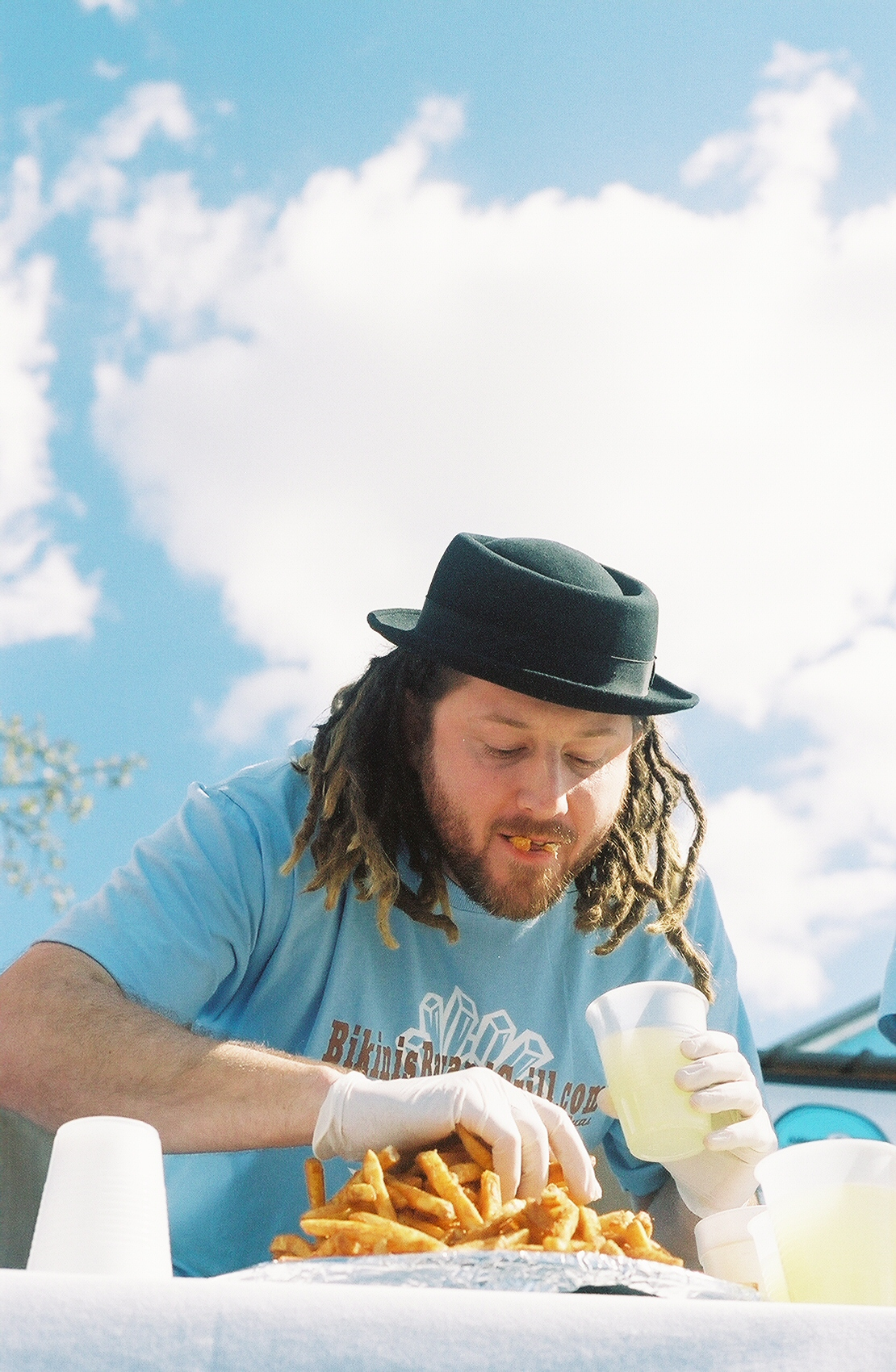
- Crazy Legs Conti at a 2007 french fry eating competition
- Directed by: Danielle Franco; Christopher Kenneally
- Produced by: Danielle Franco; Christopher Kenneally
- Edited by: Marc Senter
- Release date: June 19, 2004
- Running time: 75 minutes
- Country: United States
- Language: English

Crazy Legs Conti: Zen And The Art Of Competitive Eating is a 2004 documentary film portraying the culture of competitive eating. It was directed by Danielle Franco and Christopher Kenneally.

The film follows Jason "Crazy Legs" Conti, an eccentric New York window washer, nude model and sperm donor. He begins as a huge fan of the annual July 4 hot dog eating competition, but then casually breaks the world oyster eating record in New Orleans. He proceeds to dedicate himself to fulfilling his lifelong dream of becoming a professional competitive eater.
