= Yankee Doodle Coffee Shop =

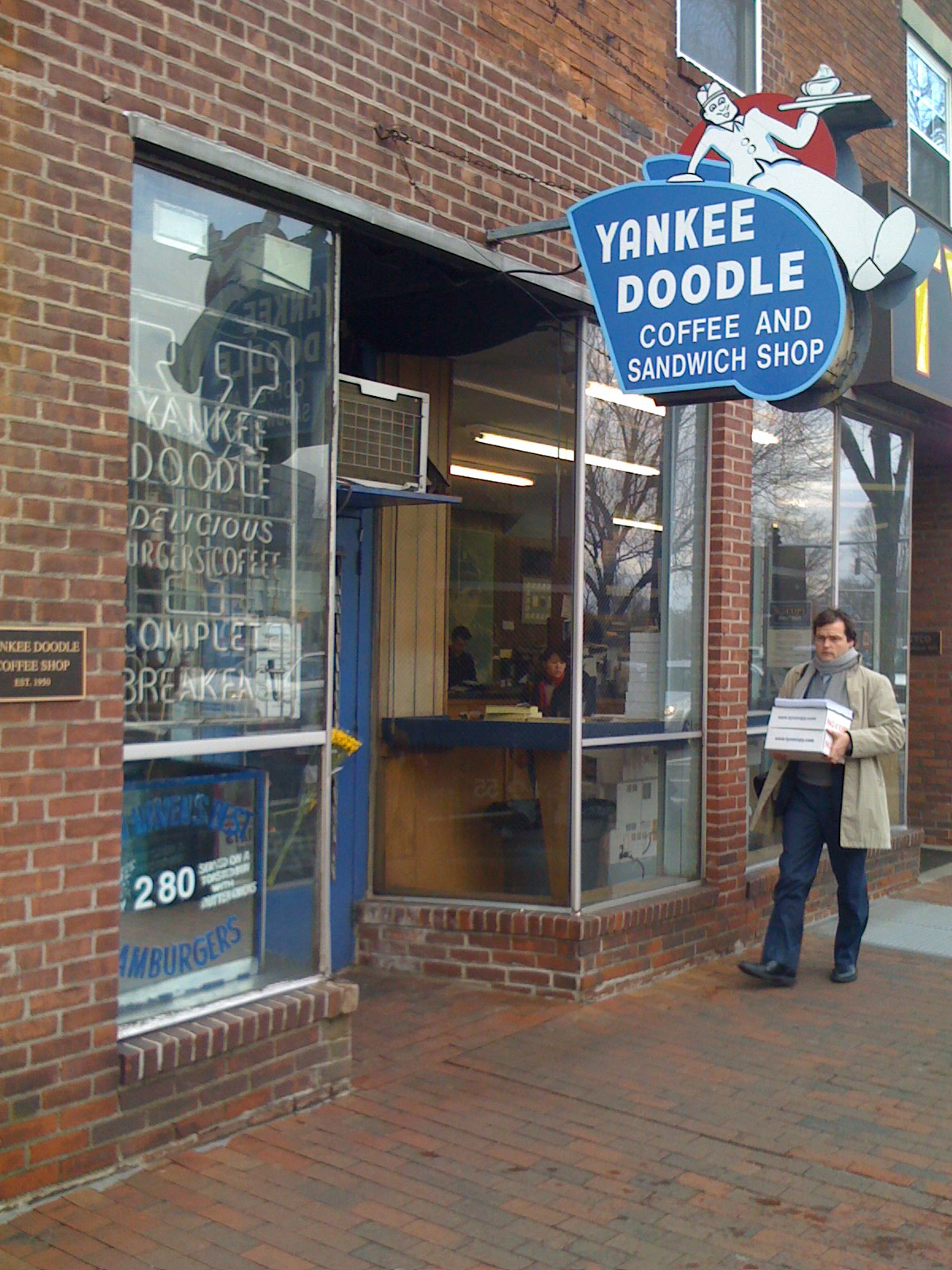
- A New Haven landmark brass plaque adorns the Yankee Doodle storefront on Broadway Avenue
- Interactive map of Yankee Doodle Coffee Shop

Restaurant information
- Established: April 15, 1950
- Closed: January 28, 2008
- Owner: Beckwith family
- Food type: diner
- Dress code: Casual
- Location: 258 Elm Street, New Haven, Connecticut, 06511, United States
- Coordinates: 41°18′41″N 72°55′51″W
- Seating capacity: Currently closed

The Yankee Doodle Coffee Shop, also known as The Doodle, was a diner in New Haven, Connecticut that catered to the Yale University community for 58 years before closing on January 28, 2008. The narrow restaurant, with only 12 stools arranged opposite a counter that ran the length of shop, was a favorite among students, faculty, and employees of the university. Bill Clinton, George W. Bush, and Henry Winkler are said to have been regulars during their times at Yale. The Doodle was known for its cheap but excellent food, especially the fried donut—an old fashioned donut cut down the middle, buttered, fried on the grill, and then re-buttered before serving. Other unique items popular with students included; the Bacon Egg and Cheese "No Break," The Doodle Dandy, and a variety of grilled muffins.

== History ==
Lew Beckwith Sr. opened the Doodle on the corner of Elm and York Streets on April 15, 1950, selling hamburgers for 20¢ each, cheeseburgers for 25¢, and "pigs in a blanket" (hot dogs stuffed with American cheese and wrapped in bacon) for 30¢. Breakfast of two eggs, toast, juice, and coffee cost just 50¢. As the shop had no space for a deep fryer, French fries were not on the menu. The restaurant was named after the tune Lew's father had sung to him as a boy.

Other than the prices, the menu and the diner itself changed little in the intervening years. It closed with its original cash register still in use (which only could ring-up up to $2.00), and there was still a cigarette machine in the corner. It hadn't actually been stocked in years, but it was installed on November 22, 1963, the day of the Kennedy assassination, so the Doodle kept it.

Ownership of the Doodle passed from Lew Beckwith to his son, Lew Beckwith Jr., and finally to grandson Rick Beckwith in 2000.

=== Closing of the restaurant ===
In 2008, citing economic considerations, Beckwith decided to close the Doodle. The New York Times quoted alumnus Jonathan Zittrain, a professor at Oxford University, as saying, "It’s one of the few dynastic successions that I had hoped would never end". Vice president of the University, Bruce Alexander, said, "If they had been in one of [Yale's] properties, we would have made every effort to keep the business going so future generations of Yale students could enjoy the same pigs in blankets we did".

Soon after the news got out, alumni and students began a movement to reopen the business. A group of alumni began soliciting donations online through Facebook groups, and owner Rick Beckwith solicited donations via a website which offered various Doodle-branded merchandise for sale. This effort raised thousands of dollars via donations and merchandise sales.

=== Controversy over donated money and merchandise orders ===
The restaurant has remained closed since January 2008, but the Doodle website has continued advertising Doodle-related merchandise for sale and soliciting donations.

In August 2008, articles appeared in the Yale Daily News and the New Haven Register, reporting that Yale alumni and members of the community who had ordered Doodle merchandise via Rick Beckwith's web site were unhappy that the merchandise they paid for was not delivered. According to the Yale Alumni Magazine, Beckwith apologized, saying that he would "reship any missing items 'in a timely manner' and send refunds if nothing is left in stock."

== Doodle Challenge ==
The Doodle Challenge was an eating contest to see how many burgers could be eaten in 2.5 hours. The Challenge was not a scheduled event; rather, a person might walk into the Doodle at any time and attempt the Challenge. If a new record was set, the burgers were free, and the eater's name was added to a plaque above the door. The Challenge started in 1989 when Ed Anderson, a Yale University undergraduate, ate 10 burgers. The last Yale student to hold the record was John Bockstoce with 26 burgers. As of July 2006, the title was held by Tim "Eater X" Janus, an internationally ranked competitive eater, who ate 34 burgers on May 25, 2006.
