= Tim Janus =

American competitive eater and reality show contestant (1976–2026)

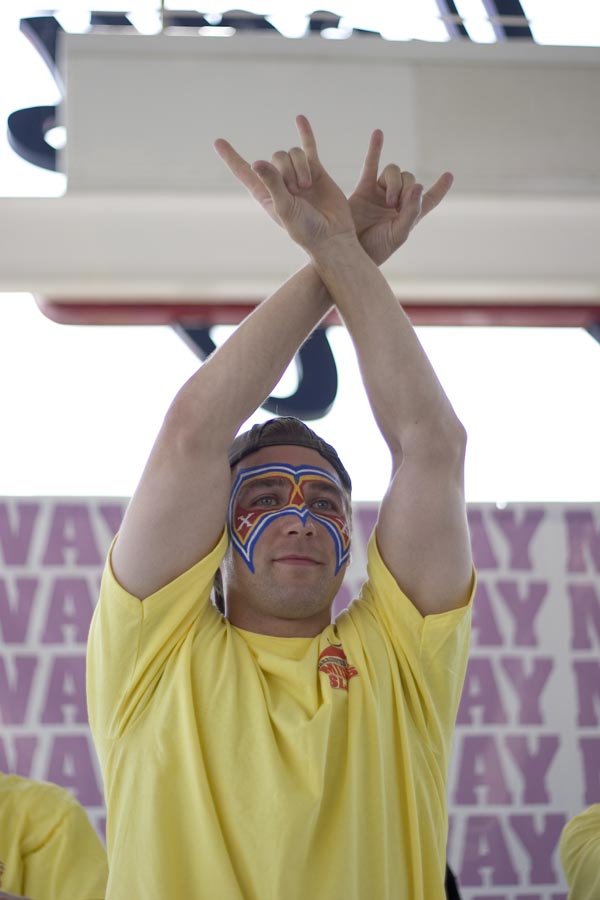
- Eater X in his classic pose at the 2005 Midway Slots Crabcake Eating Competition
- Born: December 31, 1976; Farmington, Connecticut, U.S.
- Died: September 16, 2026 (aged 49); Boston, Massachusetts, U.S.
- Occupations: Entertainer, media personality
- Known for: Professional eater, contestant on The Amazing Race

Timothy Peter Janus (December 31, 1976 – September 16, 2026) was an American entertainer, media personality and competitive eater known in the competitive eating community as "Eater X". He was a member of the International Federation of Competitive Eating (IFOCE). Janus performed in contests wearing a painted mask and once stated, "I'd eat anything. One of my goals in life is to eat everything in the world at least once. I'd eat a roll of pennies if I thought I could set a world record. Some day I hope we make contact with beings from other planets. I'd love to eat alien."

== Early life and education ==
Janus was born in Farmington, Connecticut, on December 31, 1976 to Peter Janus, a labor attorney, and Lucinda Hannon, a social worker. He had one sister. Janus attended Simsbury High School and graduated from Southern Methodist University in 1999 with a degree in political science and public policy in 1999.

== Career ==
Janus was working as a day trader in New York City, when he discovered competitive eating as a stress-reducing activity. He began to pursue the sport seriously, earning the 2004 Rookie of the Year from the International Federation of Competitive Eating. In 2005, Janus advanced to the Final Four of the inaugural Alka Seltzer U.S. Open of Competitive Eating, a single-elimination tournament featuring 32 of the world's best eaters. In the ensuing three years, he set world records for tiramisu (2005), ramen noodles (2007), and nigiri sushi (2008).

Following his success in several major competitions, Janus received coverage on several television shows. In 2006, he was featured on the show "True Life: I'm a Competitive Eater" along with then world-champion hot-dog eater Takeru Kobayashi. The show showcased his daily life, including his training for different events. In 2007, Janus was a test subject in a documentary, The Science of Speed Eating from National Geographic. He underwent an upper gastrointestinal series and was shown to have a stomach that expands four times larger than a normal stomach. Janus's digestive rate of the stomach was also slower than a normal human.

On September 22, 2007, Janus ate 10¾ 18-ounce burritos (made of rice, black beans, pork, cheese and a mild sauce wrapped in a tortilla) in 12 minutes to win the $3,000 Costa Vida world burrito-eating championship. Later that year, he helped draw attention to the plight of New York City's hungry by consuming a Thanksgiving meal for four, including a 10-pound turkey, four pounds of mashed potatoes, three pounds of cranberry sauce, 2½ pounds of beans, and a pumpkin pie. The IFOCE donated $10,000 to Food Bank for New York City, a hunger-relief organization, to celebrate the accomplishment. It was estimated that the donation would provide 30,000 meals to area residents.

On May 16, 2009, Janus became the third person in the history of the world to eat 50 or more hot dogs and buns in a Nathan's Hot Dog Eating Contest, consuming exactly 50 in his qualifier in Hartford, Connecticut. In the finals on July 4, Janus ate 53 hot dogs. On July 4, 2010, Eater X placed second at the Nathan's Hot Dog Eating Contest by eating 45 hot dogs and losing to Joey Chestnut who ate 54 hot dogs and buns. In an August 24, 2010, episode of Shaq Vs. on ABC, Janus coached a team led by Shaquille O'Neal to victory in a hot dog eating contest against Joey Chestnut.

Janus was the champion of the Doodle Challenge, a hamburger eating contest in Connecticut. On October 13, 2012, Janus tied for second place with Bob Shoudt in the World Poutine Eating Championship, after eating 8.5 lbs of poutine (or 17 boxes) in 10 minutes.

Janus announced his retirement from competitive eating on July 3, 2016 via Twitter. Janus said that "I've wondered how long-term stupid competing is for my health. I can't ignore that feeling anymore."

== Game show appearances ==
Janus appeared on the syndicated version of Who Wants to Be a Millionaire in 2009, winning $100,000 before choosing to walk away, although he had surmised the correct answer to the $250,000 question. Millionaire at the time had an event called the Million Dollar Tournament of 10 where the 10 highest earning contestants from the season's first 45 shows would return for a chance to answer a million dollar question, and Janus qualified as the fifth seed for the Million Dollar Prize. He returned on November 16 to answer his Million Dollar Question. He also won $1600 on the Discovery Channel show Cash Cab with Ben Bailey.

== Other media appearances ==
Janus appears as a character in Major League Eating: The Game, available on WiiWare and iTunes. He appeared in the music video for the Boston Spaceships song "Let it Rest for a Little While" from the band's 2009 album Zero to 99.

On June 8, 2012, in New York City, Janus was crowned World Burping Champion by the World Burping Federation after he produced a single, continuous burp lasting 18.1 seconds. Later that summer, Janus appeared on The Tonight Show with Jay Leno to burp for William Shatner. On August 28, 2013, Deadspin released a video of Janus's attempt to become, in his words, "the first person in the history of the world to get legally drunk (.08) on" non-alcoholic beer. In the video, Janus drinks 28 cans and bottles of various non-alcoholic beers and then blows into a breathalyzer. A .02 reading is recorded, leading Janus to conclude that if he cannot get drunk on O'Doul's, nobody can.

In 2014, Janus began delivering weather reports when visiting local TV stations to promote contests in which he was competing. On February 8 in Orlando, Florida, Janus provided the weather report on FOX 35's morning news broadcast. On March 28, on a visit to WPMI in Mobile, Alabama, he again provided the weather forecast. Janus also had a small acting role on Showtime's Billions, playing a hedge fund trader named Jones in 2016. That same year, Janus appeared on The Eric Andre Show. On December 7, 2017, it was announced that Janus and Joey Chestnut would be competing on the 30th season of The Amazing Race.

== Death ==
Janus was diagnosed with lung cancer in 2023, prompting him to leave his job as a Foreign Service officer in Mexico City. He died from the disease in Boston, Massachusetts, on September 16, 2026, at the age of 49.

== Records ==
Records set by Janus, as recognized by Major League Eating, include:

- Tiramisu: 4 pounds in 6 minutes, March 5, 2005
- Cannoli: 26 in 6 minutes (tied), September 15, 2006
- Tamales: 71 in 12 minutes, September 1, 2007
- Burritos: 11.81 pounds in 10 minutes, September 22, 2007
- Ramen: 10.5 pounds in 8 minutes, October 27, 2007
- Pork rinds: 14.3 ounces in 6 minutes, January 31, 2008
- Nigiri sushi: 141 pieces in 6 minutes, April 11, 2008
- Boneless Buffalo wings: 7.72 pounds in 12 minutes, May 8, 2010
- Chili: 2 gallons in 6 minutes (tied), October 7, 2012

== See also ==
- List of competitive eaters
