= George Shea (Major League Eating) =

Co-founder of Major League Eating

Personal information
- Nationality: American
- Born: George Shea; 1964 (age 61–62) Boston, Massachusetts
- Education: Columbia University
- Occupation: Major League Eating Co-Founder

George Shea is a cofounder of both Shea Communications, a New York City-based public relations firm, and of Major League Eating. He hosts MLE's main eating competition, Nathan's Hot Dog Eating Contest. Shea now hosts many different live events, including NASCAR, boxing matches, casino openings, corporate gatherings and keynote addresses. He is known for wearing his signature straw hat to all events, including the Nathan's hot dog competitions.

== Early life and career ==
George Shea was raised in Maine. He has four other siblings.

Shea graduated from Columbia University in 1986 as an English major. He entered the public relations field soon after, working for the dean of New York City PR, Mortimer Matz, representing elected officials, real estate clients and municipal unions. He described his early public relations work in New York City as "stunt PR", and it was what first introduced him to the Nathan's Hot Dog eating contest in Coney Island. He first attended the competition in 1988 and served as a judge.

In 1991, Shea took over the Coney Island hot dog eating contest. He originally had the role of a press agent and was tasked with promoting the event. Back in the '90s, Nathan's Hot Dog Eating Contest was reportedly small and only had a few dozen spectators. Shea became the driving force for promoting the event by creating wild introductions for the eaters.

In 1997, Shea created a media agency, Shea Communications. It specializes in real estate, events, and consumer-facing clients. His brother, Rich, is a partner in the company.

Shea is represented by TCAA agency for public appearances.

== Major League Eating ==
In 1997, Shea officially founded International Federation of Competitive Eating and Major League Eating with his younger brother, Rich. It allowed him to bring competitive eating to different states and countries after gaining experience hosting the hot dog contest. Today, Major League Eating hosts around 80 competitions every year. Nathan's Hot Dog Eating Contest is the league's biggest competition.

After 1991, Shea continued the Master of ceremonies for the Coney Island competition. According to Shea, he writes about 20-30 pages of a script more than a month before the Hot Dog Eating Contest. However, he does not memorize this entire script and mainly uses it for direction. As emcee, he has become known for his dramatic introductions as each of the competitive eaters take the stage. The Ringer (website) ranked his best introductions, labeling his 2015 speech welcoming Joey Chestnut on stage as number one: "In a world of nothing. Of barren hills and cracked earth and once-proud oceans drained to sand, there will still be a monument to our existence. Bleached by the sun, perhaps, and blunted by time, but everlasting. Because this man represents all that is eternal in the human experience. … Through the curtain of the aurora, a comet blazes to herald his arrival, and his victory shall be transcribed into every language known to history, including Klingon. The Bratwurst, and Pierogi, and Hooters Chicken Wing eating champion of the world, eight-time Nathan’s Famous Hot Dog Eating champion of the world, the no. 1 eater in the world, I give you America itself, Joey Chestnut."

His carnival-barker-like on-stage character is just one way he has added personality to the event to generate publicity. For example, he created the Belt of fat theory and wrote a scientific paper regarding the subject. The paper was denied by The New England Journal of Medicine, but Shea says it put more eyes on competitive eating. Shea also created the "Mustard Belt", a championship, weightlifter's belt colored mustard yellow that was gifted to the champion. He amplified the rivalry between the United States and Japan in the competitive eating sphere. Shea also made the decision to begin referring to competitive eaters as athletes. To make the competitions more official, Shea made the decision in 2011 to create co-ed divisions. Shea did this to "conform to International Olympic Committee standards." Today, over 2 million people are estimated to watch the event as it airs on ESPN. It is estimated that around 35,000 people come to Coney Island to see the competition live.

Shea continues to host the Nathan's Hot Dog Eating Contest and has turned to social media to publicize eating competitions. Major League Eating has contracted competitors that have found success on YouTube, such as Matt Stonie, to bring eyes to the concept of competitive eating and eating challenges. Shea says Major League Eating coordinated a video where Eric Booker ate three live octopuses. Shea receives numerous requests for personalized video introductions in the style of those he delivers for Joey Chestnut and he now offers those via Cameo

== Controversy ==
When it relates to lighthearted topics such as competitive eating, Shea takes on the persona of a promoter and believes that any press is good press. The Washington Post even compared Shea to Donald Trump, writing, "Carman argues neither Shea nor Trump “[seem] to care much whether his words have a toehold in reality. To them, the victory is everything."

Shea and his brother have executed a host of different stunts related to the contest to generate buzz. In 2007, they promoted the fact that champion Takeru Kobayashi had "jawthritus" and was listed as "day-to-day," possibly unable to compete.

=== Ban of Joey Chestnut ===
In 2024, Shea announced that 16-time hot dog winner Joey Chestnut could no longer compete in the competition after he signed a deal with a competitor hot dog company rather than Nathan's. Shea did not mention the specific brand, but Chestnut was representing Impossible Foods, and that this was not allowed within the competition. Shea said if the contract dispute was resolved, he would be welcome to join the competition again, stating, "We love him. The fans love him. He made the choice."

However, Chestnut pushed back on this claim, stating on social media, “I do not have a contract with MLE or Nathans and they are looking to change the rules from past years as it relates to other partners I can work with.” Having previously continued to compete in MLE competitions, including the St. Elmo’s World Famous Shrimp Cocktail Eating Championship, Chestnut was allowed to enter the competition again in 2025, which he won.

== Personal life ==
George Shea currently lives in Brooklyn and is a fan of the Brooklyn Nets.
