= Raina Huang =

American competitive eater (born 1994)

- Born: October 20, 1994 (age 32); Los Angeles County, California, U.S.
- Education: University of California, Riverside (dropped out)
- Occupations: Competitive eater; Internet celebrity

Instagram information
- Page: rainaiscrazy
- Years active: 2018–present
- Followers: 1.2 million

TikTok information
- Page: rainaiscrazy
- Years active: 2018–present
- Followers: 6.3 million

Twitch information
- Channel: rainaiscrazyy
- Followers: 7.7 thousand

X information
- Handle: @OmgItzRaina
- Display name: Raina Huang
- Years active: 2009–present
- Followers: 49.6 thousand

YouTube information
- Channels: Raina Huang; RainaisCrazy
- Years active: 2010–present
- Subscribers: 1.25 million
- Views: 530 million
- Last updated: June 7, 2026
- Website: www.rainaiscrazy.com

Raina Huang (born October 20, 1994) is an American competitive eater and Internet celebrity, known for eating large quantities of food despite her diminutive size.

== Personal life ==
Huang was born in Los Angeles County, California, and is of Chinese descent; In 2019, she was living with her parents in the small town of Walnut, California.

Huang attended University of California, Riverside where she studied business. She then dropped out to pursue competitive eating and social media influencing career. Her father works in information technology and she has a younger sister.

She was also the first female chef for Benihana.

== Competitive eating ==
Huang attributes her ability to eat large quantities of food to her small stature, explaining that too much abdominal fat prevents the stomach from expanding.

She has been competing since around 2017 after being challenged to eat a four-pound burrito. To prepare, she fasts and exercises before a challenge, often not eating on the day of. In 2022, it was reported that she was doing around 100 eating challenges a year.

She posts videos of her eating challenges to various social media platforms, having approximately 2.9 million followers.

In addition to humans, she has also competed against animals; one challenge seeing who could eat more salad, Huang or a giant rabbit. Huang won the competition, admitting that she rarely eats salad outside of competitions.

She has faced some backlash over her efforts from businesses; she was kicked out of a Colorado pizzeria in 2019, the owner suspecting she was trying to "scam" the restaurant. The video of her being asked to leave was posted to her social media channels; despite the negative comments from the owner, she wished them well.

== See also ==
- List of competitive eaters
