= Shahina Waseem =

British competitive eater

- Other name: UK Chilli Queen
- Education: Brunel University London
- Known for: Competitive chilli eater
- Website: UK Chilli Queen

Shahina Waseem is a world champion competitive chilli eater from Uxbridge, Middlesex. As at November 2023, she had an unbeaten streak consisting of 97 consecutive wins in chilli eating competitions in the UK, USA and Belgium. She ranks second in the Official League of Fire (LOF) world ranking, which recognises “the best of the best chilli heads on the planet”.

== Personal life ==
Waseem's parents moved to the UK from Pakistan before she was born. She studied mechanical engineering with aeronautics at Brunel University London. After graduating in 2004 she started a property letting company.

== Competitive chilli eating ==
Waseem's first competitive chilli eating competition was in 2012 at the Kingston Food Festival. Her favourite pepper is the Thai Bird's eye chili. Of competitive chilli eating she said, “it’s a form of extreme competitive sport which is not affected by age or gender.”

After her third win, in 2015, she described the experience of competing as ““the pain from my lips, mouth and throat being on fire, ear drums feeling like they were about to explode, face muscles twitching involuntarily, hands shaking uncontrollably, shivers, chills and shakes and violent body tremors... followed by muscle spasms and cramps and heartburn.”

In 2019 she competed against, and beat, US champion, Johnny Scoville in Guildford, UK. She then flew to America and competed against, and beat, Dustin “Atomik Menace” Johnson. In order to raise the funds for the trip she ate 105 Carolina Reapers in one sitting; the only woman to have ever done this.

Of the 71 competitions she had entered by 2021 she had “failed to throw up afterward about 11 times, which means you get the dreaded cap cramps: gastric distress caused by capsaicin in the GI tract.”

In 2021 she was the world record holder for the most consecutive wins at chilli-eating competitions with 81 consecutive wins. The person ranked second behind her at that point had 8.

A selection of Shahina Waseem's chilli eating competition results
Year	Competition	Location	Position
2012	Kingston Food Festival	Kingston Upon Thames, UK	1st
2014	Battersea Chilli Challenge	Battersea Park, UK	1st
2016	Oxfordshire Chilli Festival	Abingdon, UK	1st
2018	Chipping Campden Chilli Eating Competition	Chipping Campden, UK	1st
2019	LOF World Title Belt Match @ The Cheese and Chilli Festival	Guildford, UK	1st
2019	Speed-Eating contest	Sacramento, California USA	1st
2019	League of Fire World Title Belt Match (Trilogy)	Ham, Belgium	1st
2019	World Chilli Eating Champs	Newcastle upon Tyne, UK	1st
2019	League of Fire Cognoscenti Non-Title Belt Match (Revenge)	Secret location, South Carolina, USA	1st
2022	League of Fire Pantheon Event Extreme Chilli-Eating Contest	Secret location, South Carolina, USA	1st

=== Other chilli-related activities ===
Waseem features on the labels of two bottles of chilli sauce made by The Chilli Project: Killer Queen Chug Challenge and Killer Queen 2 Chug Challenge. In 2022 she partnered with GymBox to create a chilli-based workout system based around capsaicin, the active ingredient in chilli, and its ability to increase body temperature and oxygen consumption. She hosts chilli eating competitions, including the World Halal Food Festival at the London Stadium in September 2023.

== TV and book appearances ==
- Food: Truth or Scare (BBC One) Series 5, episode 3. Aired 22 July 2020
- Game of Talents (ITV) Series 1, episode 2 where she took on DJ Jordan North in a chilli eating competition
- Good Morning Britain (ITV) July 2019

In 2021 Waseem was interviewed for two books:

- Cowart, Leigh (2021). Hurts So Good: The Science and Culture of Pain on Purpose. London, UK: PublicAffairs. ISBN 978-1541798038.
- Mahmood-Ahmed, Saliha (2021). Foodology: A Food Lover's Guide to Digestive Health and Happiness. London, UK: Hodder & Stoughton. ISBN 978-1529319828.
