= Ryan Nerz =

American gonzo journalist

Alfred Ryan Nerz is an American gonzo journalist from Columbus, Indiana. He is also an author of two books that were featured in The New York Times Book review and Entertainment Weekly.

== Career ==
He freelanced for NPR, Esquire, History channel and Huffpost. He also wrote for several other media outlets including The Village Voice and Time Out New York. He works for Fusion as a reporter about America's weed subculture.

Nerz joined International Federation of Competitive Eating (IFOCE - later Major League eating) as an emcee in 2003.

He published his book Eat This Book after a year of working as a moderator for eating competitions. It is an account about competitive eating events that are sanctioned by Major League Eating.

His book Marijuanamerica revolves around America's current weed subculture in relation to the counterculture of the 60s.

After publishing his book, Fusion hired Nerz and named him Chief Cannabis correspondent. Nerz covers the news of the cannabis market and the change of its legal status throughout the United States.

== Books ==
- Eat this book: A year of Gorging and Glory on the Competitive Circuit.
- Marijuanamerica: Why America Loves Weed.
