= Theetta Rappai =

Indian competitive eater (1939– 2006)

- Born: Painadan Kuriappan Rappai; 20 April 1939; Thrissur, Kerala, India
- Died: 9 December 2006 (aged 67); Thrissur, Kerala, India
- Other name: Monster eater
- Occupation: Competitive eater

Theetta Rappai (20 April 1939 – 9 December 2006) was an Indian competitive eater who used to eat enormous quantities of food. Rappai used to eat 75 idli for breakfast, buckets of rice and curries for lunch, and 60 chapatis for dinner. He is known to have eaten 250 idlis and 1.5 kg of pudding and halwa in one sitting. On a different occasion, he is known to have consumed 75 idlis, 2.5 kg appam, and buckets of payasam. Rappai had won several eating competitions in and outside Kerala. His name had been included in the Limca Book of Records.

== Early life ==
Rappai was born on 20 April 1939 in Thrissur city, India, as the eldest among the seven children of the late Kuriappan and the late Thandamma. He shot to fame after he challenged a Thrissur restaurant that offered an all-you-can-eat buffet. He polished off three bucketfuls of rice, one bucket of fish curry, and 10 kg cooked meat. At the end of it, he quipped that he was still hungry. Finally, the restaurant staff had to call the police. Doctors ascribed his insatiable appetite to a hypothalamus dysfunction in the brain. This meant that he did not get the sensation to stop eating. In July 2006, Rappai's huge appetite had to be curtailed because he developed a severe stomach ache and diabetes. Due to these problems, he retired from eating enormous quantities and relied on normal eating.

== Death ==
Theetta Rappai died in Jubilee Mission Hospital in Thrissur city at 4:30 AM (IST) on 9 December 2006, aged 67. He was a bachelor. He had retired from eating competitions earlier that year, after he was diagnosed with diabetes and hypertension. He was 120 kg when he died and his family had to build a special coffin for him. He was buried at Lourdes Church, Thrissur. At the time of his death, he was survived by his mother and siblings.

== Film ==
Director Winu Ramakrishnan filmed the story of Theetta Rappai as a Malayalam movie in 2018 titled Theetta Rappai. Kalabhavan Mani's brother RLV Ramakrishnan played the title role of Theetta Rappai in this film.
