= Fat men's club =

Type of social club

Fat men's clubs were a type of social club that peaked in popularity from the late 19th to early 20th centuries, primarily in the United States. Membership was typically limited to men weighing over 200 lb (91 kg), and members were generally quite wealthy as well. Fat men's clubs declined in the 20th century as male obesity transitioned to being perceived as a primarily negative trait.

== Description ==
Fat men's clubs typically required prospective members to weigh in at over 200 pounds in addition to demanding a small membership fee. Club members were typically wealthy, and the clubs often arranged busy social calendars for their membership that included balls, sports events and banquets, which often doubled as networking events.

Fat men's club events often opened with a public weigh-in of the membership, with prizes for the heaviest men. Competition at these public weigh-ins was heated enough to inspire widespread cheating, with participants loading down their pockets with weights in order to appear heavier. Many clubs ran eating contests before the official weighing.

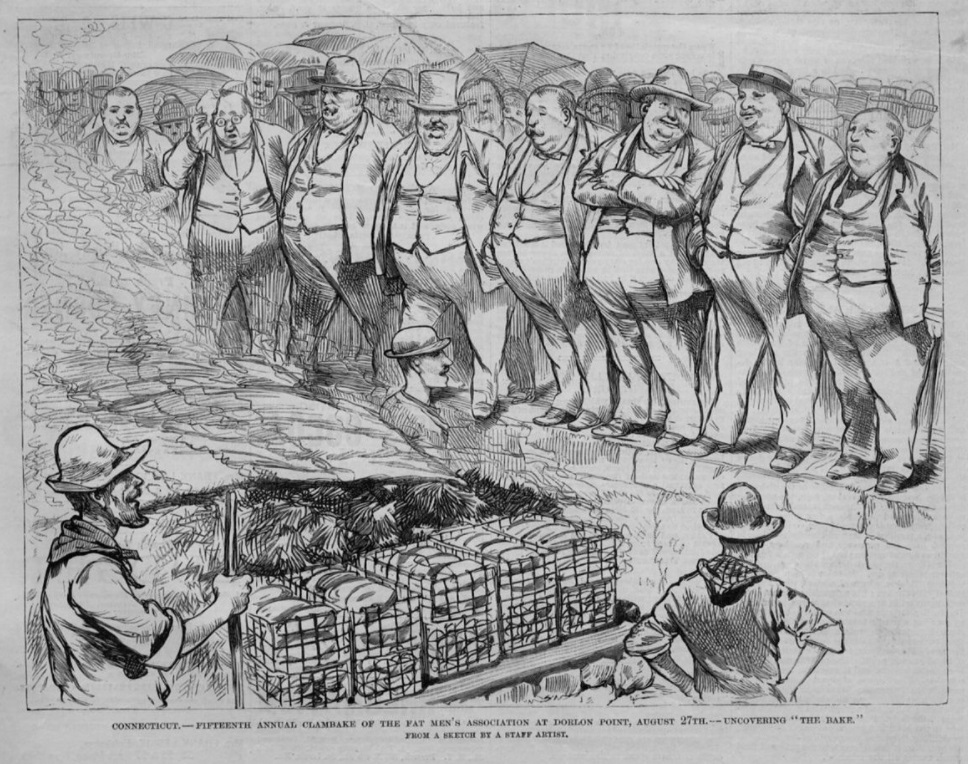
Engraving from an August 1884 issue of Frank Leslie Illustrated Newspaper showing a meeting of the Fat Men's Association in Connecticut

== History ==
Fat men's clubs were most prominent during a time when societal attitudes towards male obesity were largely positive: being overweight was seen as a sign of economic success, and was also thought to correspond with kindness and good humor. The first fat men's club was founded in New York City in 1869.

Some fat women's clubs existed as well, but these were much less common, as fat was seen as less desirable in women. Fat women's clubs in the style of fat men's clubs were outnumbered by women's weight loss clubs even at the fad's height.

Fat men's clubs were popular throughout the United States, and were particularly common in the state of Texas. Fat men's clubs were started in France, Serbia, and the UK as well.

In the early 20th century, the popularity of fat men's clubs waned as obesity became increasingly associated with bad health, and the fat men's clubs themselves drew contempt as newspapers shifted from celebrating their banquets to decrying them as grotesque conspicuous consumption. The New England Fat Men's Club, which at one point had 10,000 members, disbanded in 1924 with only 38 members, none of whom actually met the 200 lb. standard prerequisite for membership. The advent of the bathroom scale also contributed to the decline of fat men's clubs, as weight measurement transitioned from being a public spectacle to an exercise that was carried out in the privacy of one's home.

== See also ==
- Ugly Men's Association
