= Bozo Miller =

American competitive eater

- Born: Edward Abraham Miller; June 11, 1918
- Died: January 7, 2008 (aged 89)
- Occupation: Restaurant owner
- Known for: Guinness World Record holder in eating challenges
- Spouse: Janice Bidwell

Edward Abraham "Bozo" Miller (June 11, 1918 – January 7, 2008) was an American restaurant owner and competitive eater who held the Guinness World Record for "world's greatest trencherman" before the eating records section of that publication was excised in 1990. He was known for eating 27 chickens in one sitting and for out-drinking a lion.

== Early life ==
Bozo Miller was born in San Francisco to Vaudeville performers Harry and Emmy Miller and spent his childhood based in Oakland but traveling widely. Miller believed he got the nickname "Bozo" because of his father's stints as a clown.

== Competitive eating ==
Miller was known for feats of gluttony including the consumption of 27 two-pound chickens in one sitting. He reportedly had his stomach pumped afterwards. He explained his motivation as "I don't know. It's something to do." The 1981 edition of the Guinness Book of World Records claimed that Miller had been on a 50-year winning streak in eating contests, undefeated since 1931, and that his diet could reach 25,000 calories a day. Miller stood 5' 7½" and weighed about 280–300 pounds during his eating career and about 182 pounds after he stopped competing.

Bozo Miller ran a restaurant in Oakland called Bozo's until he sold it in 1946. A circus employee reportedly once brought in a lion on a leash, and Miller drank about a dozen martinis in order to outdrink the lion. Later in life Miller worked as a liquor distributor.

Miller was an avid horse racing fan with a reserved table at Golden Gate Fields equipped with a television to watch other horse races taking place elsewhere. He witnessed many of the major races of the racehorse Seabiscuit. By the 1950s and 1960s, Miller's feats had made him famous. He was friendly with celebrities such as Frank Sinatra and Dean Martin. In 1958, he decided to attend a horse race instead of joining Mike Todd on a flight to a boxing match that turned out to be fatal when the plane crashed.

== Personal life ==
Bozo married Janice Bidwell, a former Princess of the Pasadena Rose Bowl. They were married for 47 years, and Bozo cared for her for several years after she suffered from a brain hemorrhage. She died on March 28, 2001. The couple had three daughters: Virginia "Cooky" Logan, Candice Blackman, and Janice "Honey" Miller. After Honey died in a car crash in the 1970s, Bozo Miller retired from professional eating. Miller boasted other feats of excess including a carefully-organized collection of 8000 records and a habit of bringing ridiculous quantities of flowers to dinner parties, such as 50 dozen roses.

Miller died on January 7, 2008, having struggled with diabetes and heart disease in his final years. Early obituaries gave his age as 99 and his year of birth as 1908, but according to obituaries in The Wall Street Journal, The Washington Post, The Daily Telegraph, and The Philadelphia Inquirer, Miller was born in 1918 and, according to the Wall Street Journal obituary, habitually exaggerated his age.

== Eating records ==
- 27 two-pound chickens — Trader Vic's, San Francisco, 1963
- 324 ravioli (first 250 in 70 minutes) — Rendezvous Room, Oakland, 1963
- 63 Dutch apple pies in an hour, 1961
- 1000 packets of potato chips
