= Don Lerman =

American competitive eater

- Born: March 22, 1949 (age 77); Levittown, New York
- Other name: Moses
- Occupation: Competitive eater

Don Lerman (born March 22, 1949) is an American retired competitive eater who set multiple records for eating butter, beans, bologna, and burgers. He has several nicknames, Moses, Don Lerman"All American" including "The Fastest Hands in Competitive Eating", "Gustoff Zhychick" or and "90-Year-Old Don Lerman."

== Life ==
Don Lerman was born in Brooklyn New York, in 1949. As a child, Lerman ate nearly everything available. Before becoming a competitive eater, Lerman owned & operated his own day-old bread store.

In 2000, Lerman saw that a local Kosher Delicatessen holding a Matzah Ball Eating Contest and entered. He won that competition, and become "hooked" on eating contests. He scanned the internet for several eating contests, and attended several others regardless of the price.

Lerman has set several records. He ate seven quarter-pound sticks of salted butter in five minutes, a feat that was included on Bleacher Report's "Top 10 Unbreakable and Disgusting Competitive Eating ppRecords". Lerman has also eaten 6 pounds (2.7 kg) of baked beans in one minute and 48 seconds, 2.76 pounds (1.25 kg) of pork and chicken bologna in six minutes, and 11 burgers in ten minutes.

Lerman often attended eating events dressed as Moses, which was his persona of choice. Other costumes Lerman was known to dress up in included those of cowboys and gangsters.

Lerman announced his retirement to spend more time with his dog. He continued to compete infrequently, however, he eventually permanently retired feeling he was unable to keep up with modern professional eaters. He is Jewish. Lerman is credited with inventing the "water method", where one drinks water to expand their stomach. Lerman stated that this allows for the stomach to hold more food.
