= Belt of fat theory =

Theory in competitive eating

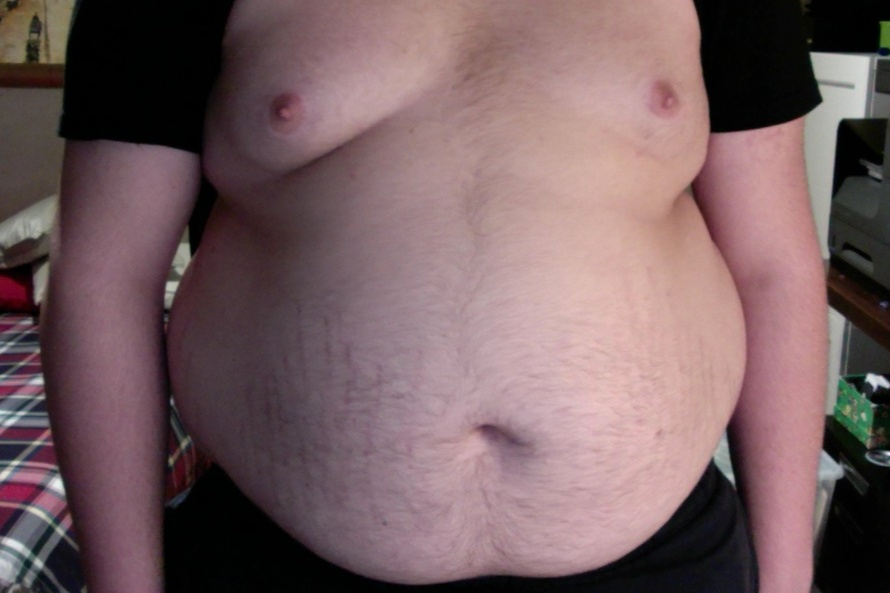
People with a "belt of fat" around their midsections may suffer losses in competitive eating contests due to it.

In competitive eating, the belt of fat theory posits that, paradoxically, those who have a higher body fat percentage are less well positioned to win contests. This is due to the eponymous "belt of fat" around the midsections of competitors, made up of subcutaneous and visceral fat, which constricts rapid expansion of their stomachs. Originally forwarded in 1998 by Major League Eating (then known as the International Federation of Competitive Eating), the belt of fat theory has gone on to become widely accepted by competitive eaters.

While not widely studied, the theory has seen some degree of acceptance in scientific publications, including Popular Science and the Canadian Medical Association Journal.
