= Joe LaRue =

American competitive eater

- Born: February 13, 1960 (age 65); Binghamton, New York
- Education: Johnson and Wales University
- Occupation(s): Executive chef, competitive eater

"Jammin'" Joe LaRue (born February 13, 1960) is a competitive eater from Binghamton, New York who lives in Dayton, Nevada.

LaRue was educated at Johnson and Wales University.

He is an independent competitive eater associated with All Pro Eating. Previously he was a ranked member (as high as 7th) of mle. LaRue, a culinary arts professional, had notable years of competition from 2003 to 2011, winning an 84 Lumber baked bean eating bout, winning the Footy's Y-100 Wing Ding chicken wing eating contest and placing second at the Sweet Corn Fiesta's Sweet Corn Eating Championship. It was his victory in the 2005 sweet corn eating match (31 ears of sweet corn in 12 minutes) that showed he has top-tier ability. He has held the world record in sweet corn for seven years, with 46 ears of corn eaten in 12 min set in 2010. He currently holds records of pickles, with 4 lb of sour garlic dill eaten in 5 min, Mall food, with 107 oz eaten in 6 min, and 14 Camp Washington coney dogs in 3 min. While LaRue no longer competes on a full-time basis, he continues to participate in select contests and challenges. As of 2019 he held the record for eating 35 flapjacks in 15 minutes.

Being an executive chef and graduating magna cum laude with a Bachelor of Science degree in culinary arts, LaRue understands the properties of the food he eats and uses that knowledge to advance his natural athletic talent. He is 6 feet 7 inches tall, and is in good physical condition, but he continues to train at the gym to give himself an edge at the table.
