= Brian Subich =

American competitive eater

"Big" Brian Subich is a competitive eater who has participated in the Nathan's Hot Dog Eating Contest and the Alka-Seltzer US Open of Competitive Eating.

== Personal ==
He is originally from Johnstown, Pennsylvania.
