= Eric Booker =

American competitive eater and rapper

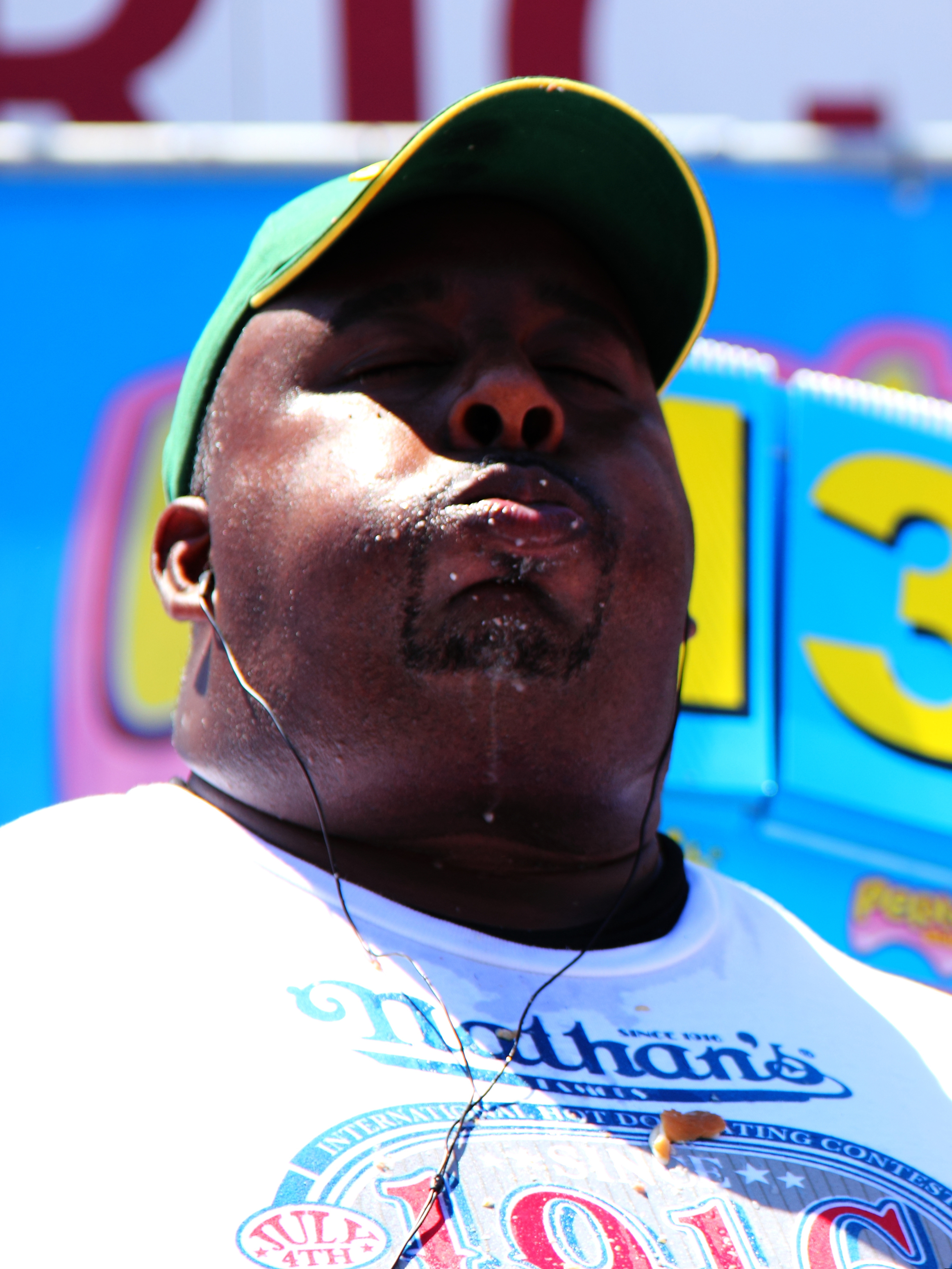
- Booker at the 2010 Nathan's Hot Dog Contest

Personal information
- Nicknames: BadlandsChugs, Badlands Booker
- Born: June 21, 1969 (age 57) Queens, New York, U.S.
- Occupation: Competitive eater
- Years active: 1997–present
- Height: 6 ft 5 in (196 cm)
- Weight: 400 lb (181 kg)
- Spouse: Regina Booker

YouTube information
- Channel: BadlandsChugs
- Years active: 2012–present
- Subscribers: 3.68 million
- Views: 445 million
- Last updated: April 1, 2026

Eric James "Badlands" Booker (born June 21, 1969), also known by his online pseudonym BadlandsChugs, is an American competitive eating athlete, rapper, and YouTuber. He holds seven Major League Eating recognized world records, three Guinness World Records, is a four-time Nathan's Lemonade Chugging Contest champion, and competed in the Nathan's Hot Dog Eating Contest every year from 1997 to 2018.

== Biography ==
By age 20, Booker began training his chug skills and training to compete in food championships. Booker lives on Long Island, he’s 6 ft 5 1/4 in (1.96 m) tall and weighs 400 lb (180 kg).

He appeared on America's Got Talent in 2025.

== Competitive eating career ==
=== Nathan's Famous Hot Dog Eating Contest results ===
2020 Contest	20	5th place
2018 Contest	20	21st place
2017 Contest	22	T-14th place
2016 Contest	25	12th place
2015 Contest	24.5	9th place
2014 Contest	25	9th place
2013 Contest	21	15th place
2012 Contest	25.5	12th place
2010 Contest	24	T-12th place
2009 Contest	30	T-10th place
2008 Contest	25.5	11th place
2006 Contest	24.5	9th place
2005 Contest	22	T-10th place
2004 Contest	27	T-5th place
2003 Contest	29	3rd place
2002 Contest	26	2nd place
2001 Contest	22	T-7th place
2000 Contest	20	T-10th place
1999 Contest	17	10th place
1998 Contest	18	2nd place
1997 Contest	17	8th place

Booker trains for competitions by trying to stretch his stomach and develop jaw strength. He eats large amounts of fruit and vegetables and drinks gallons of water in a sitting position in order to stretch his stomach and chews over 20 pieces of gum at a time to build jaw strength. He maintains that competitive eating is a healthy sport and has lost weight since he began competing. As of 2022, he is ranked 27th by the IFOCE. Booker is also known for his YouTube channel, BadlandsChugs, in which he primarily performs soda chugging challenges, including Mountain Dew, Sprite, Gatorade, and milk. In 2019, over the span of a year, his YouTube channel amassed over 3 million subscribers.

=== Nathan's Lemonade Chugging Contest (2021-present) ===
At the 2021 Nathan's Hot Dog Eating Contest, Booker won a lemonade drinking contest by consuming one gallon of lemonade in under 40 seconds. He captured his second lemonade chugging contest title in 2022, and repeated in 2023, setting a record of 23.08 seconds. In 2024, he continued his lemonade-chugging winning streak, breaking his 2023 record with a time of 21 seconds.

For the 2025 contest, Booker drank a gallon and a half of lemonade. He drank a gallon of lemonade in 21 seconds to capture his sixth consecutive title in 2026.

=== Accomplishments ===
Some of Booker's accomplishments include:

- Burritos: 15 BurritoVille burritos/ 8 minutes
- Candy bars: Two Pounds Chocolate Candy Bars / 6 minutes
- Cannoli: 16.5 cannoli in six minutes / 2004
- Corned Beef Hash: 4 pounds of hash / 1 minute 58 seconds
- Cheesecake (Mini): 50 Mini-Cheesecakes / 6 minutes
- Doughnuts: 49 glazed doughnuts / 8 minutes
- Hamentaschen: 50 Hamentaschen / 6 minutes
- Matzo Ball (Ben's Deli): 21 baseball-sized (half-pound) matzo balls / 5 minutes, 25 seconds / 2003
- Matzo Balls (Ruthie & Gussie's): 30 matzo balls / 5 minutes, 25 seconds
- Raw Onions: 8.5 ounces Maui Onions (three onions)/ Whalers Village / 1 minute/ August 8, 2004
- Peas: 9.5 one-pound bowls / 12 minutes
- Pumpkin pies: 4 3/8 Entenmann's Pumpkin Pies / 12 Minutes/ November 22, 2004
- Lemonade: Nathan's Famous chug contest / 1 gallon lemonade / 21 seconds / July 4, 2024
- In May 2021, he set the Guinness World Record for the fastest time to drink two litres of soda (18.45 seconds).
- In June 2022, he set two more Guinness World Records, drinking 1 liter of soda in 6.8 seconds and 1 liter of tomato sauce in 1 minute and 18 seconds.

== Music career ==
Since 2004, Booker has performed and recorded competitive eating themed hip-hop as Badlands Booker, and he frequently performs selections from his albums at competitions. Besides his own nine albums, Booker has also made guest appearances on albums by Jendor and Loser's Lounge. Much of the music used on his YouTube channel is created by himself and his son Brandon Booker (OKHIPHOP).

Discography
Title	Year
Hungry & Focused	2004
Hungry & Focused II: The Ingestion Engine	2005
Hungry & Focused III: The Reframing	2006
Hungry & Focused IV: Fork, Knife & Mic	2007
Extended Play	2009
Surf & Stillwell	2010
Big Man Mentality	2011
Surf & Stillwell 2	2017
Surf & Stillwell 3	2018
Big Man Mentality 2	2019

== See also ==
- List of competitive eaters
