= Shoenice =

American competitive eater and YouTuber (born 1969)

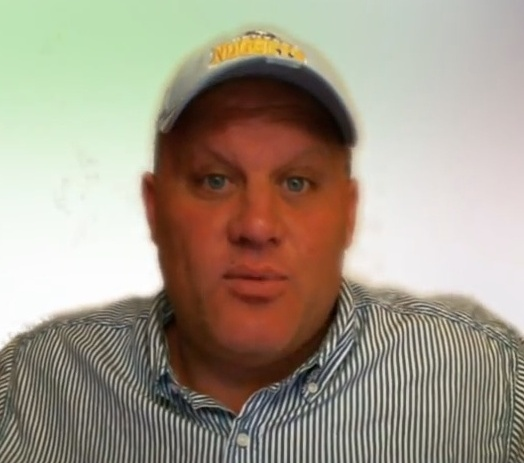
- Schewe in 2014
- Born: May 30, 1969 (age 57); Albany, New York, U.S.
- Occupations: YouTuber; comedian

YouTube information
- Channel: ShoeNice 22
- Genres: Competitive eating; Pranks; Podcasting
- Subscribers: 214 thousand
- Views: 4.4 million
- Last updated: October 21, 2025

Christopher Thomas Schewe (born May 30, 1969), also known by his internet alias of Shoenice, is an American comedian, competitive eater, and YouTuber.

== Personal life and career ==
Schewe is of German & Russian descent. His YouTube channel was started by his son on April 11, 2008. On the channel, Schewe ate unusual food such as burgers with the wrapping paper and toilet paper, and drank large amounts of vodka.

In 2011, Schewe protested with students at University at Albany, SUNY following the suspension of Fountain Day at the college.
