= Patrick Bertoletti =

American competitive eater (born 1985)

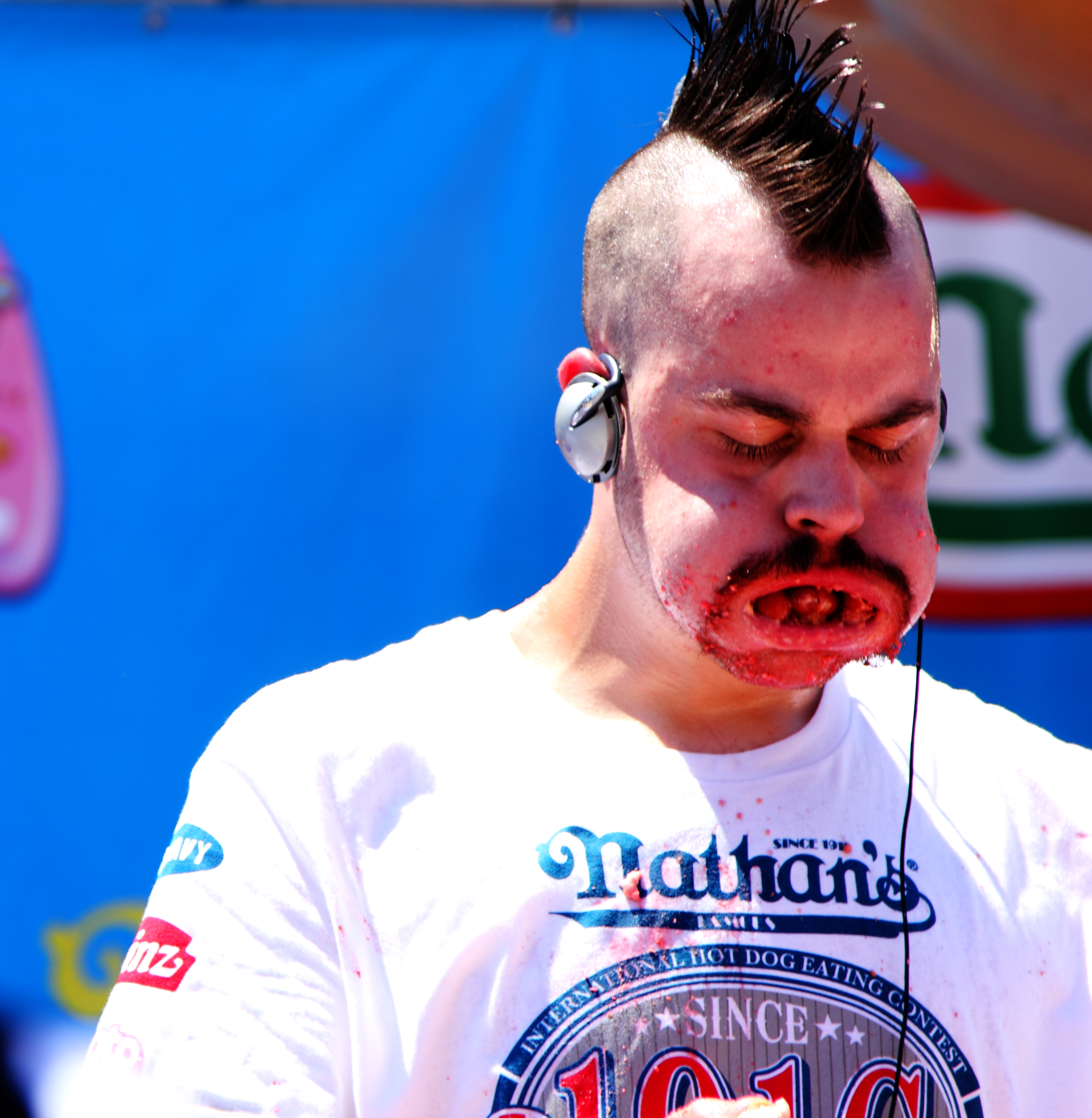
- Bertoletti fills his mouth with hot dogs in the 2010 Nathan's Hot Dog Eating Contest
- Born: June 6, 1985 (age 41); Palos Heights, Illinois, U.S.
- Occupation: Competitive eater

Patrick "Deep Dish" Bertoletti (born June 6, 1985) is an American competitive eater from Chicago. He takes part in a variety of different eating competitions—notable wins include the 2024 Nathan's Hot Dog Eating Contest and the first-ever world poutine eating competition in Toronto. He also holds numerous world records, including the most milk consumed in an hour.

== Competitive eating career ==
=== Nathan's Famous Hot Dog Eating Contest results ===
2026 Contest	51	2nd place
2025 Contest	46.5	2nd place
2024 Contest	58	1st place
2022 Contest	33.5	5th place
2012 Contest	51	3rd place
2011 Contest	53	2nd place
2010 Contest	37	3rd place
2009 Contest	55	3rd place
2008 Contest	38	4th place
2007 Contest	49	3rd place
2006 Contest	34	4th place

=== 2007 ===
On January 2, 2007, Bertoletti became the first person to complete the Sasquatch Burger Contest at Bigfoot Lodge Cafe in Memphis, Tennessee. 679 people had tried to finish the burger and fries that starts with 4 pounds (1.8 kg) of hamburger meat on a homemade bun, Bertoletti finished the meal in 11 minutes and 5 seconds.

On July 4, 2007, he finished third in the 92nd annual Nathan's Hot Dog Eating Contest in Coney Island, Brooklyn, New York, having eaten 49 hot dogs and buns in that competition.

On September 16, 2007, he won the La Costeña "Feel the Heat" Jalapeño Eating Championship in Chicago, Illinois. This competition was marred when the event organizers ran out of jalapeños before the end of the competition.

On October 9, 2007, he upset points leader Joey Chestnut and held off a comeback by second ranked Takeru Kobayashi to win the chicken wing "Chowdown" in Las Vegas shown on Spike TV.

On November 22, 2007, he won Spike TV Major League Eating "Turkey Bowl". Bertoletti consumed 6.91 pounds (3.13 kg) of (whole) turkey in 8 minutes, upsetting the previous year's winner, Joey Chestnut.

=== 2008 ===
On April 12, 2008, he won the ACME Oyster House 2008 World Oyster Eating Championships by downing 35 dozen raw oysters on the half shell in eight minutes in New Orleans, Louisiana.

On July 4, 2008, he finished 4th at the Nathan's Famous contest, consuming 38 HDB (hot dogs and buns) in the 10-minute contest.

On September 1, 2008, he finished 3rd at the Skyline Chili Spaghetti Eating Contest, consuming 11 pounds (5.0 kg) in the 10-minute contest.

On September 28, 2008, he finished in 2nd at the Krystal Square Off, eating 85 Krystal burgers, one more than Takeru "Tsunami" Kobayashi.

=== 2009 ===
On March 16, 2009, he won the Stroehmann Sandwich Slamm, eating 16 3/4 8-ounce (230 g) corned-beef sandwiches in the 10-minute contest.

On July 4, 2009, Patrick placed 3rd in the Nathan's Famous contest, eating 55 HDBs.

On September 2, 2009, Patrick won the Nugget Rib Eating Championship at the Best in the West Nugget Rib Cook-off, eating 5.8 pounds (2.6 kg) of pork rib meat in 12 minutes.

=== 2010 ===
In May 2010, Patrick became the world poutine eating champion after scarfing down 13 pounds (5.9 kg) of gravy-and-cheese-soaked fries in a mere 10 minutes. He edged out 11 fellow stars of Major League Eating and three Canadian amateur eaters by consuming box after box of poutine at Toronto's BMO Field in the first World Poutine Eating Championship.

On July 4, 2010, Patrick took third place in the Nathan's Famous Hot Dog Eating contest by eating 37 hot dogs in ten minutes.

On July 22, 2010, Patrick beat Joey Chestnut to win the Mars bar eating competition. He ate 38 bars in just over four minutes.

=== 2011 ===
On May 1, 2011, Patrick took first place in the La Costeña "Feel the Heat" Jalapeño Eating Championship and set a world record by eating 275 pickled jalapeños in eight minutes.

On June 5, 2011, Patrick took first place in the Acme Oyster House Oyster Eating Contest and set a Louisiana state record by eating 39 dozen (468 individual) oysters in eight minutes.

On July 4, 2011, Patrick took second place in the Nathan's Famous Hot Dog Eating contest by eating 53 hot dogs in ten minutes.

=== 2012 ===
On January 23, 2012, Patrick took first place in The Isle Boonville World Boneless Buffalo Wing Eating Championship by eating 6.75 pounds (3.06 kg) of Buffalo wings in 10 minutes.

On July 4, 2012, Patrick took third place in the Nathan's Hot Dog Eating Contest, eating 51 HDB in ten minutes.

On September 9, 2012, Patrick took first place in Wild Eggs National Pancake Eating Championship by eating 50 king pancakes in 10 minutes.

=== 2013 ===
On February 3, 2013, Patrick took first place in Fat Tuesday King Cake Eating World Championship by eating 12 king cakes in eight minutes.

On July 3, 2013, Patrick took first place in Z-Burger Independence Burger eating Championship by eating 28 burgers in ten minutes.

On October 6, 2013, Patrick took second place in Canada's biggest pizza eating contest by eating 39 slices of pizza in 12 minutes.

=== 2014 ===
He set a record for most milk consumed in an hour by drinking 2.5 US gallons (9.5 L).

=== 2015 ===
He won the 2015 Wing Bowl by eating 444 wings in 26 minutes.

=== 2022 ===
After a 10-year retirement from the Nathan's Hot Dog Eating Contest, Bertoletti returned to the competition, eating 33.5 HDB in ten minutes to finish fifth.

=== 2024 ===
On March 3, 2024, Bertoletti placed 5th in the Inaugural Eating Uranus Fudge Galactic Championship at Uranus, Missouri. He gulped down 7.75 pounds (3.52 kg) of chocolate fudge in eight minutes.

After not competing in 2023, Bertoletti returned to the Nathan's Hot Dog Eating Contest in 2024. He captured his first victory in the event by eating 58 hot dogs and buns in 10 minutes for the Mustard Belt title.

=== World records ===
- 16 inches (41 cm) pizza: 47 slices in 10 minutes
- Blueberry pie (hands-free): 9.17 pounds (4.16 kg) in 8 minutes
- Chicken wings: 4.1 pounds (1.9 kg) in 8 minutes
- Chocolate: 1 pound 15.5 ounces (890 g) in 7 minutes
- Corned beef and cabbage: 10.63 pounds (4.82 kg) in 10 minutes
- Corned beef sandwiches: 11 eight-ounce (230 g) sandwiches in 10 minutes
- Date Nut Bread: 29.5 date nut bread and cream cheese sandwiches in 8 minutes
- Doughnuts (cream-filled): 47 glazed and cream-filled doughnuts in 5 minutes
- Grits: 21 pounds (9.5 kg) in 10 minutes
- Ice cream (short form): 1.75 pounds (0.79 kg) vanilla ice cream in 8 minutes
- Jalapeño peppers (pickled): 98 after eating 47 donuts in 5 minutes
- Jalapeño peppers (pickled): 191 in 6.5 minutes
- Jalapeño peppers (pickled): 275 in 8 minutes
- Key lime pie: 10.8 pounds (4.9 kg) in 8 minutes
- Kolaches: 44 cherry kolaches in 8 minutes
- Oysters (short form): 34 dozen in 8 minutes
- Peanut butter and jelly sandwiches: 42 sandwiches in 10 minutes
- Pozole: 9 pounds 3 ounces (4.2 kg) in 12 minutes
- Shoo-fly pie: 11.1 pounds (5.0 kg) in 8 minutes
- Strawberry rhubarb pie: 7.9 pounds (3.6 kg) in 8 minutes
- Strawberry shortcake: 15.25 pounds (6.92 kg) in 8 minutes
- Waffles: 29 eight-ounce (230 g) waffles in 10 minutes
- Whole turkey: 4 pounds 12.8 ounces (2,180 g) of roast turkey meat in 12 minutes
- Whole turkey (short form): 6.91 pounds (3.13 kg) of roast turkey meat in 8 minutes

== Media appearances ==
Bertoletti was featured on the cover of the Chicago Reader on Friday June 30, 2006. The story described his abilities and his ambitions for the summer competition.

Bertoletti and food truck partner Tim Brown appeared as "Glutton Force 5" on a Season 2 episode of the Food Network's Food Court Wars in March 2014. The pair won for their "Taco in a Bag" concept and were awarded free rent for one year for a location in the food court at Spring Hill Mall located in West Dundee, Illinois, as part of their prize.

== Personal life ==
Bertoletti is a graduate of Morgan Park Academy and Kendall College. He was a co-owner and chef of the restaurant "Taco in a Bag" in the Lincoln Square neighborhood of Chicago.

He is an avid reader of the Girl Talk series by author L.E. Blair.

== See also ==
- List of competitive eaters
