= Bob Shoudt =

American competitive eater

- Born: October 16, 1966 (age 59)
- Occupations: YouTuber, competitive eater, IT Manager

YouTube information
- Channel: Notorious B.O.B.
- Subscribers: 204 thousand
- Views: 21 million

Bob Shoudt (born October 16, 1966), also known as "Humble Bob" or "Notorious B.O.B." (the name of his YouTube channel), is an American competitive eater from Royersford, Pennsylvania.

He holds numerous eating records, including the most food ever eaten by weight and/or volume: 23.4 lbs or 312 fluid ounces of salmon chowder, consumed in 6 minutes. He also holds the record for the most food ever eaten in four hours (59.6 lbs) at The Reading Phillies Gluttony Night on June 12, 2018, and the most hot dogs ever eaten at the Fish Tales 4 July hot dog eating contest (52) in Ocean City, Maryland. In 2017 he won WIP's Wing Bowl, eating 409 wings and claiming the largest prize ever won in an eating contest - $50,000 (Hyundai Santa Fe Sport, $10,000 USD, ring, pendant, crown).

Outside of YouTube and eating contests, Shoudt is an IT manager. He is an avid mountain climber and fitness fanatic who has scaled Mount Washington, New Hampshire, Pikes Peak, Colorado and Mount Haleakala, Maui; he is also very active in Krav Maga. He is a 1988 graduate of Ursinus College where he was the captain of the Cross Country Team.

== World records ==
- Salmon chowder 23.4 lbs (2.4 gallons) in six minutes using a spoon December 3, 2009 NYC, IFOCE
- Skyline Chili chili spaghetti: 13.9 lbs in 10 minutes IFOCE
- Roast Beef Sliders: 37½ in eight minutes (November 14, 2009, Frederick, MD - IFOCE sanctioned)
- Krystal Hamburgers: 39 in two minutes (September 9, 2006, Nashville, TN - IFOCE sanctioned)
- Beef brisket sandwiches: 34.75 in 10 minutes
- French fries: 7.9 lbs in 10 minutes
- Broadway at the Beach Ultimate Eating Champion 2006, (April 22, 2006, Myrtle Beach, S.C. - IFOCE sanctioned)
- Chowdown Championship: First Place, Indianapolis, IN (August 19, 2006 - IFOCE sanctioned)
- Penne pasta: Three pounds of penne pasta with marinara in 1 minute, 47 seconds (March 2005, Flemington, NJ IFOCE sanctioned)
- Blueberry pie: 2.2 LB pie in 60 seconds, Today Show, New York City, NY, (July 4, 2005 - IFOCE sanctioned)
- Hot Dogs: 52 hot dogs in 10 minutes "Fish Tales 4th of July Hot Dog eating contest", Ocean City, MD, (July 4, 2016)
- Whoopie pie: 35 5.5 ounce Whoopie pies in 10 minutes, “Reading Fightin Phils", Reading, PA, (June 4, 2018)
- Cheeseburger Dog: 25 2.5 Ounce Cheeseburger Dogs, Cheeseburgers Shaped Like Hot Dogs, in 10 minutes, "Reading Fightin Phils", Reading, Pa (June 23, 2018)
- Most Food Ever Eaten: Reading Phillies Gluttony Night, 59.6 lbs in 4 hours, Reading, PA, (June 18, 2018)
- Cheesesteak 5 pound cheesesteak devoured in 7 minutes 16 seconds. Avenues Steaks Colossal Club world record holder. Elite.

== Records ==
- First place in the Skyline Chili World Eating Championship, Cincinnati, OH, September 1, 2008 (IFOCE Sanctioned).
- First place at Carmine's World Meatball Eating Championship, Atlantic City, NJ, December 2, 2006 (IFOCE Sanctioned).
- First place in the GoldenPalace.com Grilled Cheese Eating Contest qualifier in September 2005, Springfield, IL, (IFOCE sanctioned).
- First place at the Krystal Hamburger Eating Contest qualifier, Perry, GA, September 2005 (IFOCE sanctioned)
- Second place, Krystal World Hamburger Eating Championship, Chattanooga, TN, 95 Krystal's Hamburgers in eight minutes, October 2007 (IFOCE sanctioned)
- Second place, World Lobster Eating Championship, Reno, NV, March 2005 (IFOCE sanctioned)
- Second place, World Pizza Eating Championship, Camden, NJ, August 2005(IFOCE sanctioned)
- Second place, World Chili Eating Challenge, Orlando, FL, February 2013 (IFOCE sanctioned)
- Third place, Verizon Voice Wing Battle World Chicken Wing Eating Championship, Boston, MA, November 2005 (IFOCE sanctioned)
- Third place, Phillip's Seafood World Crabcake Eating Championship, Baltimore, MD, April 2006 (IFOCE sanctioned)
- First place, Wing Bowl 25 Chicken Wing Eating Contest, Philadelphia, PA, February 3, 2017
- First Place, World Sliders Eating Championship, Sao Paulo, Brazil, May 27, 2009
- Avenues Steaks, Philadelphia, PA: colossal club record holder. Devoured 5lb cheesesteak in 7 minutes 16 seconds on March 7th, 2026.

== Personal bests ==
- 95 Krystal Hamburgers - eight minutes
- 39 Krystal Hamburgers - two minutes
- 38½ Johnsonville brats - 10 minutes
- 46 Nathan's Hot Dogs and buns - 10 minutes
- 38 Phillip's Crabcakes - 10 minutes
- 13.9 LB Skyline Chili Spaghetti-10 minutes
- 7.6 LB Carmine's Meatballs - 12 minutes
- 20 Jim's South Street Cheesesteaks - 1.5 hour
- Shoofly pie: 9.25 LB in eight minutes (June 24, 2006, Lancaster, PA - IFOCE sanctioned)
- 67 McDonald's Hamburgers in one sitting - 80 minutes
- 100 Krystal Hamburgers in one sitting - 70 minutes

== See also ==
- List of competitive eaters
