= Major League Eating =

Competitive eating league

- Category: Competitive eating
- Jurisdiction: Global
- Abbreviation: MLE
- Founded: 1997
- Headquarters: New York City, US
- President: James Bell

Official website
- majorleagueeating.com

Major League Eating (MLE) is an organization that oversees professional competitive eating events and television specials. The league airs its annual Nathan's Famous Fourth of July International Hot Dog Eating Contest on ESPN.

Brothers Richard and George Shea took over Nathan's publicity in the mid-1990s and were able to increase the exposure and attendance of Nathan's hot dog eating contest. Seeing a business opportunity, the brothers founded International Federation of Competitive Eating (IFOCE) in 1997 as a sanctioning body to oversee, regulate, and organize events and TV deals. IFOCE's professional league became known as Major League Eating.

Major League Eating coordinates events in the United States and Canada.

== History ==
The International Federation of Competitive Eating, Inc. (IFOCE) is an organization that supervises and regulates eating contests across the globe, acting as a central resource for the sport. Top events include the Nathan's Hot Dog Eating Contest, La Costeña "Feel the Heat" Jalapeño Eating Challenge, the Krystal Square Off World Hamburger Eating Championship, the National Buffalo Wing Festival and the Eating Uranus Fudge Galactic Championship. The IFOCE was founded in 1997 by brothers George and Richard Shea.

The IFOCE counts thousands of competitors in its league, including top-ranked eaters such as Joey Chestnut, Matt Stonie, Sonya Thomas, and Bob Shoudt.The IFOCE develops, promotes and runs more than one hundred events in all variety of venues during its annual circuit.

The organization also produces television shows on competitive eating. In 2002, IFOCE produced The Glutton Bowl, a two-hour eating event on the Fox Network. The Alka-Seltzer U.S. Open of Competitive eating, a three-hour elimination tournament was a 2005 IFOCE production. In 2006, IFOCE produced three hours of programming on ESPN, including a one-hour live show on the 2005 Nathan's Famous hot dog eating contest and one-hour shows on the Johnsonville Foods Bratwurst contest and the Krystal Hamburger contest. In addition, IFOCE produced four 30-minute shows under the title of Tour de Gorge and six 30-minute shows titled Eats of Strength for INHD. In 2007, IFOCE produced four one-hour programs for Spike tv under the title Chowdown.

As of July 4, 2010, the IFOCE was in a dispute with Takeru Kobayashi of Japan over whether competitors may also participate in contests not sanctioned by the IFOCE.

Gonzo journalist Ryan Nerz emceed several competitions in 2003 to research while writing his book Eat This Book.

== Nationwide branches ==
The IFOCE maintains principal offices in New York City and operates in the United States.

The IFOCE maintains a ranking system for competitions it has sanctioned. IFOCE safety measures ensure that all sanctioned matches occur in a controlled environment under the supervision of a licensed emergency medical technician and that only individuals over the age of eighteen compete.

== Mustard Yellow Belt ==
The Mustard Yellow Belt is the organization's signature championship belt. The belt was rediscovered by IFOCE member Mike DeVito in 1993 after being lost for more than two decades in Japan. DeVito received the belt after winning an eating match against Japan's Orio Ito. The belt was restored by the Shea brothers and is now renowned in the competitive eating world. It was held by Takeru Kobayashi from 2001 to 2006, and then by Joey Chestnut since 2007. Chestnut held the Championship Belt for eight years until Matt Stonie beat him at the July Fourth Hot Dog Eating Contest in 2015. Chestnut reclaimed the title in 2016 and would go on to win until 2024 when he was banned from competing in that year's contest. He would reclaim it in 2025 and win it again in 2026.

== TV ratings ==
The ESPN2 telecast of the 2014 Nathan's event generated a 1.6 rating and 2.8 million viewers, making it the most watched telecast in the contest's history. The ESPN2 airing also ranks as the 6th highest-rated and 5th most-watched telecast of the year on ESPN2, behind NCAA Football, the NBA and the World Cup.

In 2020, the contest was forced to change its format due to the coronavirus pandemic. As a result, the ratings declined significantly, with the number of viewers dropping below 1 million, even though it was the first professional sport to return during the pandemic.

== See also ==
- Major League Eating: The Game
