= Erik the Red (disambiguation) =

Erik the Red (c. 950 – c. 1003) was a Viking explorer.

Erik the Red may also refer to:

- Erik Denmark (born about 1980), a competitive eater nicknamed Erik "The Red" Denmark
- Eric the Red (album), by Týr
- Erik the Red (wrestler), the ring name of Ib Solvang Hansen (1934–1978)
- Erik the Red's Land, an area on the coast of eastern Greenland
- Saga of Erik the Red, a 13th-century account of Norse exploration in the North Atlantic
- Erik the Red, a fictional Shi'ar character in Marvel Comics
