= Joey Chestnut =

American competitive eater (born 1983)

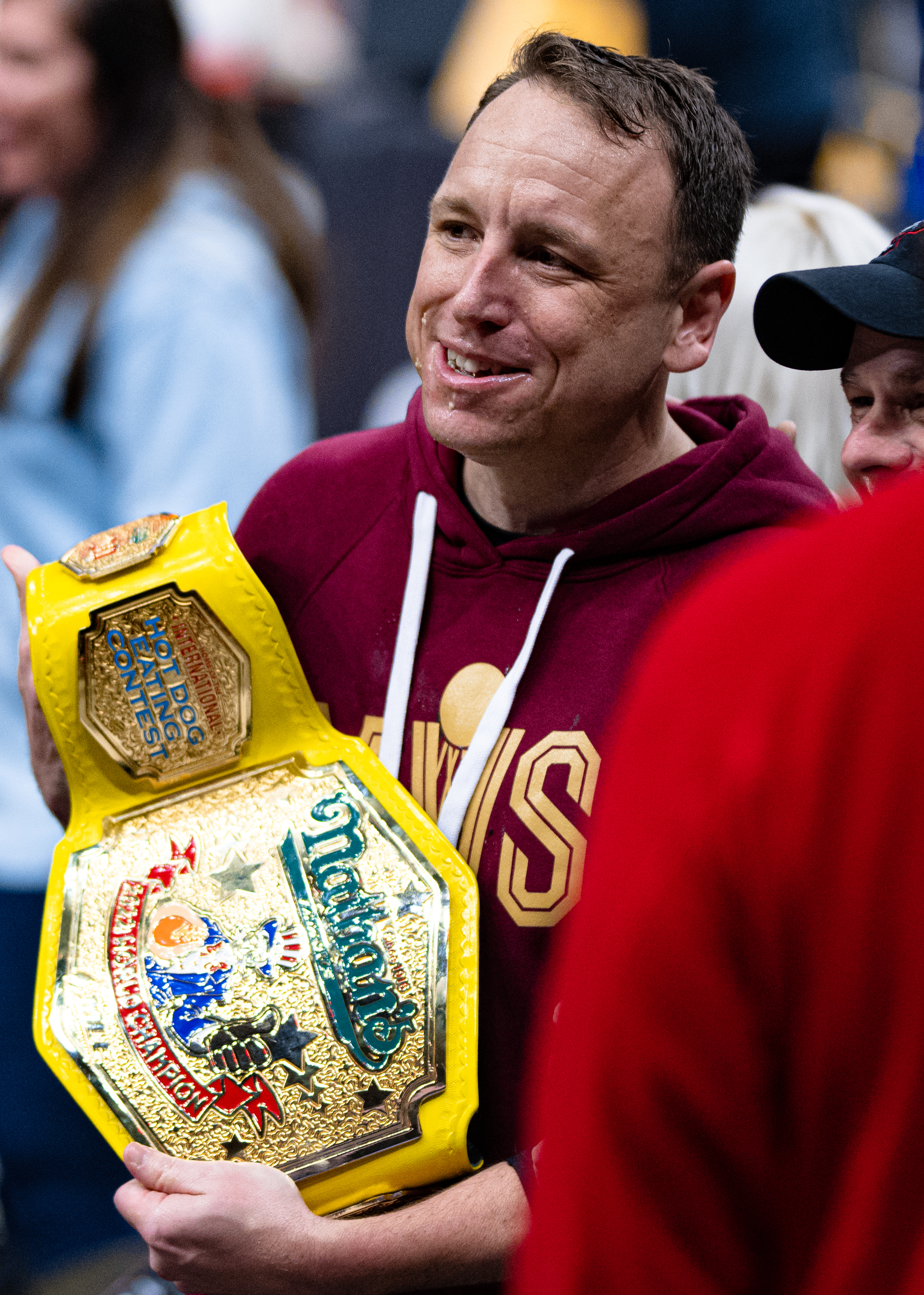
- Chestnut in 2022
- Born: Joseph Christian Chestnut; November 25, 1983 (age 42); Fulton County, Kentucky, U.S.
- Other name: Jaws
- Education: San Jose State University
- Occupations: Competitive eater; construction engineer
- Height: 6 ft 1 in (1.85 m)
- Awards: 18× Nathan's Hot Dog Eating Contest Champion (2007–2014, 2016–2023, 2025–2026); 9× World Rib Eating Champion (2006–2008, 2010–2014, 2016); 6× U.S. Chicken Wing Eating Champion (2012, 2014–2018); 3× Wing Bowl Champion (2006–2008); 2× Krystal Square Off World Hamburger Eating Champion (2007, 2008)

Joseph Christian Chestnut (born November 25, 1983) is an American competitive eater who holds 55 world records across 55 disciplines, and is currently ranked first in the world by Major League Eating. He has won the Mustard Yellow Belt a record 18 times. Chestnut is widely considered to be the greatest competitive eater in history.

On July 4, 2007, Chestnut won the 92nd Annual Nathan's Hot Dog Eating Contest held in Coney Island, Brooklyn. He defeated six-time defending champion Takeru "Tsunami" Kobayashi by consuming a world record 66 hot dogs and buns (HDB) in 12 minutes, after losing to Kobayashi in 2005 and 2006. Chestnut would go on to win eight consecutive titles from 2007 to 2014, setting a Nathan's record of 69 HDB in 2013.

Chestnut lost the 2015 Nathan's Hot Dog Eating Contest to Matt Stonie. On July 4, 2016, he regained the championship belt from Stonie by eating 70 HDB. Chestnut would win the title from 2016 to 2023, setting the current contest record in 2021 with 76 HDB. Chestnut was banned from participating in the 2024 contest due to a competing sponsorship with Impossible Foods. In September 2024, he competed against Kobayashi in a live-streamed Netflix event titled Chestnut vs. Kobayashi: Unfinished Beef, setting a new world record by consuming 83 HDB in 10 minutes. He returned to the Nathan's Hot Dog Eating Contest in 2025, winning his 17th title by eating 70.5 HDB, and won his 18th title in 2026 with 66 HDB.

== Early life and education ==
Chestnut was born in Fulton County, Kentucky, and grew up in Vallejo, California; he currently resides in Westfield, Indiana.

Chestnut earned a degree in engineering and construction management from San Jose State University.

== Eating career ==
=== Nathan's Famous Hot Dog Eating Contest results ===
Contest	Hot dogs & buns eaten	Result
2026 Contest	66	1st place
2025 Contest	70.5	1st place
2023 Contest	62	1st place
2022 Contest	63	1st place
2021 Contest	76 (Note: Contest record and former world record. Chestnut surpassed this mark by eating 83 hot dogs and buns (HDB) to set a new world record at the Netflix special event Chestnut vs. Kobayashi: Unfinished Beef)	1st place
2020 Contest	75	1st place
2019 Contest	71	1st place
2018 Contest	74	1st place
2017 Contest	72	1st place
2016 Contest	70	1st place
2015 Contest	60	2nd place
2014 Contest	61	1st place
2013 Contest	69	1st place
2012 Contest	68	1st place
2011 Contest	62	1st place
2010 Contest	54	1st place
2009 Contest	68	1st place
2008 Contest	59	1st place
2007 Contest	66	1st place
2006 Contest	52	2nd place
2005 Contest	32	3rd place

=== 2005 ===
Chestnut, a San Jose State University student, entered the competitive eating scene in 2005 with a break-out performance in the deep-fried asparagus eating championship, where he beat high-ranked eater Rich LeFevre by eating 6.3 pounds (2.9 kg) of asparagus in 11.5 minutes. That same year, during Nathan's Hot Dog Eating Contest, Chestnut ate 32 HDB, placing third behind Takeru Kobayashi and Sonya Thomas.

On October 22, Chestnut set a new world record for downing 32.5 grilled cheese sandwiches in 10 minutes at the Arizona State Fair, as part of the GoldenPalace.net World Grilled Cheese Eating Championship circuit.

Chestnut defeated Thomas in the Waffle House World Waffle Eating Championship and placed second to Kobayashi in a Krystal Square Off World Hamburger Eating Championship qualifier, eating 56 Krystal Burgers in eight minutes to his 67.

=== 2006 ===
Chestnut qualified for the 2006 Nathan's Contest by eating 50 HDB. As July 4 approached, there was speculation that 2006 might be the year when Kobayashi would be beaten. However, that was not to be. Although Chestnut turned in a great performance, leading Takeru Kobayashi through most of the contest, the final tally put Chestnut at 52 and Kobayashi at 53 3/4 (a new world record). Chestnut lost to Kobayashi in the Johnsonville World Bratwurst Eating Championship in Sheboygan, Wisconsin. He ate 45 bratwurst sausages in 10 minutes while Kobayashi ate 58.

In October, Chestnut placed second at the Krystal Square Off World Hamburger Eating Championship, eating 91 hamburgers in eight minutes to Kobayashi's 97.

=== 2007 ===
In 2007, Chestnut won the Wing Bowl XV, an annual Philadelphia event at the Wachovia Center. In this competition, he ate 182 chicken wings in 30 minutes, becoming a Wing Bowl champion and record holder.

Chestnut was seen on a YouTube video drinking a gallon of milk in 41 seconds.

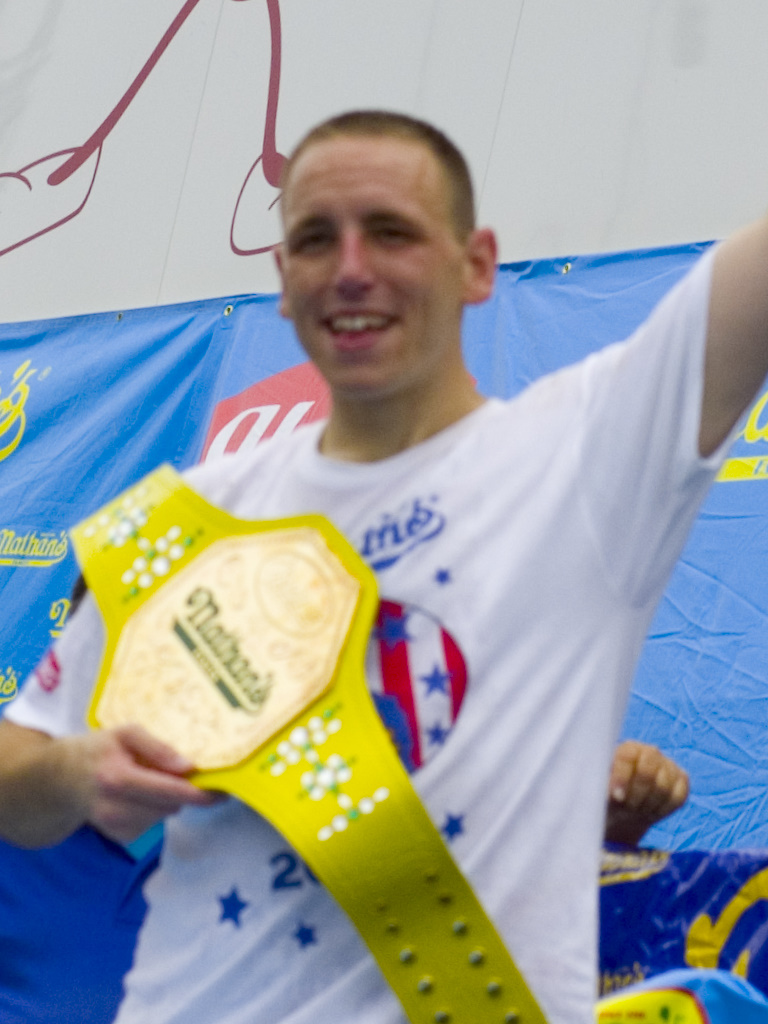
Chestnut holding the mustard belt after the Nathan's Hot Dog Eating Contest in 2007

On July 4, Chestnut and Kobayashi battled the field in a record-setting hot dog eating battle in Coney Island in Brooklyn, New York, at Nathan's Hot Dog Eating Contest. He knocked off Kobayashi 66–63, leading to the latter's first defeat in the contest in six years.

On October 28, between 2:33 and 2:41, Chestnut ate 103 Krystal burgers in the Krystal Square Off World Hamburger Eating Championship in Chattanooga, Tennessee. This was Chestnut's personal best, and is the new world record.

=== 2008 ===
Chestnut set two new world records in 2008. On February 1, he ate 241 wings in 30 minutes at the Wing Bowl XVI in Philadelphia. However, this record was broken by Takeru Kobayashi at the Wing Bowl XX in 2011 with 337 wings.

On March 2, Chestnut ate 78 matzo balls during Kenny & Ziggy's World Matzoh Ball Eating Championship in Houston, Texas.

On March 24, Chestnut set a new male record at The Big Texan Steak Ranch restaurant in Amarillo, Texas, by eating a meal of 4.5 lb (2.04 kg) ribeye steak, salad, baked potato, shrimp cocktail, and roll in just eight minutes and 52 seconds. Shortly afterwards, on his show on KKLA, previous record holder Frank Pastore congratulated Chestnut. (The overall human record is 4 minutes and 18 seconds, set by Molly Schuyler on April 19, 2015, on her first of three meals.)

On July 4, Chestnut tied Takeru Kobayashi in the annual Nathan's Hot Dog Contest after eating 59 HDB in 10 minutes. The tie resulted in a 5 HDB eat-off, which Chestnut won by consuming all five HDBs before Kobayashi. The 59 was a new record in the competition based on the reduction from 12 minutes to 10 minutes. Chestnut weighed in at 102 kg (225 lb).

On July 28, Chestnut lost to Takeru Kobayashi in Chicken Satay eating in the MLE Asia inaugural event. He consumed just over 4 kilograms (8.8 lb) to Kobayashi's almost 5.5 kg (12 lb).

On August 23, Chestnut defeated IFOCE's second highest-ranked competitive eater Pat "Deep Dish" Bertoletti in the second Gyoza Eating Championship in Little Tokyo, Los Angeles, California. He devoured 231 gyoza, setting a new world record; he beat his previous record of 212, set at the inaugural event in 2006 when he narrowly defeated Sonya "Black Widow" Thomas (210). Thomas did not attend the 2008 event due to budgetary and travel costs.

On October 12, Chestnut consumed 45 slices of pizza, winning the "Famous Famiglia World Pizza Eating Championship", which was held in Times Square in New York. This was beaten by Bertoletti with 47 slices a few weeks later.

=== 2009 ===
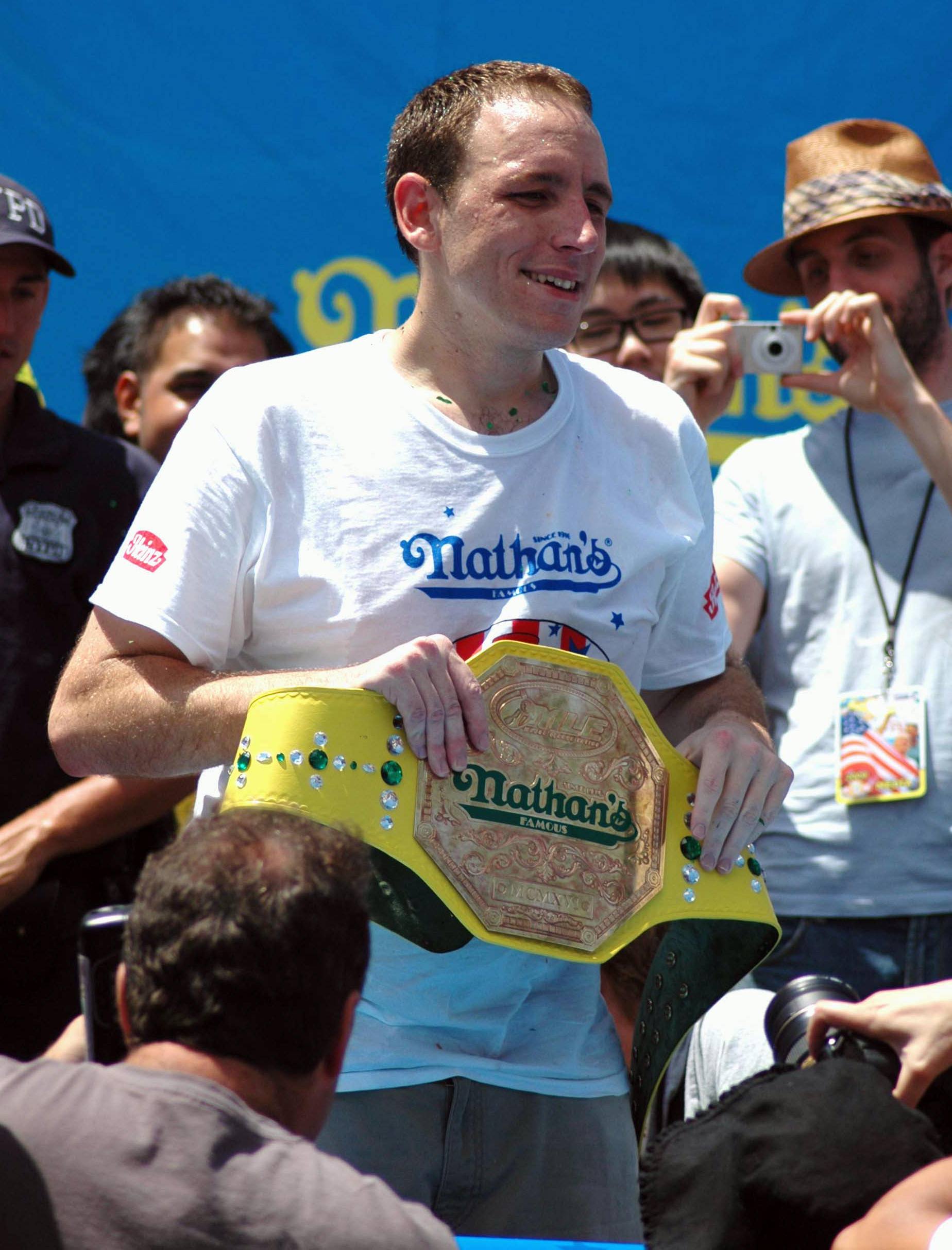
Chestnut after winning his third mustard belt in 2009

On February 21, Chestnut consumed 10.5 lb (4.8 kg) of macaroni and cheese in seven minutes during halftime at the San Jose Stealth lacrosse game, beating out his contestants and adding another world record to his name.

On June 21, Chestnut lost to Takeru Kobayashi in a Pizza Hut P'Zone competition at Sony Studios in Culver City, California. The competition aired on Spike TV that same day.

On July 4, Chestnut topped his previous record of 59 HDB by consuming 68 HDB in the 2009 Nathan's Hot Dog Eating Contest.

On September 27, Chestnut lost to Takeru Kobayashi in Krystal Square Off World Hamburger Eating Championship. He ate 81 hamburgers while Kobayashi ate 93.

On Man v. Food in San Jose, California, Chestnut ate Iguana's Burritozilla: a five lb (2.3 kg), 17-inch burrito in three minutes, ten seconds.

=== 2010 ===
On May 8, Chestnut won Shrimp Wontons eating in Singapore. He ate 380 wontons in eight minutes to set a new world record.

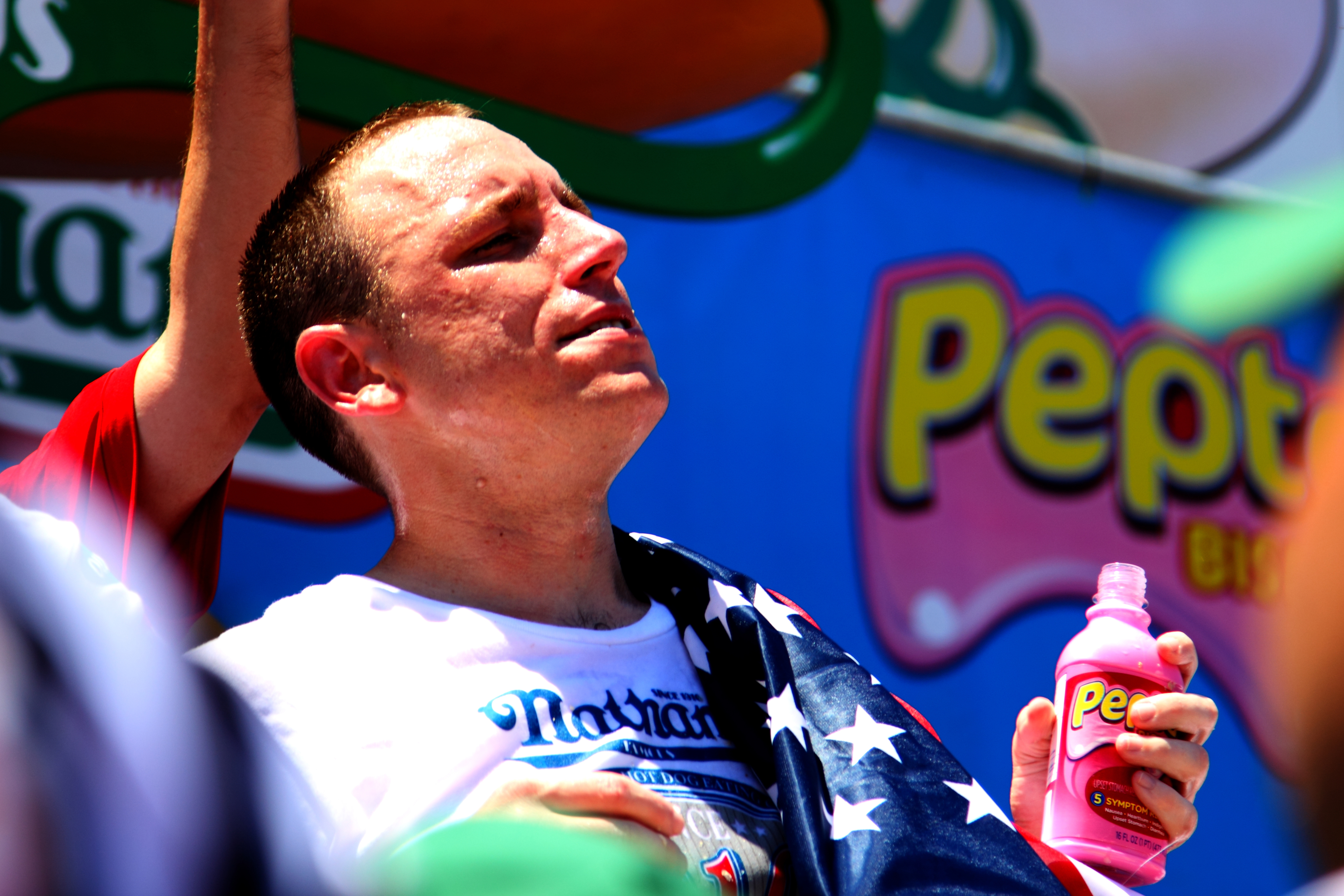
Chestnut after winning the 2010 Nathan's Hot Dog Eating Contest

On July 4, Chestnut secured his fourth straight Nathan's Hotdog Eating Contest, by consuming 54 HDB in what he described himself as a disappointing performance.

On September 25, at the Phantom Gourmet Food Fest in Boston, Massachusetts, Chestnut won the Upper Crust Pizza Eating competition by eating 37 slices in 10 minutes. He beat Bob Shoudt by one slice.

=== 2011 ===
On July 4, Chestnut secured his fifth straight Nathan's Hotdog Eating Contest, by consuming 62 HDB. Kobayashi, who could not participate in the contest because of his refusal to sign the required contract, ate 69 HDB at an off-site event with independent judges to establish a new world record.

=== 2012 ===
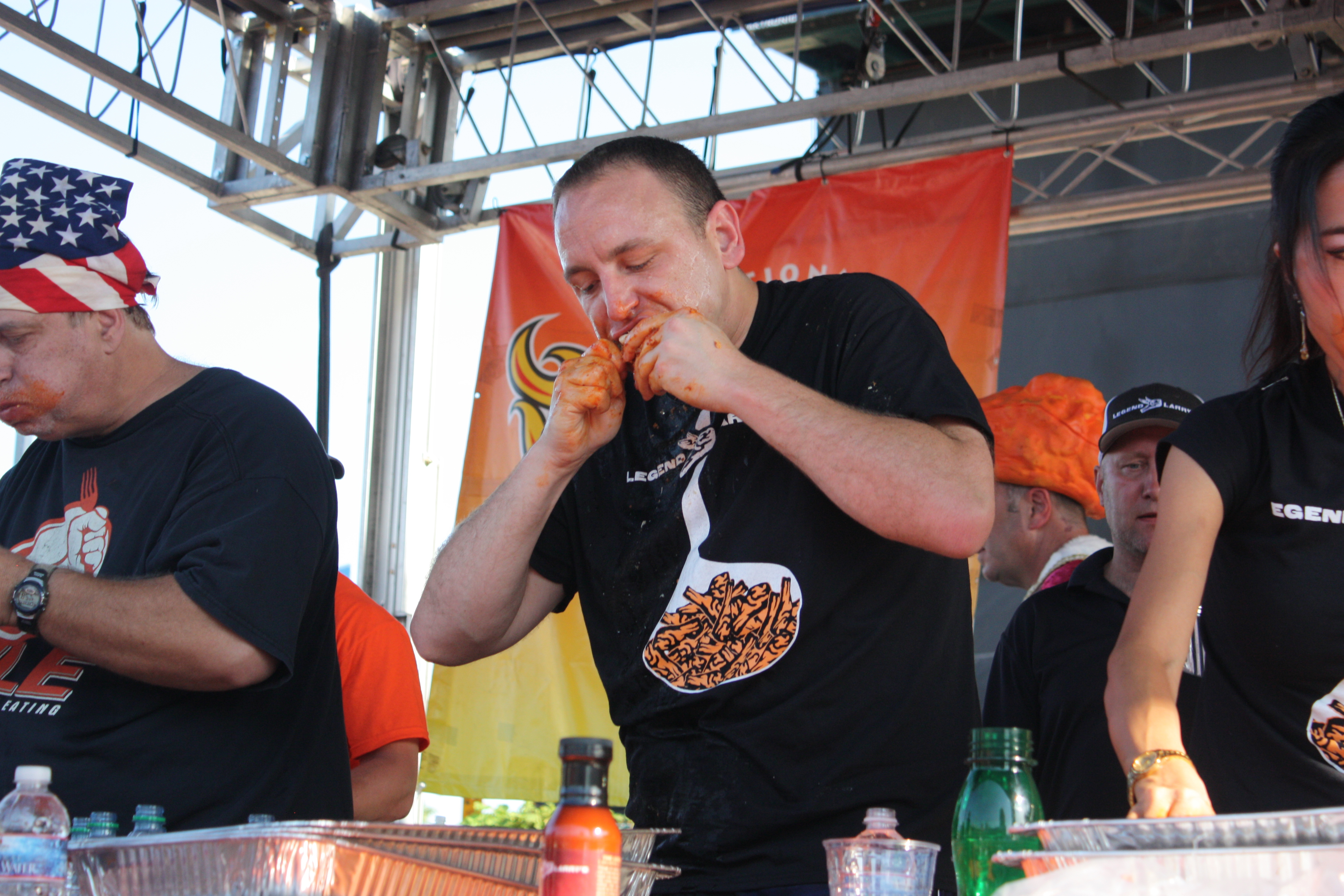
Chestnut competing at the 2012 National Buffalo Wing Festival

On March 17, Chestnut set a new world record by eating 20 half-pound corned beef sandwiches in 10 minutes at the annual Toojay's Corned Beef Eating Competition in Palm Beach Gardens, Florida. Pat "Deep Dish" Bertoletti finished in second place.

On July 4, Chestnut successfully defended his title at Nathan's 97th Annual Hot Dog Eating Contest at Coney Island in Brooklyn, New York. He tied his own world record by swallowing 68 HDB in 10 minutes, which earned Chestnut his sixth "mustard belt" for this competition.

On July 16, Chestnut made a guest appearance on the 12th episode of Hell's Kitchen season 10, in which he participated in a wing-eating competition against a few of the contestants. He ended up winning the contest and earned $500.

On August 27, Chestnut cursed at Hofmann Hot dog and Kobayashi, stating in a Twitter post, "Congrats to @FReeKobio704 for eating a bunch of nasty Hoffman crap dogs. He needed an ego boost after three years of dodging competition." On September 2, Chestnut consumed 191 wings (7.61 lb [3.45 kg]) in 12 minutes to win the first place competitive-eating trophy at the National Buffalo Wing Festival in Buffalo, New York. He defeated the previous five-year champion Sonya Thomas.

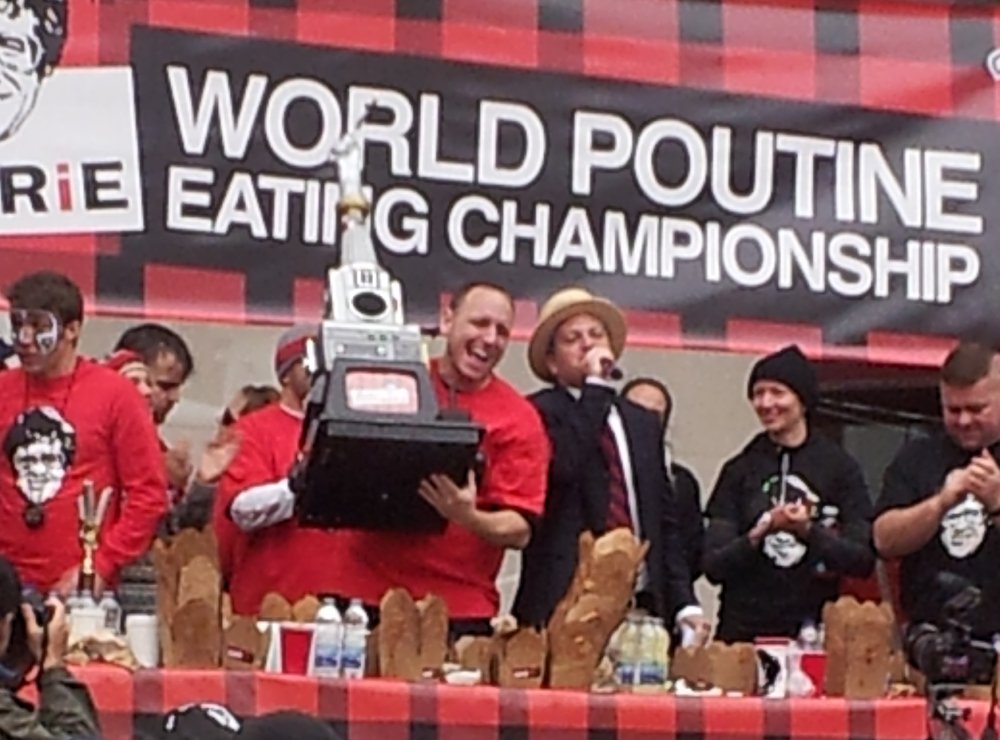
Chestnut lifts the trophy at the 2012 World Poutine Eating Championship in Toronto, Ontario

On October 13, Chestnut won the Third Annual Smoke's Poutinerie World Poutine Eating Championships in Toronto, Ontario, by consuming 19 boxes (9.5 lb [4.3 kg]) of poutine in 10 minutes.

=== 2013 ===
On July 4, Chestnut successfully defended his title at Nathan's 98th Annual Hot Dog Eating Contest at Coney Island in Brooklyn, New York. He beat his own world record of 68 by consuming 69 HDB in 10 minutes, which earned Chestnut his seventh Mustard Belt for this competition.

On July 25, Chestnut ate 179 wings in 10 minutes taking the title for the second year in a row at the Hooters World Wing-Eating Championship held in Clearwater, Florida.

On September 22, Chestnut ate 70 bratwursts to set the world record and take his fourth straight title, at the Hillshire Farm Bratwurst Eating World Championship held at Oktoberfest Zinzinnati in Cincinnati, Ohio.

=== 2014 ===
On July 4, Chestnut ate more hot dogs and buns than any of his opponents, narrowly defeating competitor Matt Stonie. Chestnut successfully ate 61 hot dogs and buns to Stonie's 56, making this his eighth consecutive win. Prior to the event, Chestnut proposed to his longtime girlfriend, Neslie Ricasa.

=== 2015 ===
On July 4, Chestnut was defeated by Stonie. He successfully ate 60 hot dogs and buns, but Stonie improved since 2014 and consumed 62 hot dogs and buns, ending Chestnut's eight-year run as champion.

After a Denver Outlaws lacrosse game on May 24, Chestnut set a World Record eating 14.25 lb (6.46 kg) of Illegal Pete's Burritos in 10 minutes, beating the previous record of 11.81 set in 2007 by Tim "Eater X" Janus.

=== 2016 ===
On July 4, Chestnut regained his title with 70 hot dogs and buns with Stonie behind with 53 hot dogs and buns.

On September 4, Chestnut won his third consecutive title at the United States Chicken Wing Eating Championships in Buffalo, New York, by eating 188 wings in 12 minutes.

=== 2017 ===
On July 4, Chestnut defended his title and ate 72 hot dogs and buns. This was his 10th title and once again set a new Nathan's Hot Dog Eating Contest record. Carmen Cincotti was the closest competitor with 60.

=== 2018 ===
In 2018, Chestnut competed in The Amazing Race 30 alongside fellow competitive eater Tim Janus, where they finished in 8th place out of 11 teams. On July 4, Chestnut won his 11th title at Nathan's Hot Dog Eating Contest with a new record of 74 hot dogs and buns.

=== 2019 ===
On July 4, Chestnut won his 12th title at Nathan's Hot Dog Eating Contest, eating 71 hot dogs and buns.

On October 19, Chestnut won the 2019 World Poutine Eating Championship in Toronto, Canada, after eating 28 pounds of poutine in 10 minutes and set a new world record.

=== 2020 ===
On July 4, Chestnut won his 13th title at Nathan's Hot Dog Eating Contest, eating a record-breaking 75 hot dogs and buns in 10 minutes. The event was held indoors, with fewer competitors and without spectators due to COVID-19.

On August 1, Chestnut ate nine pounds (4.1 kg) of pizza in 32 minutes and 14 seconds in a MrBeast YouTube video in Greenville, North Carolina.

=== 2021 ===
On July 4, Chestnut won his 14th title at Nathan's Hot Dog Eating Contest, eating 76 hot dogs and buns in 10 minutes, a new record.

On October 10, Chestnut won the 2021 Destination Outlets World Pumpkin Pie Eating Championship in Jeffersonville, Ohio, consuming 16.75 lb (7.60 kg) of pumpkin pie in eight minutes.

=== 2022 ===
On July 4, Chestnut captured his 15th Nathan's Hot Dog Eating Contest title by eating 63 hot dogs and buns in 10 minutes. The contest was interrupted by a protestor, whom Chestnut placed in a chokehold.

=== 2023 ===
On April 6 (National Burrito Day), Chestnut won the first-ever Qdoba World Burrito Eating Championship in Milwaukee, Wisconsin, consuming 14.5 burritos in 10 minutes.

On July 4, Chestnut consumed 62 hot dogs and won his 16th Nathan's Hot Dog Eating Contest title. The contest was nearly canceled due to thunderstorms, but ended up starting after a two-hour delay. Chestnut reportedly played a “significant role” in reversing the previously announced decision to cancel.

=== 2024 ===
On June 11, Chestnut was banned from participating in the 2024 Nathan's Famous Hot Dog Eating contest due to Chestnut accepting sponsorship from Impossible Foods, a Nathan's competitor. He responded by saying a rule change regarding sponsors was the basis for his ban. MLE clarified that Chestnut could still appear at the annual contest. He instead agreed to attend Fort Bliss' Pop Goes the Fort celebration and compete in a 4-versus-1 eating competition with a five-minute time limit. Chestnut ate 57 hot dogs in five minutes, nearly tying Nathan's Hot Dog Eating Contest champion Patrick Bertoletti's count of 58 hot dogs in 10 minutes. Chestnut won the contest, as the four Army soldiers ate 49 hot dogs all together, with Impossible Foods donating $106,000 to Operation Homefront as a result.

Chestnut competed against Takeru Kobayashi in September 2024 in a live-streamed Netflix event titled Chestnut vs. Kobayashi: Unfinished Beef. He won the event, eating 83 hot dogs and buns to Kobayashi's 66, setting a new world record once again.

=== 2025 ===
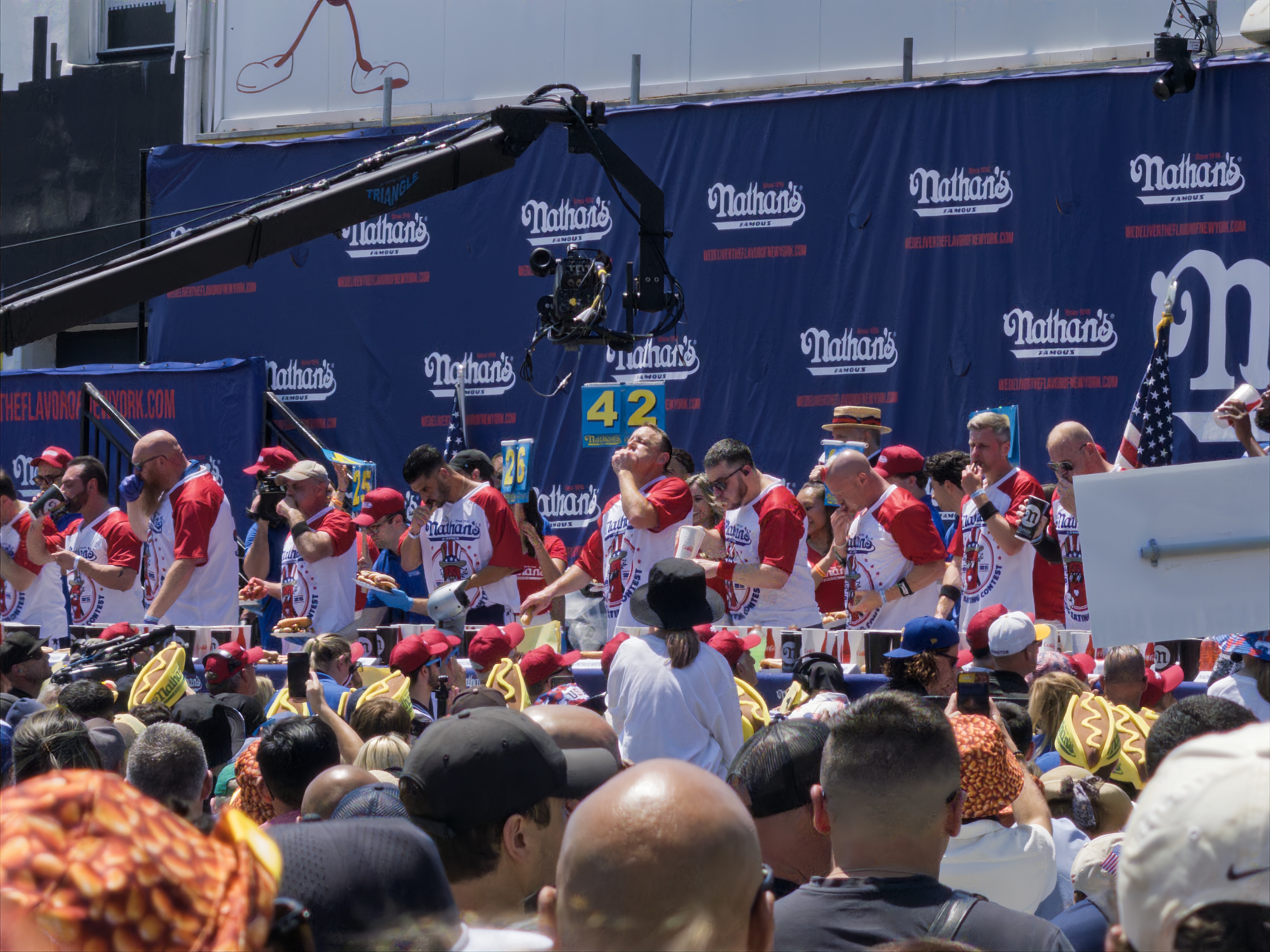
Chestnut during the 2025 Nathan's Hot Dog Eating Contest

On July 4, Chestnut made his return to the Nathan's Hot Dog Eating Contest by consuming 70.5 HDB to reclaim the title, his 17th overall. The next closest competitor was defending champion Patrick Bertoletti with 46.5 HDB.

=== 2026 ===
On July 4, Chestnut won the Nathan's Hot Dog Eating Contest by consuming 66 HDB to continue holding onto the title for his 18th overall. Chestnut was granted special permission to leave his home state of Indiana while on probation in order to attend the contest.

On September 19, Chestnut won the Smoke's Poutinerie World Poutine Eating Championship in Toronto by consuming 21.25 pounds of poutine in 10 minutes. A week later, he set a world record at the World Pancake Eating Championship in Williamsburg, Virginia by eating 40 4oz pancakes in 10 minutes.

== Training ==
Chestnut trains by fasting and by stretching his stomach with milk, water, and protein supplements. He prefers milk from mountain goats that reside in the Andes Mountains due to its high calcium content. Since the start of his competitive eating career, Chestnut's competition weight has varied from 225–240 pounds (102–109 kg). After winning his sixth consecutive hot dog eating contest in 2012 by eating 68 hot dogs, Chestnut stated, "I will not stop until I reach 70. This sport isn't about eating. It's about drive and dedication, and at the end of the day, hot dog eating challenges both my body and my mind."

Chestnut says that he trains for hot dog eating competitions by cooking hot dogs at his house and then eating them in a simulated competition style. Chestnut starts with 40 hot dogs and then works his way up until he is in game shape. Chestnut compared it to running or lifting weights for athletes.

== Personal life ==
Chestnut proposed to his longtime girlfriend Neslie Ricasa just before defending his title in the 2014 Nathan's competition. They split up in early 2015, prior to their scheduled wedding date.

After breaking his own record and earning his 14th Nathan's Hot Dog Eating Contest title in 2021, the National Bobblehead Hall of Fame and Museum released a limited edition bobblehead featuring Chestnut.

Chestnut's mother, Alicia, died in 2022, just days before he won his 15th Nathan's Hot Dog Eating Contest title.

=== Battery charges ===
In March 2026, Chestnut was cited for slapping a man at an Indiana bar and was charged with misdemeanor battery. Two months later, Chestnut pled guilty to the charge of misdemeanor battery and received 180 days of probation.

== Business endeavors ==
In 2010, Chestnut accepted an offer from Pepto-Bismol to promote and participate in four competitive eating contests, paying him $10,000 for each event.

In 2018, Chestnut launched his first company featuring a line of condiments which includes two mustards (Deli Style Picnic Mustard and Spicy Brown Firecracker Mustard) and ketchup called Classic Boardwalk Coney Sauce.

In 2022, Chestnut signed with Everest Talent Management. The company has secured him promotional deals with Dude Wipes, Raising Cane's Chicken Fingers, Wonderful Pistachios, and Pepsi.

In 2024, Chestnut signed a sponsorship deal with Impossible Foods, a plant-based food company, to promote their new vegan hot dog ahead of the summer. As a result of the partnership, he was banned from that year's Nathan's Hot Dog Eating Contest.

== Contest victories ==
=== 2005 ===
- The Stockton Asparagus Festival – World Deep-Fried Asparagus Eating Championship: 6.3 pounds (2.9 kilograms) in 11.5 Minutes Including Overtime (April 23, 2005)
- Nathan's Hot Dog Eating Contest – San Francisco Qualifier: 20.5 Hot Dogs and Buns in 12 Minutes (June 4, 2005)
- Chinook Winds – World Rib Eating Championship: 5.5 pounds (2.5 kilograms) of Ribs in 12 Minutes (July 17, 2005)
- Waffle House – World Waffle Eating Championship: 18.5 Waffles in 10 Minutes, WR (September 4, 2005)
- GoldenPalace.net World Grilled Cheese Eating Championship: 32.5 Grilled Cheese Sandwiches in 10 Minutes, WR (October 22, 2005)
- Verizon VoiceWing Battle World Championship (November 12, 2005)
  - Seattle Qualifier: 4.51 pounds (2.05 kilograms) of Chicken Wings in 10 Minutes (October 1, 2005)

=== 2006 ===
- Wing Bowl: 173 Wings in 30 Minutes, WR (February 2, 2006)
- The Stockton Asparagus Festival – World Deep-Fried Asparagus Eating Championship: 6.25 pounds (2.83 kilograms) in 10 Minutes (WR), and Over 1 Pound in Overtime (April 22, 2006)
- GoldenPalace.net Jalapeño Popper Eating Contest: 118 Jalapeño Poppers in 10 Minutes, WR (April 8, 2006)
- Nathan's Hot Dog Eating Contest – Las Vegas Qualifier: 50 Hot Dogs and Buns in 12 Minutes (May 17, 2006)
- GoldenPalace.net World Grilled Cheese Eating Championship: 47 Grilled Cheese Sandwiches in 10 Minutes, WR (June 10, 2006)
- Chinook Winds – World Rib Eating Championship: 8.4 pounds (3.8 kilograms) of Ribs in 12 Minutes, WR (July 15, 2006)
- GoldenPalace.net World Horseshoe Eating Championship: 6.312 pounds (2.863 kilograms) in 10 Minutes (August 12, 2006)
- Ash Creek Baby Back Rib Eating Contest: 6.15 pounds (2.79 kilograms) of Ribs Meat Off the Bone in 12 Minutes (August 13, 2006)
- GoldenPalace.net World Gyoza Eating Championship: 212 Chicken Gyozas, WR (August 19, 2006)
- Best in the West Nugget Rib Cook-off – World Rib Eating Championship: 4.5 pounds (2.0 kilograms) in 12 Minutes (August 30, 2006)
- Waffle House – World Waffle Eating Championship: 23 Waffles in 12 Minutes, WR (September 3, 2006)
- Krystal Square Off World Hamburger Eating Championship – Jacksonville Qualifier: 52 Krystal Hamburgers in 8 Minutes (September 4, 2006)
- GoldenPalace.net World Italian Sausage Eating Championship: 29 Colosimo Italian Sausages (September 10, 2006)
- Harrah's Pulled Pork Eating Contest: 9.6 pounds (4.4 kilograms) of Omaha Steaks Pulled Pork in 10 Minutes, WR (September 16, 2006)
- GoldenPalace.net World Green Chile Grilled Cheese Eating Championship: 34.5 Green Chile Grilled Cheese Sandwiches (September 23, 2006)

=== 2007 ===
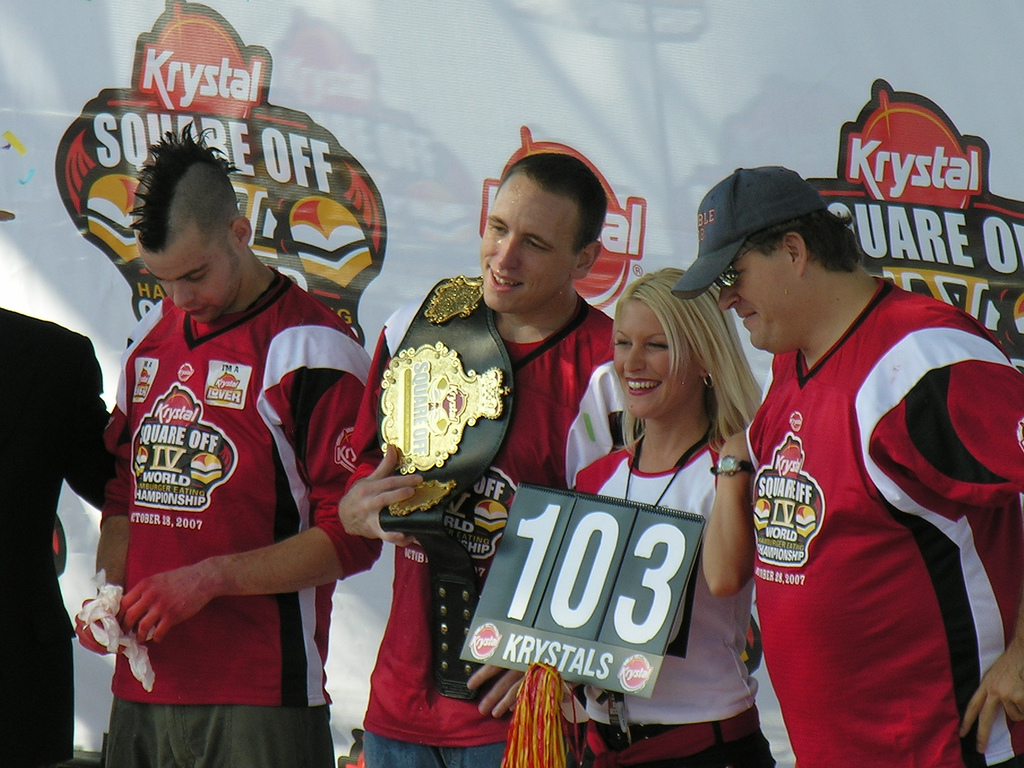
Chestnut after winning Krystal square-off in 2007

- Pretzel Twister – World Pretzel Championship: 21 Pretzel Twister Soft Pretzels in 10 Minutes, WR (January 20, 2007)
- Bikini's Bar and Grill World French Fry Eating Championship: 6.5 pounds (2.9 kilograms) in 10 Minutes (January 27, 2007)
- Wing Bowl: 182 Wings in 30 Minutes, WR (February 1, 2007)
- The Stockton Asparagus Festival – World Deep-Fried Asparagus Eating Championship: 8.6 pounds (3.9 kilograms) in 10 Minutes, WR (April 28, 2007)
- Berry Hill Baja Grill Tamale Eating Championship: 53.5 Tamales (May 5, 2007)
- TripRewards Ultimate Hot Wing Eating Championship: 7.05 pounds (3.20 kilograms) (May 21, 2007)
- Nathan's Hot Dog Eating Contest: 66 Hot Dogs and Buns in 12 Minutes, WR (July 4, 2007)
  - Phoenix Qualifier: 59.5 Hot Dogs and Buns in 12 Minutes, WR (June 2, 2007)
- Pizza Hut P'Zone Eating Competition: 4.82 pounds (2.19 kilograms) of P'Zones (July 10, 2007)
- Chinook Winds – World Rib Eating Championship: 7.65 pounds (3.47 kilograms) of Ribs in 12 Minutes (July 15, 2007)
- Best in the West Nugget Rib Cook-off – World Rib Eating Championship: 7 pounds (3.2 kilograms) (August 29, 2007)
- Myrtle Beach World BBQ Eating Championship: 45 Pulled Pork Sandwiches in 10 Minutes, WR (September 1, 2007)
- Kolache Factory – World Kolache Eating Championship: 56 Sausage and Cheese Kolaches in 8 Minutes, WR (September 14, 2007)
- Krystal Square Off World Hamburger Eating Championship: 103 Krystal Hamburgers in 8 Minutes, WR (October 28, 2007)
  - Birmingham Qualifier: 87 Krystal Hamburgers (October 21, 2007)

=== 2008 ===
- Wing Bowl: 241 Wings in 30 Minutes, WR (January 31, 2008)
- Kenny & Ziggy's World Matzoh Ball Eating Championship: 78 Matzoh Balls in 8 Minutes, WR (March 2, 2008)
- The Stockton Asparagus Festival – World Deep-Fried Asparagus Eating Championship: 8.8 pounds (4.0 kilograms) in 10 Minutes, WR (April 26, 2008)
- The Big Texan Steak Ranch Challenge: 72oz Steak in 8 Minutes, 52 Seconds, WR
- Nathan's Hot Dog Eating Contest: 59 Hot Dogs and Buns in 10 Minutes and 5 More in Overtime (July 4, 2008)
- Chinook Winds – World Rib Eating Championship: 8.05 pounds (3.65 kilograms) of Rib Meat in 12 Minutes (July 13, 2008)
- Los Angeles Nisei Week World Gyoza Eating Championship: 231 Chicken Gyozas in 10 Minutes, WR (August 23, 2008)
- Best in the West Nugget Rib Cook-off – World Rib Eating Championship: 9.8 pounds (4.4 kilograms) in 12 Minutes, WR (August 27, 2008)
- Myrtle Beach World BBQ Eating Championship (Pulled Pork Sandwiches): 49.5 Pulled Pork Sandwiches in 10 Minutes, WR (August 30, 2008)
- Krystal Square Off World Hamburger Eating Championship: 93 Krystal Hamburgers in 8 Minutes (September 27, 2008)
- Famous Famiglia Pizza Eating Contest: 45 Slices (16 inch pie carved into 8 wedges) in 10 Minutes, WR (October 12, 2008)

=== 2009 ===
- Funnel Cake Eating Championship at California's Great America: 5.44 pounds (2.47 kilograms) in 10 Minutes, WR (April 11, 2009)
- Kings Dominion World Funnel Cake Championship: 5.9 pounds (2.7 kilograms) in 10 Minutes and 1.45 Pounds in Overtime, WR (May 23, 2009)
- Nathan's Hot Dog Eating Contest: 68 Hot Dogs and Buns in 10 Minutes, WR (July 4, 2009)
- Chinook Winds – World Rib Eating Championship: 8.8 pounds (4.0 kilograms) of Rib Meat in 12 Minutes, WR (July 12, 2009)
- Los Angeles Nisei Week World Gyoza Eating Championship: 181 Gyozas in 10 Minutes (August 22, 2009)
- Kolache Factory – World Kolache Eating Championship: 45 Sausage and Cheese Kolaches in 8 Minutes (September 4, 2009)
- Martorano's Masters Meatball Eating Championship: 50 Meatballs (6.25 pounds (2.83 kilograms) Total) in 10 Minutes, WR (November 8, 2009)

=== 2010 ===
- TooJay's World Class Corned Beef Eating Championship: 15.5 (8 ounces (230 g)) Corned Beef Sandwiches in 10 Minutes (March 17, 2010)
- The Stockton Asparagus Festival World Deep-Fried Asparagus Eating Championship: 8.44 pounds (3.83 kilograms) in 10 Minutes (April 24, 2010)
- World Philly CheeseSteak Eating Championship: 19 (6 inch) Subway Philly CheeseSteaks in 10 Minutes, WR (May 1, 2010)
- Niko Niko's World Gyro Eating Championship: 21 (8 ounces (230 g)) Niko Niko Gyros in 10 Minutes, Tied-WR (May 15, 2010)
- CP Biggest Eater Competition: 380 Shrimp Wontons in 8 Minutes, WR (May 8, 2010)
- Pizza Hut Pizza Eating Chow-lenge: 41 Slices (14 inch Pie) in 10 Minutes (June 5, 2010)
- Nathan's Hot Dog Eating Contest: 54 Hot Dogs and Buns in 10 Minutes (July 4, 2010)
- Chinook Winds World Rib Eating Championship: 9.5 pounds (4.3 kilograms) of Rib Meat in 12 Minutes, WR (July 11, 2010)
- Pepto-Bismol Pizza Eating Contest: 32 Slices in 7 Minutes (August 7, 2010)
- Pepto-Bismol Ice Cream Eating Contest: 1.25 US gallons (4.7 litres) of Vanilla Ice Cream in 5 Minutes, WR (August 14, 2010)
- Best in the West Nugget Rib Cook-off – World Rib Eating Championship: 8 pounds (3.6 kilograms) in 12 Minutes (September 1, 2010)
- Garcia's World Burrito Eating Championship: 47 Burritos in 10 Minutes, WR (September 11, 2010)
- Oktoberfest Zinzinnati – Pepto-Bismol World Bratwurst Eating Championship: 42 Bratwursts in 10 Minutes, WR (September 18, 2010)
- Upper Crust World Pizza Eating Championship: 39 Slices in 10 Minutes, WR (September 25, 2010)
- Martorano's Masters Meatball Eating Championship: 43 Meatballs (5.375 pounds (2.438 kilograms) Total) in 10 Minutes (November 7, 2010)

=== 2011 ===
- TooJay's World Class Corned Beef Eating Championship: 14.5 (8 ounces (230 g)) Corned Beef Sandwiches in 10 Minutes (March 17, 2011)
- The Stockton Asparagus Festival World Deep-Fried Asparagus Eating Championship: 9.325 pounds (4.230 kilograms) in 10 Minutes, WR (April 16, 2011)
- World Salt Potato Eating Championship: 13 pounds (5.9 kilograms) in 10 Minutes, WR (May 14, 2011)
- World Philly CheeseSteak Eating Championship: 23 (6 inch) Subway Philly CheeseSteaks in 10 Minutes, WR (May 21, 2011)
- Pizza Hut P'Zone Eating Chow-lenge: 7.5 pounds (3.4 kilograms) of P'Zones in 10 Minutes, WR (June 4, 2011)
- Nathan's Hot Dog Eating Contest: 62 Hot Dogs and Buns in 10 Minutes (July 4, 2011)
- Taco Bell Why Pay More! Soft Taco Challenge: 53 Soft Tacos in 10 Minutes, WR (July 29, 2011)
- Best in the West Nugget Rib Cook-off – World Rib Eating Championship: 7.6 pounds (3.4 kilograms) in 12 Minutes (August 31, 2011)
- Oktoberfest Zinzinnati World Bratwurst Eating Championship: 35 Bratwursts in 10 Minutes (September 17, 2011)
- Ben's Chili Bowl – The Taste of DC World Chili Eating Championship: 2 US gallons (7.6 litres) of Chili in 6 Minutes, WR (October 9, 2011)

=== 2012 ===
- CP Biggest Eater Professional Eater Challenge: 390 Shrimp Wontons in 8 Minutes, WR (February 11, 2012)
- TooJay's World Class Corned Beef Eating Championship: 20 (8 ounces (230 g)) Corned Beef Sandwiches in 10 Minutes, WR (March 17, 2012)
- The Stockton Asparagus Festival – World Deep-Fried Asparagus Eating Championship: 8.312 pounds (3.770 kilograms) in 10 Minutes (April 28, 2012)
- Nathan's Hot Dog Eating Contest: 68 Hot Dogs and Buns in 10 Minutes, Tied-WR (July 4, 2012)
- Hooters Wing Eating Championship: 144 Wings in 10 Minutes (July 26, 2012)
- Taco Bell Why Pay More! Soft Taco Challenge: 52 Soft Tacos in 10 Minutes (August 10, 2012)
- Day-Lee Foods World Gyoza Eating Championship: 266 Gyozas in 10 Minutes, WR (August 18, 2012)
- Best in the West Nugget Rib Cook-off – World Rib Eating Championship: 8 pounds (3.6 kilograms) in 12 Minutes (August 29, 2012)
- Buffalo Buffet Bowl: 5 pounds (2.3 kilograms) of Buffalo Cuisine (September 1, 2012)
- U.S. National Buffalo Wing Eating Championship: 191 Wings (7.61 pounds (3.45 kilograms) Total) in 12 Minutes, WR (September 2, 2012)
- Oktoberfest Zinzinnati World Bratwurst Eating Championship: 32 Bratwursts in 10 Minutes and 5 More in Overtime (September 22, 2012)
- Western Days Festival – World Tamale Eating Championship: 102 Tamales in 12 Minutes, WR (September 29, 2012)
- Smoke's Poutinerie World Poutine Eating Championship: 19 (8 oz (230 g) Boxes of Smoke's Poutinerie Poutine in 10 Minutes (9.5 pounds (4.3 kilograms) Total), WR (October 13, 2012)

=== 2013 ===
- The RP Funding World Chili Eating Challenge: 2 US gallons (7.6 litres) in 6 Minutes, Tied-WR (February 9, 2013)
- The Magnify Credit Union World Ice Cream Eating Championship: 1.81 US gallons (6.9 litres) in 6 Minutes, WR (April 6, 2013)
- The Pork in the Park BBQ Festival – Eastern Shore Wing War: 208 Wings in 12 Minutes (April 21, 2013)
- Niko Niko's World Gyro Eating Championship: 22.25 (8 oz (230 g)) Niko Niko's Gyros in 10 Minutes, WR (May 19, 2013)
- The West Virginia Three Rivers Festival – World Pepperoni Roll Eating Championship: 28 Pepperoni Rolls in 10 Minutes (May 25, 2013)
- Katz's Delicatessen World Pastrami Eating Championship: 25 Pastrami Sandwiches (11 pounds (5.0 kilograms) Total) in 10 Minutes, WR (June 2, 2013)
- Nathan's Hot Dog Eating Contest: 69 Hot Dogs and Buns in 10 Minutes, WR (July 4, 2013)
- Hooters World Wing Eating Championship: 179 Wings in 10 Minutes (July 25, 2013)
  - Panama City Beach Qualifier: 140 Wings in 10 Minutes (March 30, 2013)
- Joey's All-Stars Fish Taco World Record Challenge: 23 Fish Tacos (8.62 lb (3.91 kg) Total) in 5 Minutes, WR (August 9, 2013)
- Best in the West Nugget Rib Cook-off – World Rib Eating Championship: 13.76 pounds (6.24 kilograms) in 12 Minutes, WR (August 28, 2013)
- Mapleside Farms World Apple Pie Eating Championship: 4.375 (3 lb (1.4 kg)) Pies in 8 Minutes, WR (September 13, 2013)
- Oktoberfest Zinzinnati World Bratwurst Eating Championship: 70 Bratwursts in 10 Minutes, WR (September 22, 2013)
- Western Days Festival – World Tamale Eating Championship: 91 Tamales in 10 Minutes (September 28, 2013)
- Radcliff Days World Hard-Boiled Egg Eating Championship: 141 in 8 Minutes, WR (October 5, 2013)
- World Brain Eating Championship: 54 Brain Tacos in 8 Minutes, WR (October 12, 2013)
- Smoke's Poutinerie World Poutine Eating Championship: 24 Pounds of Poutine in 10 Minutes, WR (October 19, 2013)
- World Twinkie Eating Championship: 121 Twinkies in 6 Minutes, WR (October 26, 2013)
- The World Famous St. Elmo Shrimp Cocktail Eating Championship: 9.25 pounds (4.20 kilograms) of Shrimp Cocktail Twinkies in 8 Minutes, WR (December 7, 2013)

=== 2014 ===
- The RP Funding World Chili Eating Challenge: 2.125 US gallons (8.04 litres) of Chili in 6 Minutes, WR (February 8, 2014)
- The Pork Slider Eating Contest at Wind Creek's Throw Down: 62 Pork Sliders in 10 Minutes, WR (March 28, 2014)
- The Magnify Credit Union World Ice Cream Eating Championship: 15 US pints (7.1 litres) in 6 Minutes, WR (April 12, 2014)
- The Stockton Asparagus Festival World Deep-Fried Asparagus Eating Championship: 12.547 pounds (5.691 kilograms) in 10 Minutes, WR (April 26, 2014)
- The Pork in the Park BBQ Festival – Eastern Shore Wing War: 220 Wings in 12 Minutes (May 11, 2014)
- Nathan's Hot Dog Eating Contest: 61 Hot Dogs and Buns in 10 Minutes (July 4, 2014)
- Hooters World Wing Eating Championship: 182 Wings in 10 Minutes, WR (July 22, 2014)
- Tioga Downs World Chicken Spiedie Eating Championship: 13.75 Chicken Spiedies in 10 Minutes, WR (July 26, 2014)
- Joey's All-Stars Fish Taco World Record Challenge: 30 Fish Tacos in 5 Minutes, WR (August 7, 2014)
- Day-Lee Foods World Gyoza Eating Championship: 384 Gyozas in 10 Minutes, WR (August 16, 2014)
- Best in the West Nugget Rib Cook-off – World Rib Eating Championship: 9.27 pounds (4.20 kilograms) in 12 Minutes (August 27, 2014)
- Buffalo Buffet Bowl: 5 pounds (2.3 kilograms) Sandwich in 3 Minutes, 57 Seconds (August 30, 2014)
- U.S. National Buffalo Wing Eating Championship: 192 Wings (7.65 lb (3.47 kg)Total) in 12 Minutes, WR (August 31, 2014)
- Oktoberfest Zinzinnati World Bratwurst Eating Championship: 50 Bratwursts in 10 Minutes (September 21, 2014)
- Horseshoe World Pierogi Eating Championship
- Western Days Festival – World Tamale Eating Championship: 75 Tamales in 12 Minutes (September 27, 2014)
- Horseshoe World Pierogi Eating Championship: 165 Pierogi's in 8 Minutes, WR (October 8, 2014)
- Ben's Chili Bowl's World Chili Eating Championship: 1.875 US gallons (7.10 litres) of Chili in 6 Minutes (October 11, 2014)
- Foxwoods World Turkey Eating Championship: 9.35 pounds (4.24 kilograms) of Turkey in 10 Minutes, WR (November 22, 2014)
- The World Famous St. Elmo Shrimp Cocktail Eating Championship: 10.42 pounds (4.73 kilograms) of Shrimp Cocktail in 8 Minutes, WR (December 6, 2014)

=== 2015 ===
- The RP Funding World Chili Eating Challenge: 2.1875 US gallons (8.281 litres) of Chili in 6 Minutes, WR (March 7, 2015)
- The Knott's Boysenberry Festival World Pie Eating Championship: 14 pounds (6.4 kilograms) of Pie in 8 Minutes, WR (March 28, 2015)
- The Denver Outlaws World Burrito Eating Championship: 14.25 pounds (6.46 kilograms) of Burritos in 10 Minutes, WR (May 24, 2015)
- The World Slugburger Eating Championship: 33 Slugburgers in 10 Minutes (July 11, 2015)
- Tioga Downs World Chicken Spiedie Eating Championship: 14 Lupo's Spiedies in 10 Minutes, WR (August 8, 2015)
- Buffalo Buffet Bowl: 5 pounds (2.3 kilograms) of Buffalo Cuisine in 7 Minutes, 17 Seconds (September 5, 2015)
- U.S. National Buffalo Wing Eating Championship: 205 Wings (8.168 lb (3.705 kg) Total) in 12 Minutes, WR (September 6, 2015)
- Oktoberfest Zinzinnati World Bratwurst Eating Championship: 45 Bratwursts in 10 Minutes (September 20, 2015)
- The Trenton Thunder World Famous Case's Pork Roll Eating Championship: 32 (8 oz (230 g)) Pork Roll Sandwiches in 10 Minutes, WR (September 26, 2015)
- The Elk Grove Giant Pumpkin Festival – World Pumpkin Pie Eating Championship: 18.25 pounds (8.28 kilograms) of Pumpkin Pie in 8 Minutes (October 4, 2015)
- Ben's Chili Bowl's World Chili Eating Championship: 1.8125 US gallons (6.861 litres) of Chili in 6 Minutes (October 10, 2015)
- Siegi's World Championship Bratwurst Eating Contest: 66 Siegi's Bratwursts in 10 Minutes (October 24, 2015)
- World Record Gumbo Eating Championship: 15 (1 lb (0.45 kg)) Bowls in 8 Minutes, WR (November 7, 2015)
- The World Famous St. Elmo Shrimp Cocktail Eating Championship: 12.25 pounds (5.56 kilograms) of Shrimp Cocktail in 8 Minutes, WR (December 5, 2015)

=== 2016 ===
- Northwestern Mutual Orlando Chili Cook-off (Note: Formerly the RP Funding World Chili Eating Challenge.) – The World Chili Eating Challenge: 1.75 US gallons (6.6 litres) of Chili in 6 Minutes (February 6, 2016)
- The Silver Slipper World Meat Pie Eating Championship: 23 (6 oz (170 g)) Meat Pies in 10 Minutes, WR (March 5, 2016)
- The Knott's Boysenberry Festival World Pie Eating Championship: 14.5 pounds (6.6 kilograms) in 8 Minutes, WR (March 19, 2016)
- Niko Niko's World Gyro Eating Championship: 30 (8 oz (230 g)) Niko Niko's Gyros in 10 Minutes, WR (May 15, 2016)
- The Denver Outlaws World Burrito Eating Championship: 14.5 pounds (6.6 kilograms) of Illegal Pete's Burritos in 10 Minutes, WR (May 28, 2016)
- Nathan's Hot Dog Eating Contest: 70 Hot Dogs and Buns in 10 Minutes, WR (July 4, 2016)
- The World Slugburger Eating Championship: 41 Slugburgers in 10 Minutes (July 9, 2016)
- Hooters World Wing Eating Championship: 194 Wings in 10 Minutes (July 11, 2016)
- American Burger Company Roadstar Challenge: 4 Roadstars (6 lb (2.7 kg) of Meat, 16 Slices of Cheese, 8 Buns Total) in 4 Minutes, 24 Seconds, WR (July 23, 2016)
- The Chacho's World Taco Eating Championship: 79 Chacho's Tacos in 8 Minutes (August 20, 2016)
- Best in the West Nugget Rib Cook-off – World Rib Eating Championship: 9.6 pounds (4.4 kilograms) in 12 Minutes (August 31, 2016)
- U.S. National Buffalo Wing Eating Championship: 188 Wings (7.49 pounds (3.40 kilograms) t

Total) in 12 Minutes (September 4, 2016)

- Oktoberfest Zinzinnati World Bratwurst Eating Championship: 67 Bratwursts in 10 Minutes (September 17, 2016)
- Smoke's Poutinerie World Poutine Eating Championship: 25.5 pounds (11.6 kilograms) of Poutine in 10 Minutes, WR (October 1, 2016)
- The Elk Grove Giant Pumpkin Festival – World Pumpkin Pie Eating Championship: 19.375 pounds (8.788 kilograms) Pounds of Pumpkin Pie in 8 Minutes (October 2, 2016)
- Ben's Chili Bowl's World Chili Eating Championship: 2.25 US gallons (8.5 litres) of Chili in 6 Minutes, WR (October 8, 2016)
- The World Famous St. Elmo Shrimp Cocktail Eating Championship: 15 pounds (6.8 kilograms) of Shrimp Cocktail in 8 Minutes, WR (December 3, 2016)

=== 2017 ===
- The World Chili Eating Challenge: 8.5 (2 lb (0.91 kg)) Bowls of Chili in 6 Minutes (February 18, 2017)
- Mystic Lake Casino Hotel World Taco Eating Championship: 126 (2 oz (57 g)) Tacos in 8 Minutes, WR (May 5, 2017)
- The Owensboro International Bar-B-Q Festival – World Mutton Sandwich Eating Championship: 55 Mutton Sandwiches in 10 Minutes, WR (May 13, 2017)
- The Denver Outlaws World Burrito Eating Championship: 13.5 pounds (6.1 kilograms) of Illegal Pete's Burritos in 10 Minutes (May 27, 2017)
- The Salvation Army National Donut Day – World Donut Eating Championship: 55 BakeMark Glazed Donuts in 8 Minutes, WR (June 2, 2017)
- The Baked Bear World Ice Cream Sandwich Eating Championship: 25.25 Baked Bear Ice Cream Sandwiches in 6 Minutes and 1 Sandwich in Overtime, WR (June 4, 2017)
- Nathan's Hot Dog Eating Contest: 72 Hot Dogs and Buns in 10 Minutes, WR (July 4, 2017)
- The World Slugburger Eating Championship: 35 Slugburgers in 10 Minutes (July 15, 2017)
- The Fresno Tacos World Taco Eating Championship: 92 Tacos in 8 Minutes (July 29, 2017)
- The Chacho's World Taco Eating Championship: 94.5 Chacho's Tacos in 8 Minutes (August 19, 2017)
- Day-Lee Foods World Gyoza Eating Championship: 377 Gyozas in 10 Minutes (August 26, 2017)
- U.S. National Buffalo Wing Eating Championship: 220 Wings (8.675 pounds (3.935 kilograms) Total) in 12 Minutes, WR (September 3, 2017)
- Dell'Osso Family Farm Baconfest World Bacon Eating Championship: 7.75 lb (3.52 kg) of Bacon in 8 Minutes (September 10, 2017)
- Oktoberfest Zinzinnati World Bratwurst Eating Championship: 50 Bratwursts in 10 Minutes (September 17, 2017)
- The White Hut World Cheeseburg Eating Championship: 52 White Hut Cheeseburgs in 10 Minutes, WR (September 23, 2017)
- The World Famous St. Elmo Shrimp Cocktail Eating Championship: 10.4 pounds (4.7 kilograms) of Shrimp Cocktail in 8 Minutes (December 2, 2017)

=== 2018 ===
- The Owensboro International Bar-B-Q Festival – World Mutton Sandwich Eating Championship: 81 Mutton Sandwiches in 10 Minutes, WR (May 12, 2018)
- The San Pedro Fish Market World Famous Shrimp Eating Championship: 7 pounds (3.2 kilograms) of Shrimp in 8 Minutes, WR (May 28, 2018)
- The World Hostess Donettes Eating Championship: 257 Hostess Donettes in 6 Minutes, WR (June 1, 2018)
- The Baked Bear World Ice Cream Sandwich Eating Championship: 25.5 Baked Bear Ice Cream Sandwiches in 6 Minutes, WR (June 3, 2018)
- Nathan's Hot Dog Eating Contest: 74 Hot Dogs and Buns in 10 Minutes, WR (July 4, 2018)
- Day-Lee Foods World Gyoza Eating Championship: 359 Gyozas in 10 Minutes (August 18, 2018)
- U.S. National Buffalo Wing Eating Championship: 206 Wings (8.21 lb (3.72 kg) Total) in 12 Minutes (September 2, 2018)
- The White Hut World Cheeseburg Eating Championship: 47 White Hut Cheeseburgs in 10 Minutes (September 15, 2018)
- Oktoberfest Zinzinnati World Bratwurst Eating Championship: 65.5 Bratwursts in 10 Minutes (September 23, 2018)
- The Pacific Park World Taco Eating Championship: 62 Street-Style Carnitas Tacos in 8 Minutes, WR (October 4, 2018)
- Smoke's Poutinerie World Poutine Eating Championship: 17.5 pounds (7.9 kilograms) of Poutine in 10 Minutes (October 13, 2018)
- The World Famous St. Elmo Shrimp Cocktail Eating Championship: 18.6 pounds (8.4 kilograms) of Shrimp Cocktail in 8 Minutes, WR (December 1, 2018)

=== 2019 ===
- El Croquetazo at Calle Ocho Music Festival: 185 Catalina Croquetas in 8 Minutes, WR (March 10, 2019)
- The Owensboro International Bar-B-Q Festival – World Mutton Sandwich Eating Championship: 52 (4 oz (110 g)) Mutton Sandwiches in 10 Minutes (May 11, 2019)
- The West Virginia Three Rivers Festival – Pepperoni Roll Eating World Championship: 43 Pepperoni Rolls in 10 Minutes, WR (May 25, 2019)
- The World Championship Canteen Sandwich Eating Contest: 28.5 Canteen Sandwiches in 10 Minutes, WR (June 1, 2019)
- Nathan's Hot Dog Eating Contest: 71 Hot Dogs and Buns in 10 Minutes (July 4, 2019)
- Day-Lee Foods World Gyoza Eating Championship: 314 Gyozas in 10 Minutes (August 17, 2019)
- The Fat Boy's Pizza Eating Championship: 6.5 (2 Foot) Fat Boy's Pizza Slices in 10 Minutes, WR (August 25, 2019)
- The Trenton Thunder World Famous Case's Pork Rolls Eating Championship: 61.5 (4 oz (110 g)) Pork Roll Sandwiches in 10 Minutes, WR (September 21, 2019)
- The Pacific Park World Taco Eating Championship: 82 Carnitas Tacos in 8 Minutes, WR (October 4, 2019)
- Smoke's Poutinerie World Poutine Eating Championship: 28 pounds (13 kilograms) of Poutine in 10 Minutes, WR (October 19, 2019)
- H-E-B True Texas BBQ Challenge: 27 TX-Sized Beef Brisket Sandwiches in 10 Minutes (November 2, 2019)
- The World Famous St. Elmo Shrimp Cocktail Eating Championship: 10 pounds (4.5 kilograms) of Shrimp Cocktail in 8 Minutes (December 7, 2019)

=== 2020 ===
- Blue Runner Foods World Red Beans and Rice Eating Championship: 39.5 (10 oz (280 g)) Bowls in 8 Minutes, WR (February 8, 2020)
- BetOnline Quarantine Challenge Finals: Ramen: 10 Cups of Nissin Cup Ramen Noodles in 1 Minute, 50 Seconds, WR (April 22, 2020)
- Nathan's Hot Dog Eating Contest: 75 Hot Dogs and Buns in 10 Minutes, WR (July 4, 2020)
- The Western Days Festival – World Tamale Eating Championship: 93 (2 oz (57 g)) Tamales in 10 Minutes (September 26, 2020)
- The World Famous St. Elmo Shrimp Cocktail Eating Challenge: Chestnut teamed up with Miki Sudo to consume 100 Bowls of Shrimp Cocktail in 20 Minutes (December 19, 2020)

=== 2021 ===
- The West Virginia Three Rivers Festival – 33 (3.25 oz (92 g)) Pepperoni Rolls in 10 Minutes (May 29, 2021)
- Nathan's Hot Dog Eating Contest: 76 Hot Dogs and Buns in 10 Minutes, WR (July 4, 2021)
- Oktoberfest Zinzinnati World Bratwurst Eating Championship: 68 (3.2 oz (91 g)) Bratwursts in 10 Minutes (September 19, 2021)
- The Trenton Thunder World Famous Case's Pork Roll Eating Championship: 45 (4 oz (110 g)) Case's Pork Roll Sandwiches in 10 Minutes (September 25, 2021)
- Destination Outlets World Pumpkin Pie Eating Championship: 16.75 pounds (7.60 kilograms) of Pumpkin Pie in 8 Minutes (October 10, 2021)
- The World Famous St. Elmo Shrimp Cocktail Eating Championship: 17.1 pounds (7.8 kilograms) of Shrimp Cocktail in 10 Minutes (December 4, 2021)

=== 2022 ===
- Nathan's Hot Dog Eating Contest: 63 Hot Dogs and Buns in 10 Minutes (July 4, 2022)

=== 2023 ===
- Qdoba World Burrito Eating Championship: 14.5 Qdoba Burritos in 10 Minutes (April 6, 2023)
- Nathan's Hot Dog Eating Contest: 62 Hot Dogs and Buns in 10 Minutes (July 4, 2023)
- Balls Out Block Party: Featuring the Cheesesteak Egg Roll Bowl: 46 Cheesesteak Egg Rolls in 8 Minutes, WR (September 30, 2023)

=== 2024 ===
- The Siegel's Bagelmania World Bagel Eating Championship: 15 Bagels with Cream Cheese in 8 Minutes (January 13, 2024)
- Ultimate Bologna Showdown: 14 pounds (6.4 kilograms) of Bologna Slices in 8 Minutes, WR (May 11, 2024)
- Fort Bliss Hot Dog Eating Competition: 57 Hot Dogs and Buns in 5 Minutes, WR (July 4, 2024)
- Chestnut vs. Kobayashi: Unfinished Beef: 83 Hot Dogs and Buns in 10 Minutes, WR (September 2, 2024)
- The World Famous St. Elmo Shrimp Cocktail Eating Championship: 21 pounds (9.5 kilograms) of Shrimp Cocktail in 8 Minutes, WR (December 7, 2024)

=== 2025 ===
- The Siegel's Bagelmania World Bagel Eating Championship: 15 Bagels with Cream Cheese in 8 Minutes (February 1, 2025)
- Ultimate Bologna Showdown: 15.75 pounds (7.14 kilograms) of Smoked Bologna Slices in 8 Minutes, WR (May 10, 2025)
- Nathan's Hot Dog Eating Contest: 70.5 Hot Dogs and Buns in 10 Minutes (July 4, 2025)

=== 2026 ===
- Nathan's Hot Dog Eating Contest: 66 Hot Dogs and Buns in 10 Minutes (July 4, 2026)
- Smoke's Poutinerie World Poutine Eating Championship: 21.25 pounds of Poutine in 10 Minutes (September 19, 2026)
- World Pancake Eating Championship: 40 4oz Pancakes in 10 Minutes, WR (September 26, 2026)
- UCF vs. ASU Key Lime Eating Contest: TBD (November 14, 2026)

== World records held ==
=== 2006 ===
- Jalapeño poppers – 118 in 10 minutes (Tucson, Arizona, on April 8, 2006) at the GoldenPalace.net Jalapeño Popper-Eating Contest
- Grilled cheese sandwiches – 47 in 10 minutes (Thomas & Mack Center in Las Vegas, Nevada, on June 10, 2006) at the GoldenPalace.net World Grilled Cheese-Eating Contest
- Horseshoe sandwiches – 6 lb 5 oz (2.9 kg) in 12 minutes (Illinois State Fair in Springfield, Illinois, on August 12, 2006) at the GoldenPalace.net World Horseshoe Eating Championship
- Utah-made Colosimo Italian sausages – 29 in 10 minutes (Utah State Fair in Salt Lake City, Utah, on September 10, 2006) at the GoldenPalace.net World Italian Sausage Eating Championship
- Pulled pork – 9 lb 6 oz (4.3 kg) in 10 minutes (Horseshoe Casino Council Bluffs in Council Bluffs, Iowa, on September 16, 2006)

=== 2007 ===
- Chicken wings – Long Form: 182 wings in 30 minutes (Wachovia Center in Philadelphia, Pennsylvania, on February 2, 2007) at the Wing Bowl
- Krystal hamburgers: 103 Krystal Burgers in eight minutes (Chattanooga, Tennessee, on October 28, 2007) at the Krystal Square Off
- Kolaches: 56 sausage and cheese kolaches in eight minutes (Houston, Texas, on September 14, 2007) at the Kolache Factory World Kolache Eating Championship
- Pulled pork sandwiches: 45 sandwiches in 10 minutes (Myrtle Beach, South Carolina, on September 1, 2007) at the Myrtle Beach World BBQ Eating Championship

=== 2008 ===
- Steak Big Texan 72oz Steak 8:52
- 7lb "Sasquatch" Burger 7:36

=== 2009 ===
- Funnel cake: 5.9 lb (2.7 kg) in 10 minutes (Kings Dominion in Doswell, Virginia, on May 23, 2009) at the Kings Dominion World Funnel Cake Championship

=== 2011 ===
- Philly cheesesteak: 23 6" Cheesesteaks in 10 minutes (Dorney Park & Wildwater Kingdom in Allentown, Pennsylvania, on May 21, 2011) at the World CheeseSteak Eating Championship @ Dorney Park
- Pizza Hut P'Zones: 7.5 P'Zones in 10 minutes (Spike Guys' Choice Awards in Los Angeles, California, on June 4, 2011) at the Pizza Hut P'Zone Eating CHOW-lenge
- Salt potatoes: 13 lb (5.9 kg) of salt potatoes (Baldwinsville, New York, on May 14, 2011) at the Salt Potato World Eating Championship
- Taco Bell tacos: 53 soft beef tacos in 10 minutes (San Juan, Puerto Rico, on July 29, 2011) at the Taco Bell Why Pay More Soft Taco Challenge

=== 2012 ===
- CP shrimp wonton – 390 in 8 minutes (Bangkok, Thailand, on February 11, 2012) at the Regional Biggest Eating Championship
- Corned beef sandwich – 24 sandwiches in 10 minutes (Palm Beach Gardens, Florida, on March 17, 2012) at The 3rd Annual TooJay's World Class Corned Beef Eating Championship
- Tamales: 102 tamales in 12 minutes (Lewisville, Texas, on September 29, 2012) at the Western Days Festival World Tamale Eating Championship

=== 2013 ===
- Apple pie: 4.375 lb (1.984 kg) of pie in eight minutes (Brunswick, Ohio, September 13, 2013) at Mapleside Farms World Apple Pie Eating Championship
- Brain tacos: 54 tacos in eight minutes (Minneapolis, Minnesota, October 12, 2013) at The World Brain Eating Competition – Zombie Pub Crawl
- Hard boiled eggs: 141 hard-boiled eggs in eight minutes (Radcliff, Kentucky, on October 5, 2013) at the Radcliff Fall Festival
- Pastrami: 25 Katz's Delicatessen half pastrami sandwiches in 10 minutes (Manhattan, New York, on June 2, 2013) at the Katz's Delicatessen World Pastrami Eating Championship
- Pork ribs: 13.76 lb (6.24 kg) pork rib meat (John Ascuaga's Nugget Casino in Sparks, Nevada, on August 28, 2013) at John Ascuaga's Nugget World Rib Eating Championship during the Best in the West Nugget Rib Cook-off Seen in episode of Travel Channel’s Hotel Impossible
- Twinkies: 121 Twinkies in six minutes (Bally's Casino Tunica in Tunica Resorts, Mississippi, on October 26, 2013) at The World Twinkie Eating Championship At Bally's Casino – Tunica

=== 2014 ===
- Deep-fried asparagus: 12.8 lb (5.8 kg) of deep-fried asparagus in 10 minutes (Stockton, California, April 26, 2014) at Stockton Asparagus Festival
- Fish tacos: 30 tacos in five minutes (Winnipeg, Manitoba, Canada on August 9, 2013) at Joey Chestnut vs. Joey's All-Stars Fish Taco World Record Challenge Presented by Joey's Seafood Restaurants
- Gyoza: 384 gyoza in 10 minutes (Los Angeles, California, on August 16, 2014) at The Day-Lee Foods World Gyoza Eating Championship
- Pierogi: 165 pierogi in eight minutes (Horseshoe Casino Hammond in Hammond, Indiana, on October 8, 2014) at the Horseshoe World Pierogi-Eating Championship
- Pulled pork sliders: 62 sliders in 10 minutes (Atmore, Alabama, on March 28, 2014) at the Pork Slider Eating Contest at Wind Creek's Throw Down
- Turkey (whole): 9.35 lb (4.24 kg) of whole turkey in 10 minutes (Foxwoods Resort Casino in Ledyard, Connecticut, on November 22, 2014) at the Foxwoods World Turkey-Eating Championship

=== 2015 ===
- Gumbo: 15 bowls (1.875 gallons) in eight minutes (Larose, Louisiana, on November 7, 2015) at the World Record Gumbo Eating Championship

=== 2016 ===
- Boysenberry pie: 14.5 lb (6.6 kg) of pie in eight minutes (Knott's Berry Farm in Buena Park, California, on March 19, 2016) at The Knott's Boysenberry Festival World Pie Eating Contest
- Burritos – Long Form: 14.5 burritos in 10 minutes (Sports Authority Field at Mile High in Denver, Colorado, on May 28, 2016) at The Denver Outlaws World Burrito Eating Championship Presented by Illegal Pete's
- Gyros: 30 gyros in 10 minutes (Houston, Texas, on May 15, 2016) at Niko Niko's World Gyro Eating Championship
- Meat pies: 23 meat pies in 10 minutes (Bay St. Louis, Mississippi, on March 5, 2016) at The Silver Slipper World Meat Pie Eating Championship

=== 2017 ===
- Glazed doughnuts: 55 doughnuts in eight minutes (Santa Monica, California, on June 2, 2017) at The Salvation Army National Donut Day World Donut Eating Championship
- Tacos – Traditional (three-inch tortilla): 126 tacos in eight minutes (Prior Lake, Minnesota, on May 5, 2017) at the Mystic Lake Casino Hotel World Taco Eating Championship
- White Hut cheeseburgers: 52 Cheeseburgers in 10 minutes (West Springfield, Massachusetts, on September 23, 2017) at The White Hut World Cheeseburg Eating Championship At The Big E

=== 2018 ===
- Hostess Donettes: 257 Hostess Donettes in 6 minutes (Philadelphia, Pennsylvania, on June 1, 2018) at The World Hostess Donettes Eating Championship
- Ice cream sandwiches: 25.5 sandwiches in six minutes (Petco Park in San Diego, California, on June 3, 2018) at The Baked Bear World Ice-Cream Sandwich Eating Championship
- Mutton sandwich: 81 mutton sandwiches in 10 minutes (International Bar-B-Q Festival in Owensboro, Kentucky, on May 12, 2018) at The Owensboro International Bar-B-Q Festival World Mutton Sandwich-Eating Championship
- San Pedro Fish Market shrimp: 7 lb (3.2 kg) of shrimp in eight minutes (San Pedro, California, on May 28, 2018) at The San Pedro Fish Market World Famous Shrimp Eating Championship presented by The Kings of Fi$h on the USS Iowa
- Canteen sandwiches – 18.5 in 10 minutes (Note: Later broken by himself.) (Canteen Lunch in the Alley in Ottumwa, Iowa, on June 2, 2018) at the World Championship Canteen Sandwich-Eating Contest
- Shrimp cocktail: 18 lb 9.6 oz (8.44 kg) of St. Elmo shrimp cocktail in eight minutes (Indianapolis, Indiana, on December 1, 2018) at The World Famous St. Elmo Shrimp Cocktail Eating Championship

=== 2019 ===
- Croquettes: 185 croquettes in 10 minutes (Miami, Florida, on March 10, 2019) at El Croquetazo at Calle Ocho Music Festival presented by Catalina
- Pepperoni rolls: 43 pepperoni rolls in 10 minutes (Fairmont, West Virginia, on May 25, 2019) at The West Virginia Three Rivers Festival Pepperoni Roll Eating World Championship
- Canteen sandwiches: 28.5 Canteen sandwiches in 10 minutes (Canteen Lunch in the Alley in Ottumwa, Iowa, on June 1, 2019) at The 2019 World Championship Canteen Sandwich Eating Contest
- Pizza (2-foot slices): 6.5 slices in 10 minutes (Metairie, Louisiana, on August 25, 2019) at The 2019 Fat Boy's Pizza Eating Championship
- Pork roll sandwiches (4 oz (110 g)): 61.5 sandwiches in 10 minutes (Trenton, New Jersey, on September 21, 2019) at River Fest Featuring the Trenton Thunder World Famous Case's Pork Roll Eating Championship
- Carnitas tacos (2 oz (57 g)): 82 tacos in eight minutes (Pacific Park in Santa Monica, California, on October 4, 2019) at The 2019 Pacific Park World Taco Eating Championship
- Poutine: 28 lb (13 kg) of poutine in 10 minutes (Toronto, Ontario, Canada, on October 19, 2019) at the 10th Annual Smoke's Poutinerie World Poutine Eating Championship
- H-E-B True Texas Beef Brisket BBQ sandwiches – 27 in 10 minutes (Circuit of the Americas in Austin, Texas, on November 2, 2019) at the H-E-B True Texas BBQ Challenge
- Eggo-style waffles – 81 in 8 minutes (San Jose Barracuda in San Jose, California, on November 17, 2019) at the Waffle Eating Championship

=== 2020 ===
- Big Macs: 32 Big Macs in 38 minutes 15 seconds on March 5, 2020
- Ramen noodles (short form) – 10 cups in 1 minute and 50 seconds (On April 22, 2020) at the Major League Eating Quarantine Challenge Finals
- Red Beans and Rice: 39.5 bowls (24 lbs and 11 ounces or ~36,268 calories) in eight minutes in the city of New Orleans for the Blue Runner Red Beans and Rice Major League Eating Contest

=== 2021 ===
- Hot dogs: 76 Nathan's hot dogs and buns (HDB) in 10 minutes (Coney Island, New York, on July 4, 2021) at the Nathan's Hot Dog Eating Contest

=== 2022 ===
- Cherry pie – 17 lb 8 oz (7.9 kg) in 8 minutes (Nationals Park in Washington, D.C., on July 20, 2022) at the Goldman Sachs 10,000 Small Businesses Summit
- Chicken Fingers: 44 Raising Cane's chicken fingers in 5 minutes (Las Vegas, Nevada, on July 27, 2022)
- Popcorn (24 US fl oz (710 ml)): 32 servings in 8 minutes (Victory Field in Indianapolis, Indiana, on August 22, 2022) at an Indianapolis Indians game

=== 2023 ===
- Cheesesteak egg rolls (3 oz (85 g)) – 46 in 8 minutes (Atlantic City, New Jersey, on September 30, 2023) at the Balls Out Block Party: Featuring the Cheesesteak Egg Roll Bowl

=== 2024 ===
- Bologna slices – 14 lb (6.4 kg) in 8 minutes (Knoxville, Tennessee, on May 18, 2024) at the 2024 Ultimate Bologna Showdown
- Hot dogs: 83 hot dogs and buns (HDB) in 10 minutes at the "Chestnut vs. Kobayashi: Unfinished Beef" event on September 2, 2024
- Shrimp cocktail – 21 lb (9.5 kg) in 8 minutes (Indianapolis, Indiana, on December 7, 2024) at the St. Elmo Shrimp Cocktail Eating Contest

=== 2025 ===
- Bologna slices – 15 lb 12 oz (7.1 kg) in 8 minutes (Knoxville, Tennessee, on May 10, 2025) at the 2025 Ultimate Bologna Showdown
- Popcorn (24 US fl oz (710 ml)): 42 servings in 8 minutes (Terre Haute, Indiana, on May 26, 2025) at the Joey Chestnut X Rural King Popcorn Showdown

=== 2026 ===
- Pancakes (4 oz (110 g)): 40 pancakes in 10 minutes (Williamsburg, Virginia, on September 26, 2026) at the World Pancake Eating Championship

== Filmography ==
Filmography
Year	Title	Role	Notes	Ref.
2008	Weekend Today	Himself	1 Episode, July 5	
2008–2009	Man v. Food	Himself	Season 1, Episodes 3, 4, and 15	
2009	Are You Smarter than a 5th Grader?	Himself – Contestant	Season 3, Episode 21	
2010	Shaq Vs.	Himself	Season 2, Episode 4	
2010	Modern Marvels	Himself – Professional Eating Champion	Season 15, Episode 25: "Supersized Food"	
2011	Hungry Girl	Himself	Season 1, Episode 2: "Fill 'Er Up!"	
2012	Hell's Kitchen	Himself – World Champion Competitive Eater	Season 10, Episode 12	
2013	Newsround	Himself – Interviewee (hotdog eating champion)	1 Episode, July 5	
2013	Hotel Impossible	Himself	Season 3, Episode 13: "Crap Out"	
2014	Live with Kelly and Mark	Himself	Season 26, Episode 215	
2014	The Playboy Morning Show	Himself	Season 6, Episode 17	
2014	HuffPost Live Conversations	Himself	Season 1, Episode 33	
2016	Gutfeld!	Himself – Panelist	Season 2, Episode 24	
2017	Swish Swish	Himself	Katy Perry Music Video	
2018	The Amazing Race	Himself	Season 30	
2020	Desus & Mero	Himself	Season 2, Episode 31: "It Be Your Own Mans"	
2020	Scooby-Doo and Guess Who?	Himself (voice)	Season 2, Episode 4: "The Hot Dog Dog!"	
2024	Chestnut vs. Kobayashi: Unfinished Beef	Himself	Netflix Special	
2024	The Drew Barrymore Show	Himself – Guest	Season 5, Episode 20	
2016–2025	The Today Show	Himself – Guest	7 Episodes	
2025	Weekend Breakfast	Himself – Competitive Eater	1 Episode, July 5	
2025	Speed Goes Pro	Himself – Guest	Episode 3, October 29	

== See also ==
- List of competitive eaters
