= National Buffalo Wing Festival =

Food festival in Buffalo, New York

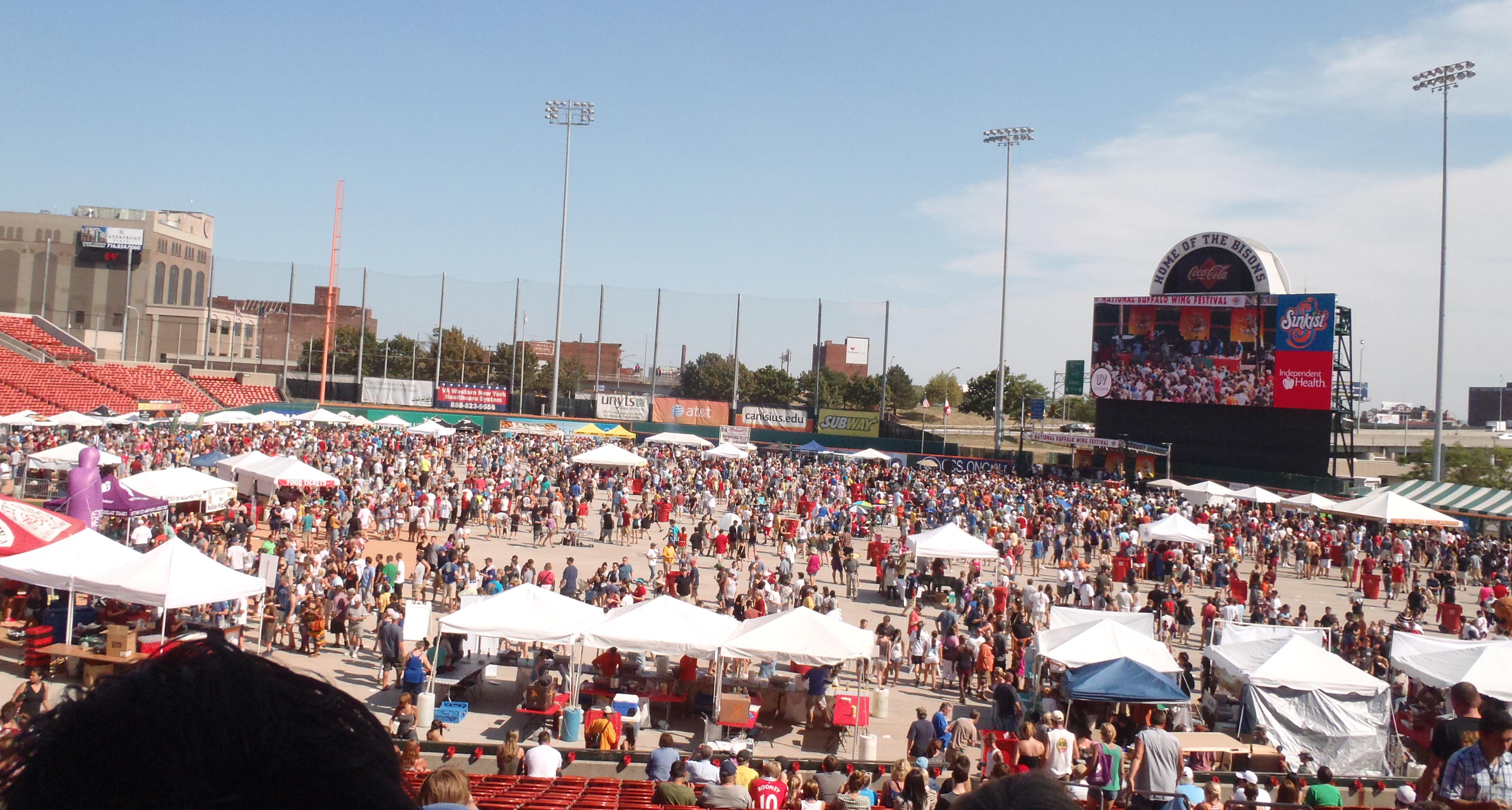
- Dates: Labor Day weekend, 2–3 September 2023
- Frequency: Annual
- Location: Sahlen Field
- Years active: 24
- Inaugurated: 2002
- Attendance: 80,000/yr
- Organizer: Drew Cerza
- Website: buffalowing.com

National Buffalo Wing Festival or Wing Fest is a weekend festival held on Labor Day weekend at Sahlen Field in Buffalo, New York, United States, celebrating the Buffalo style chicken wing. The festival culminates with the IFOCE sanctioned Buffalo Wing eating contest, which has taken place the Sunday of the festival since 2003, except 2020 when it was canceled due to the COVID-19 pandemic.

== Event history ==
This festival was inaugurated in 2002 at Sahlen Field. Founder Drew Cerza, called the "Wing King" by Buffalo News, was said to have modeled the event on a fictitious festival from the 2001 movie Osmosis Jones.

Jill Greenburg said, "Of local festivals that have come and gone, the Wing Fest's staying power is a result of raising approximately $200,000 for local charities and serving almost 3,000,000 chicken wings with 100 sauce varieties to over 500,000 hungry visitors over the years." In 2010, the festival was video webcast live to over 84,000 online viewers.

On September 2, 2012, Joey Chestnut consumed 191 wings, weighing 7.61 pounds (3.45 kg), in 12 minutes to take competitive-eating trophy from seven-time champion Sonya Thomas, becoming the first new champion since 2006. After losing to Miki Sudo in 2013, Chestnut returned to his winning ways in 2014 by breaking his own record by eating 192 wings and successfully defended his title the next year by breaking yet another record, this time eating 205 wings on September 6, 2015. Two years later, he set another record, this time of 220 wings on September 3, 2017. Geoff Esper holds the record of 281 in 2019.

With the 2020 festival canceled due to the COVID-19 pandemic, the 19th was deferred to 2021. However, the Chicken Wing Fun Run went virtual. The 2021 event was held at Highmark Stadium, to which the festival returned in 2022. The 2022 festival also added a qualifying event for the USA Mullet Championships, which Cerza found to be a fitting synergy given the haircut's popularity in ice hockey, a popular sport in Buffalo.

The event will return to Sahlen Field beginning in 2025.

== Event contests ==
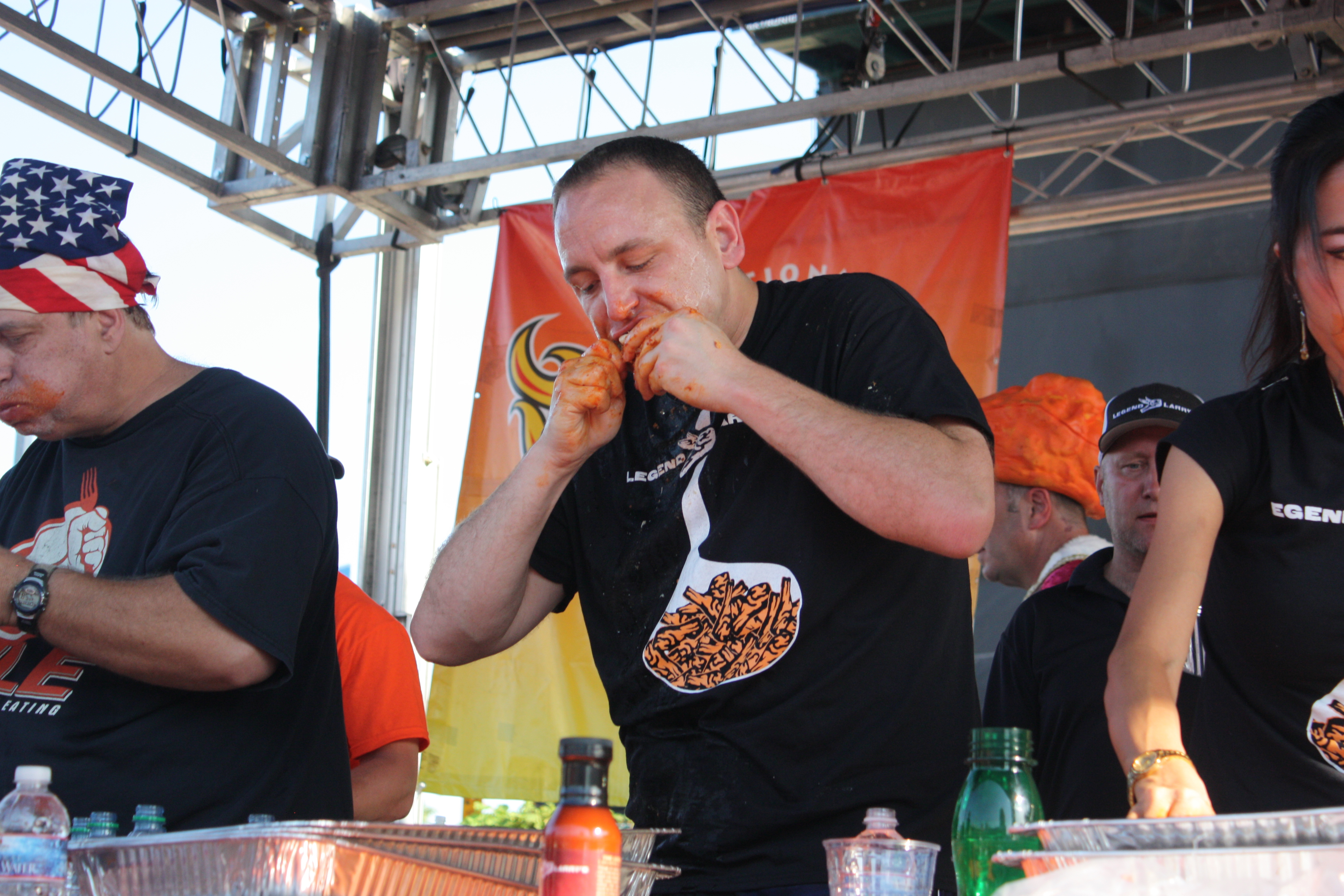
Joey Chestnut competing at the 2012 festival at Sahlen Field

Contests at the National Buffalo Wing Festival include:

- US Chicken Wing Eating Championship
- Amateur Chicken Wing Eating
- Amateur Traditional Sauce Contest
- Amateur Creative Sauce Contest
- Ridiculously Hot Wing Eating Contest
- Miss Buffalo Wing
- Bobbing for Wings
- Baby Wing
- Buffalo Buffet Bowl
- Yancey's Fancy Cheesiest Couple Contest
- Yancey's Fancy Cheesy Dance-Off Contest
- Battle of the Border
- College Wing Eating Competition
- Chicken Wing 5K (3.107 mi.) Run, since 2016.

== US chicken wing eating championship competition winners ==
Contest duration is 12 minutes.

| | Date | Name | Chicken wings eaten | Notes |
|---|---|---|---|---|
| I | 9/2/2002 | Oleg Zhornitskiy | 74 | Inaugural |
| II | 9/1/2003 | (United States) Sonya "Black Widow" Thomas | 134 | |
| III | 9/1/2004 | (United States) Sonya "Black Widow" Thomas | 161 | Event record |
| IV | 9/3/2005 | (United States) Eric "Badlands" Booker | 137 | |
| V | 9/2/2006 | (United States) Chip Simpson | 158 | |
| VI | 9/1/2007 | (United States) Sonya "Black Widow" Thomas | 173 | Event record |
| VII | 8/30/2008 | (United States) Sonya "Black Widow" Thomas | 165 | |
| VIII | 9/6/2009 | (United States) Sonya "Black Widow" Thomas | 169 | |
| IX | 9/5/2010 | (United States) Sonya "Black Widow" Thomas | 181 | Event record |
| X | 9/4/2011 | (United States) Sonya "Black Widow" Thomas | 183 | Event record |
| XI | 9/2/2012 | (United States) Joey "Jaws" Chestnut | 191 | Event record |
| XII | 9/1/2013 | (United States) Miki Sudo | 178 | |
| XIII | 8/31/2014 | (United States) Joey "Jaws" Chestnut | 192 | Event record |
| XIV | 9/6/2015 | (United States) Joey "Jaws" Chestnut | 205 | Event record |
| XV | 9/4/2016 | (United States) Joey "Jaws" Chestnut | 188 | |
| XVI | 9/3/2017 | (United States) Joey "Jaws" Chestnut | 220 | Event record |
| XVII | 9/2/2018 | (United States) Joey "Jaws" Chestnut | 206 | |
| XVIII | 9/1/2019 | (United States) Geoff Esper | 281 | New record. |
| XIX | 9/05/2021 | (United States) Miki Sudo | 246 | Women's event record. |
| XX | 9/04/2022 | (United States) Miki Sudo | 233 | |
| XXI | 9/03/2023 | (Australia) James Webb | 276 | |
| XXII | 8/31/2024 | (Australia) James Webb | 236 | |

== See also ==
- Festivals in Buffalo, New York
