= Matt Stonie =

American competitive eater (born 1992)

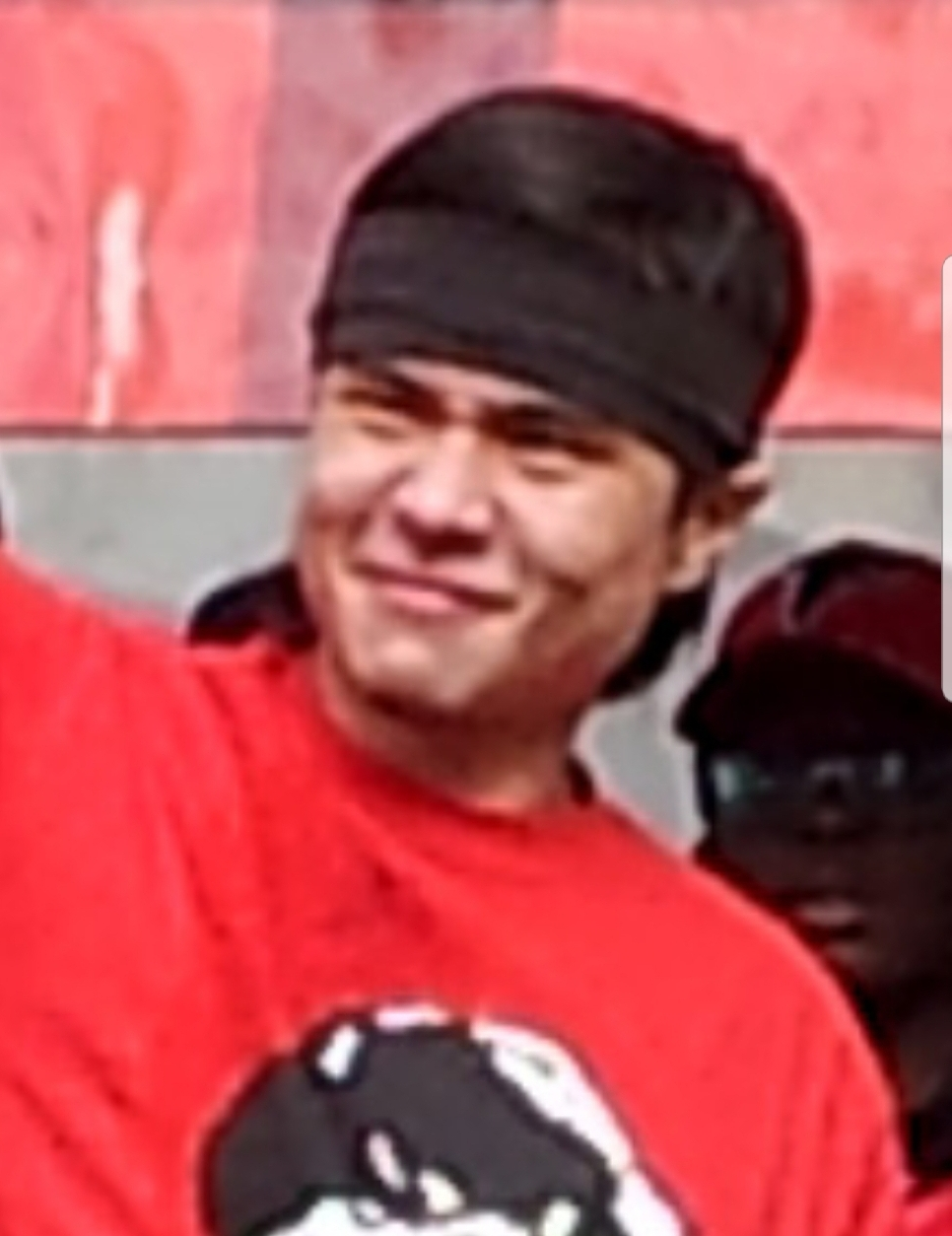
- Stonie in 2014
- Born: Matthew Kai Stonie; May 24, 1992 (age 34); San Francisco, California, U.S.
- Other name: Megatoad
- Occupations: Competitive eater; YouTuber
- Known for: Competitive eating champion
- Height: 5 ft 8 in (1.73 m)
- Spouse: Mei (m. 2025)
- Awards: Nathan's Hot Dog Eating Contest Champion (2015)

YouTube information
- Channel: Matt Stonie
- Years active: 2012–present
- Genre: Speed eating
- Subscribers: 16.4 million
- Views: 3.82 billion
- Last updated: March 18, 2026

Matthew Kai Stonie (born May 24, 1992) is an American competitive eater and YouTuber. Stonie won the 2015 Nathan's Hot Dog Eating Contest, beating 8-time defending champion Joey Chestnut among others. Stonie has gained fame from his YouTube channel, to which he uploads videos of his eating challenges. As of 2026, he has 16.4 million subscribers.

== Early life ==
Stonie was born in San Francisco, California, and raised in San Jose. He is of Japanese, Lithuanian and Czech ancestry. He graduated from Evergreen Valley High School in San Jose. In 2013, he was listed as weighing 134 pounds (61 kilograms) at a height of 5 feet 8 inches (1.73 meters). His nickname, "Megatoad," is from the character Toad from the Super Mario franchise. Stonie's younger brother Morgan was oftentimes involved with the production of the challenges uploaded to his YouTube channel early in his career.

== Career ==
Stonie's Major League Eating debut was at the Stockton Deep Fried Asparagus Championship in Stockton, California, in 2011. At the time, he was the youngest member of the Major League Eating organization, being 18 years old. His first win came in 2010 in a lobster roll eating contest in Hampton Beach, New Hampshire.

On July 4, 2015, Stonie defeated eight-time defending Nathan's Hot Dog Eating Contest champion Joey Chestnut by eating 62 hot dogs to Chestnut's 60.

Stonie has not competed in Major League Eating since 2019 due to a contract dispute, but has continued an independent eating challenge career on YouTube.

As of January 2024, Stonie has amassed over 16.3 million subscribers and 3.62 billion video views on his YouTube channel, with his most viewed video, Most Korean Fire Noodles Ever Eaten (x15 Packs), having been viewed over 145 million times.

In August 2022, Stonie partnered with TGI Fridays to release his own franchise of fast casual restaurants, Stonie Bowls. The franchise focuses on large portion rice and poke bowls. Stonie would release the debut announcement of the franchise as a challenge video that urges viewers to beat his time in eating one of the 5 pound ultimate Stonie bowls.

In September 2024, Stonie participated in the opening undercard match of the livestreamed Netflix event Chestnut vs. Kobayashi: Unfinished Beef. He won a three-minute chicken wing eating contest 53–36 against three Olympians whose scores were added up: water polo player Max Irving and swimmers Ryan Lochte and Ryan Murphy.

== Personal life ==
Stonie got engaged to Mei in January 2023. They got married in February 2025.

== World records held ==
According to Major League Eating, Stonie holds several world records in eating.

Date	Food	Record	Ref.
September 28, 2013	Frozen yogurt	10.5 pounds of Yogurtland frozen yogurt at Phantom Gourmet Food Festival in 6 minutes	
October 26, 2013	Kookamonga Burger	7.5 pound burger from the Kooky Canuck in 4 minutes, 43 seconds (Memphis, Tennessee)	
March 29, 2014	Indian taco	32.5 Indian tacos in 8 minutes (Atmore, Alabama)	
July 12, 2014	Slugburgers	43 slugburgers in 10 minutes (The World Slugburger Eating Championship Presented by Main Street Corinth)	
October 5, 2014	Pumpkin pie	20.8 pounds in 8 minutes (Elk Grove Pumpkin Festival)	
December 2014	McDonald's Happy Meal	15.22 seconds (Fastest Happy Meal eaten)	
February 14, 2015	Birthday cake	14.5 pounds in 8 minutes (West Palm Beach, Florida)	
February 22, 2015	Bacon	182 slices of bacon in 5 minutes (Daytona Beach, Florida)	
May 8, 2015	Iguana's Burritozilla	5 pounds in 1 minute, 50 seconds	
June 20, 2015	Pork sandwiches (8 ounces)	15 sandwiches in 10 minutes at The Backyard at Meadowlands Racing & Entertainment (East Rutherford, New Jersey)	
August 15, 2015	Traditional carne asada tacos	103 tacos in 8 minutes (San Jose, California)	
October 17, 2015	Martorano's signature pasta & sauce	10 pounds in 8 minutes at Martorano's and Paris Hotel & Casino (Las Vegas, Nevada)	
November 24, 2015	Smithfield pork ribs	71 ribs in 5 minutes (Miami, Florida)	
May 28, 2016	Silver dollar pancakes	113 (1 oz) pancakes in 8 minutes at The World Silver Dollar Pancake Eating Championship (Chico, California)	
October 15, 2016	Moon Pies	85 Moon Pies in 8 minutes at The World Moon Pie Eating Championship (Memphis, Tennessee)	
August 12, 2017	Chicken spiedies	20.5 chicken spiedies in 10 minutes at the Tioga Downs World Chicken Spiedie Eating Championship (Nichols, New York)	
October 31, 2020	Halloween candy	4 lbs, 1.9 oz of Halloween candy in 6 minutes (Las Vegas, Nevada)	
April 25, 2021	Popcorn	28.5 24oz servings of popcorn in 8 minutes (Las Vegas, Nevada)	
July 26, 2021	Heart Attack Grill burger	20,000 calorie burger (The Octuple Bypass Burger) in 4:10 (Las Vegas, Nevada)	

== Nathan's Famous Hot Dog Eating Contest results ==
Year	Hot Dogs	Placing
2011	34	T-5th Place
2012	46	4th Place
2013	51	2nd Place
2014	56	2nd Place
2015	62	1st Place
2016	53	2nd Place
2017	48	3rd Place
2018	40	5th Place
2019	46	4th Place

== See also ==
- List of competitive eaters
