= Chestnut vs. Kobayashi: Unfinished Beef =

2024 livestreamed competitive eating event

- Directed by: Ryan Polito

Production
- Executive producers: Jared Morell; Jesse Ignjatovic; Evan Prager; Nicole Lucas Haimes
- Production locations: Luxor Las Vegas, Las Vegas, Nevada
- Running time: 72 minutes

Original release
- Network: Netflix
- Release: September 2, 2024

Chestnut vs. Kobayashi: Unfinished Beef was a one-hour competitive eating special that was live-streamed by Netflix on September 2, 2024.

Three competitive eating matches were held, with the main event being long time rivals in competitive eating, Joey Chestnut and Takeru Kobayashi going head-to-head in a rematch over 15 years in the making. It was Kobayashi's testimonial match.

== Event summary ==
Three competitive eating contests were scheduled in the broadcast.

The opening contest featured Matt Stonie, who defeated Chestnut in 2015 at Coney Island, in a three minute celebrity chicken wing eating contest (with the chicken wings provided by Tyson Foods, which provided the hot dogs in the feature) against three World Aquatics athletes, in a contest reminiscent of the 1980’s Mark Goodson-Bill Todman game show Blockbusters in that could the solo player Stonie defeat the combined effort of three former United States national aquatics team athletes — Max Irving (water polo), Ryan Lochte (swimming), and Ryan Murphy (swimming). Stonie won, 53–36.

In another three minute match, Leah Shutkever, who has held 34 competitive eating records according to Guinness World Records, consumed two kilograms of watermelon in 2:30 to break the former record of 1,750 grams in three minutes.

The main event featured Chestnut vs Kobayashi. A Walmart in Las Vegas provided the buns, and the hot dogs were provided by Tyson Foods through its Ball Park Franks brand. Unlike standard competitions, hot dogs and buns could not be separated or be dipped in water. Joey Chestnut won the event, beating Takeru Kobayashi, 83–66, in the 10 minute competition. Because the rules and specification food was different from Major League Eating rules, it is not an official record.

== Results ==
No.	Results	Stipulations	Times
1	Matt Stonie defeated team of Max Irving, Ryan Lochte, and Ryan Murphy, 53–36	Chicken wing eating match. Irving, Lochte, and Murphy's combined total would be compared to Stonie alone.	3:00
2	Leah Shutkever won by eating 2,000.45 grams of watermelon to set new watermelon eating record.	Eating watermelon to set record (previous record was 1,750 grams in 3:00)	2:30
3	Joey Chestnut defeated Takeru Kobayashi, 83–66	Hot dog eating contest. Hot dog and bun may not be dipped with water (as is commonplace in most competitions), nor may hot dogs and buns be separated.	10:00
