= Krystal Square Off =

World Hamburger Eating Championship

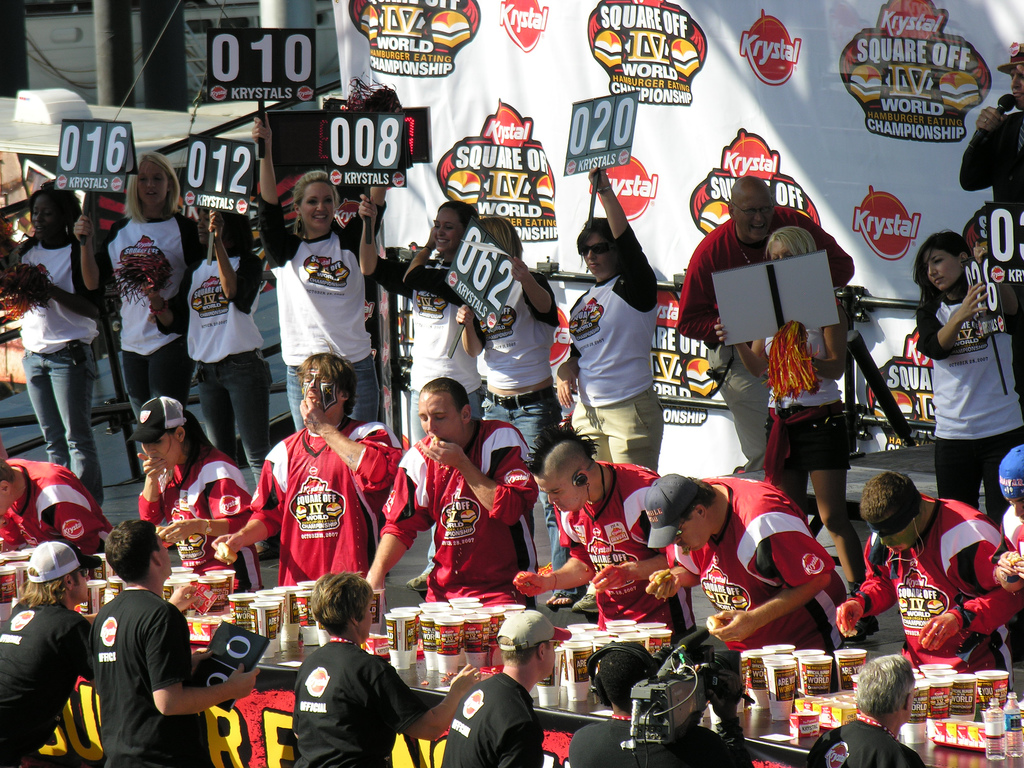
Contestants at the 2007 Krystal Square Off

The Krystal Square Off was the official World Hamburger Eating Championship from 2004 to 2009, taking place in Chattanooga, Tennessee and sanctioned by the International Federation of Competitive Eating (IFOCE). In this event, contestants ate as many Krystal hamburgers as possible in eight minutes.

The sole difference between the hamburgers consumed for the Square Off and the hamburgers purchased from Krystal restaurants is that pickles were removed from hamburgers consumed for the event to minimize the risk of choking.

The Krystal Square Off consisted of a qualifying tour and a world championship. In the qualifying tour, amateur eaters competed with professional eaters for a spot at the world championship. In 2004, the first year of the event, local amateurs Sam Vise and Jeff Hicks defeated professionals to earn a position at the world championship.

The two-minute qualifier record stands at 39 Krystals eaten by "Humble" Bob Shoudt in Nashville, 2007.

Citing "significant" demands on company resources, the company cancelled the event in 2010, looking to shift its "marketing focus and efforts" to new products and new store locations.

== List of winners ==
	Date	Name	First	Second	Third	Fourth	Notes
I	November 13, 2004	(Japan) Takeru "Tsunami" Kobayashi	69	46	41	38	World Record
II	November 19, 2005	(Japan) Takeru "Tsunami" Kobayashi	67	62	56	51	
III	October 28, 2006	(Japan) Takeru "Tsunami" Kobayashi	97	91	76	65	World Record
IV	October 28, 2007	(United States) Joey "Jaws" Chestnut	103	95	94	74	Current World Record
V	September 28, 2008	(United States) Joey "Jaws" Chestnut	93	85	84	76	Kobayashi finished 3rd
VI	September 27, 2009	(Japan) Takeru "Tsunami" Kobayashi	93	81	76	71	No Dunking World Record

== History ==
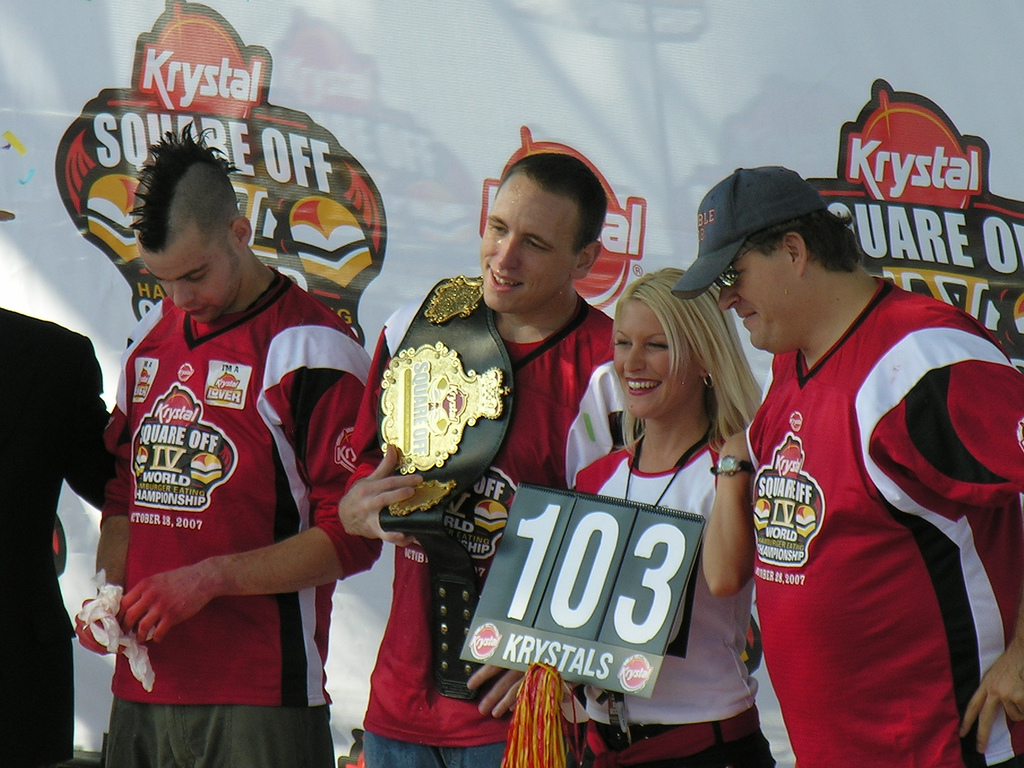
Joey Chestnut holds the world record for eating 103 Krystal burgers in 8 minutes at the 2007 Krystal Square Off.

- 2004: Kobayashi consumed 69 Krystals in the 8-minute contest, pocketing $10,000 in prize money. Second place went to "The Black Widow" Sonya Thomas who ate 46, pocketing $5,000.
- 2005: Kobayashi consumed 67 Krystal hamburgers in the 8-minute contest. Second Place went to Joey Chestnut (62) of San Jose, California. Sonya Thomas (56) took third. "Humble" Bob Shoudt (51) of Royersford, Pennsylvania took fourth place. Prize money was $10,000, $5,000, $2,500, $1,500 respectively, for the top four positions.
- 2006: The event, taking place at the First Tennessee Pavilion, was televised live on ESPN2 for the first time. Kobayashi and Chestnut both topped the event's world record near the midpoint of the contest, with Kobayashi (97 Krystals) taking the victory. Patrick "Deep Dish" Bertoletti, of Chicago also broke the previous world record, finishing third with 76. The winners split a $30,000 purse. An amateur event, dubbed the Krystal Sackful Challenge, was held prior to the main event. It featured two-person teams chosen from the audience, eating as many Krystals as possible in two minutes. The winners of the inaugural challenge were Matt Alling, 24, of Birmingham, and Bruce Clements, 23, of Chattanooga.
- 2007: Joey Chestnut devoured 103 Krystal hamburgers in eight minutes to win the Krystal Square Off IV World Hamburger Eating Championship. The battle for second between 22-year-old Patrick "Deep Dish" Bertoletti and "Humble" Bob Shoudt, 41, ended in an upset. Shoudt, ranked seventh in the world, consumed 95 Krystals to edge out Bertoletti, the number two ranked eater in the world. Chestnut won $10,000 and a Krystal Square Off champion's belt and trophy made out of crystal. Shoudt's runner-up finish earned $7,500, while Bertoletti third-place finish earned $3,500. The winner of the first three competitions, Takeru Kobayashi, did not participate due to a jaw injury.
- 2008: Joey Chestnut defended his title successfully, eating 93 Krystals. Pat "Deep Dish" Bertoletti finished second with 85. Takeru Kobayashi scored 84, 13 fewer than his 2006 total, to place third.
- 2009: This last edition featured a revised ruleset. First, eaters were no longer allowed to dunk their hamburgers in liquid in an effort to eliminate “detritus” during the competition. Also new this year, every eater was given five Big Angus Burgers at the start of the competition in addition to their tray of Krystal hamburgers. Each Big Angus Burger consumed added five hamburgers to an eater’s total count. Takeru Kobayashi defeated reigning champion Joey Chestnut with a score of 93 (68 Krystals, 5 Big Angus Burgers), earning the $20,000 top prize. Chestnut was second, with 81, and Pat "Deep Dish" Bertoletti finished third, with 76.
- 2010: There has been no event since 2010 as the company changed its "marketing focus and efforts" to new products and new company-owned restaurant locations. It was called off in August.

== A list of contestants ==
=== 100 burgers or more ("The Double Tre Double Deuce") ===
- Joey "Jaws" Chestnut (San Jose, CA) - 103 (#1 2007)

=== 90 burgers or more ("The Triple Tre") ===
- Takeru "Tsunami" Kobayashi (Nagano, Japan) - 97 (#1 2006)
- "Humble" Bob Shoudt (home page) (Royersford, PA) - 95 (#2 2007)
- Patrick "Deep Dish" Bertoletti (Chicago, IL) - 94 (#3 2007)

=== 70 burgers or more ("The Double Tre and a Half Deuce") ===
- Tim Janus (New York, NY) - 74 (#4 2007)

=== 60 burgers or more ("The Double Tre") ===
- Hall Hunt (Jacksonville Beach, FL ) - 63 (#6 2008)
- Sonya "The Black Widow" Thomas (Alexandria, VA) - 62 (#1 Chattanooga, TN qualifier 2006)

=== 50 burgers or more ("The Deuce Tre") ===
- Juliet Lee (Germantown, MD) - 55 (#7 2008)
- Chip Simpson (USA) - 55 (#5 (tie) 2006)
- Rich "The Locust" LeFevre (Henderson, NV) - 53 (#6 2007)
- Shaun Kesler (Chattanooga, TN) - 52 (#2 Atlanta, GA qualifier 2006)
- Eric "Badlands" Booker (Copiague, NY) - 51 (#2 Nashville, TN qualifier 2008)
- Juris Shibayama (Murfreesboro, TN) - 51 (#2 Nashville, TN qualifier 2008)
- Crazy Legs Conti (New York NY,) - 50 (#2 Knoxville, TN qualifier 2008)
- Erik "The Red" Denmark (Seattle, WA ) - 50 (#3 Memphis, TN qualifier 2008)

=== 40 burgers or more ("The Double Deuce") ===
- Tim "Gravy" Brown (Chicago, IL) - 45 (#2 Atlanta, GA qualifier 2008)
- Jim "Buffalo" Reeves (Buffalo, NY) - 44 (#3 Atlanta, GA qualifier 2008)
- Arturo "The Natural" Rios (NJ) - 44 (#9 2006)
- Allen "The Shredder" Goldstein - 42 (#2 Atlanta, GA qualifier 2007)
- Seaver "The Achiever" Miller (Ashburn, VA) - 41 (#3 Memphis, TN qualifier 2006)

=== 30 burgers or more ("The Tre") ===
- Dale Boone (Atlanta, GA) - 38 (#12 2006 finals)
- Elizabeth Canady (Bradenton, FL) - 38 (#2 Jacksonville, FL 2007)
- Ron Koch (Las Vegas, NV,) - 37 (#8 2005 finals)
- Justin Mih (Boston, MA,) - 36 (#13 2006 finals)
- Eric "Steakbellie" Livingston (Drexel Hill, PA) - 35 (#4 Atlanta, GA qualifier 2008)
- RJ Frasca - 35 (#3, Jacksonville, FL qualifier 2009)
- Sam Vise (Union City, TN) - 35 (#10 2005 finals)
- Micah "Wing Kong" Collins (Drexel Hill, PA) - 33 (#5 Atlanta, GA qualifier 2008)
- Lynn Curley (Nashville, TN ) - 33 (#2 Nashville, TN qualifier 2004)
- Charles "The Godfather" Hardy (Brooklyn, NY) - 33 (#6 (tie) 2004 finals)
- Ed "Cookie" Jarvis (Nesconsett, NY) - 33 (#6 (tie) 2004 finals)
- Chris Abatsas (TN) - 32 (#2 Chattanooga, TN qualifier 2006)
- Nathan Biller (Briarwood, NY) - 32 (#5 Nashville, TN qualifier 2008)
- Pete "Pretty Boy" Davekos (Boston, MA) - 32 (#3 Knoxville, TN qualifier 2008)
- Russ Keeler (PA, USA) - 31 (#2 Perry GA qualifier 2007)
- Rick Petralia (Chattanooga, TN) - 31 (#3 Chattanooga, TN qualifier 2009)
- Dave "U.S. Male" Goldstein (Voorhees, NJ) - 30 (#5 Knoxville, TN qualifier 2008)
- Cade Hardin (Huntsville, AL) - 30 (#3 Nashville, TN qualifier 2004)
- Carlene LeFevre (Henderson, NV) - 30 (#2 Perry, GA qualifier 2004)
- Kevin Ross (Temecula, CA) - 30 (#3 Nashville, TN qualifier 2007)
- Loren "Bubba" Yarbrough (Newnan, GA) - 30 (#13 2005 finals)

== See also ==
- Competitive eating
- Krystal (restaurant)
- Nathan's Hot Dog Eating Contest
- Wing Bowl
