= Best in the West Nugget Rib Cook-off =

Annual rib cook-off in Sparks, Nevada

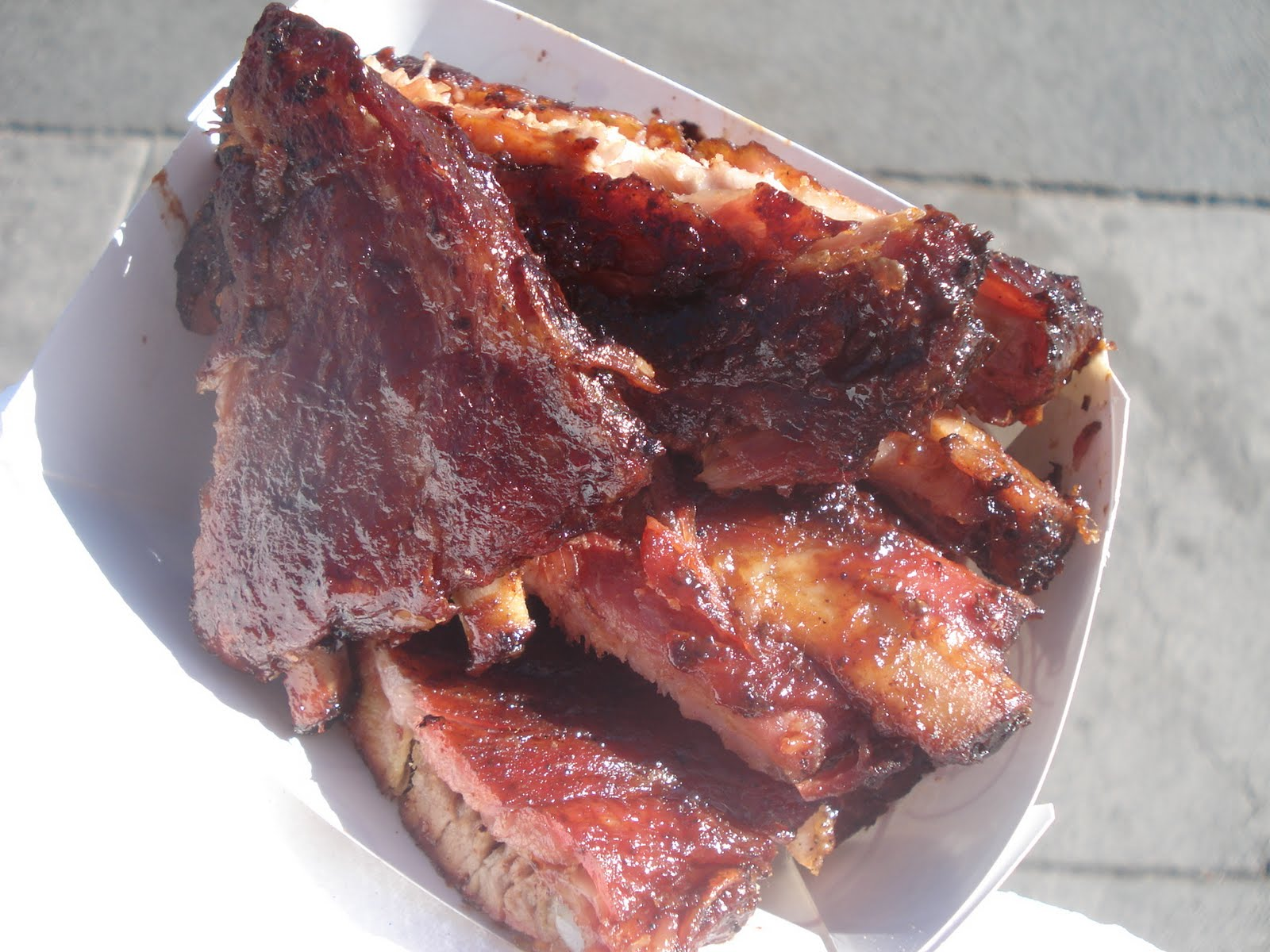
Pork ribs at the Best in the West Nugget Rib Cook-off

The Best in the West Nugget Rib Cook-off is an annual rib cook-off in Sparks, Nevada. The competition involves St. Louis-style pork ribs. The event is held at Victorian Square in Sparks and has taken place annually over the Labor Day weekend since 1989; it is sponsored by the Nugget Casino Resort.

== History ==
The Best in the West Nugget Rib Cook-off began in 1989, with six entries and a small group of casino customers. The initial event did not involve cooking the ribs on-site, but rather reheating them with cans of Sterno fuel. The inaugural winner was North Main Barbecue from Euless, Texas.

The event is the main attraction for Sparks, and is mentioned in travel guides and barbecue books.

== Rib cook-off and other competitions ==
The rib cook-off takes place over six days in Victorian Square in Sparks, Nevada; six blocks of Victorian Avenue are closed to traffic during the event for the cook-off competitors and other vendors to stage their booths. Aside from the actual cook-off, ribs are sold to the general public. In addition to the ribs there is a small arts and crafts fair and a few children's rides. In 2007 the event, for the first time, drew half a million visitors, and has done so every following year, serving up to 100 tons of St. Louis-style ribs. It was calculated that the 2006 event produced "1.4 million bones' worth of pork ribs."

Top prize for the judged event is $19,500. There is also a "people's choice award" and an award for best sauce.

The 32nd annual Rib Cook-off will take place 01–06 September 2021, as there'll be no cook-off in 2020 caused by the COVID-19 pandemic. There will be 23 competitors vying for upwards of $20,000 in prize money. The event includes a Rib Village, beer garden and live entertainment.

== Statistics ==
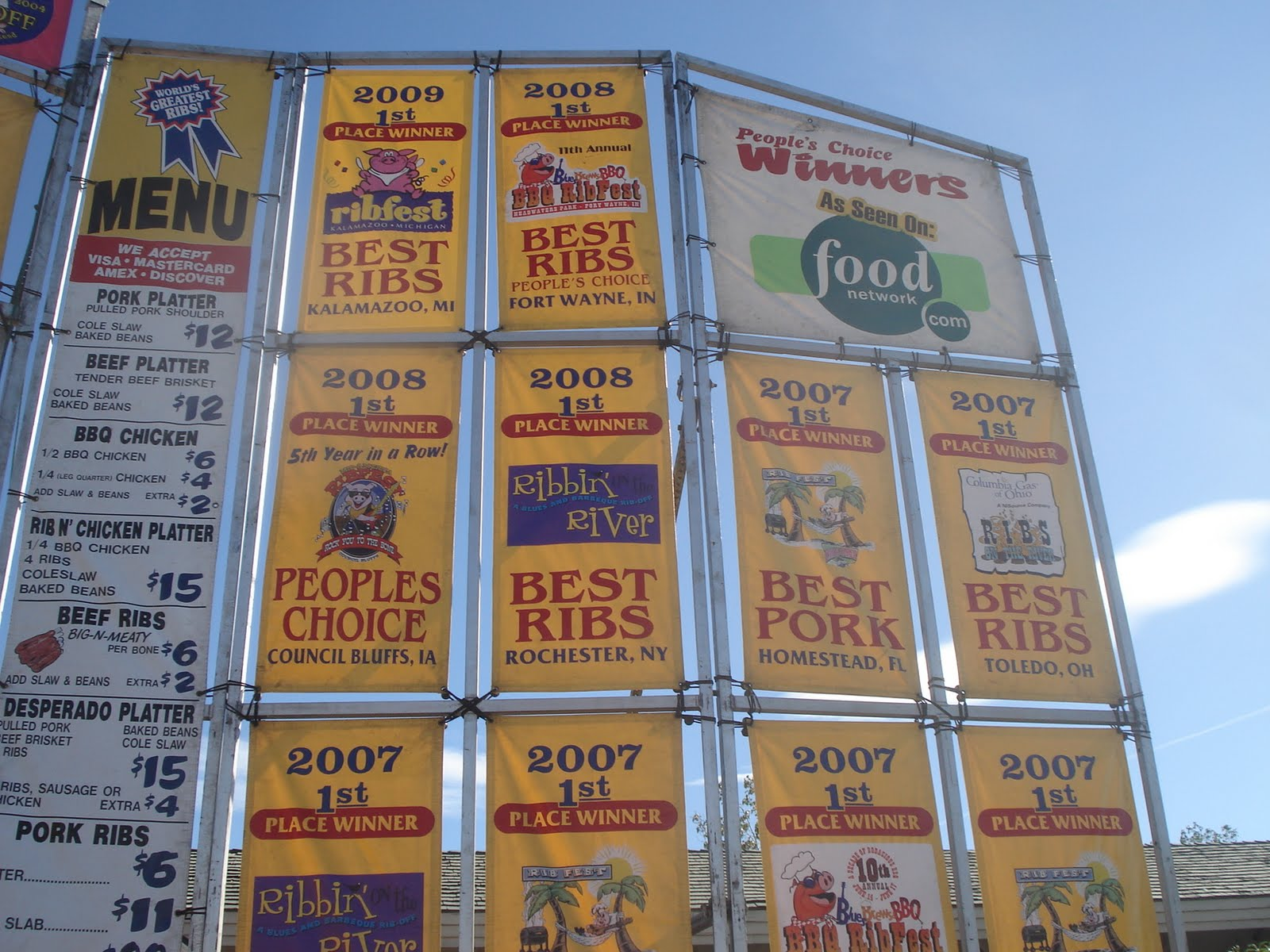
A vendor displaying their awards

| Year | Attendance (estimated) | Ribs cooked (lbs) | Winner's home state | References |
|---|---|---|---|---|
| 1989 | 30,000 | | Texas | |
| 1990 | | | | |
| 1991 | | | California | |
| 1992 | | | Texas | |
| 1993 | | | | |
| 1994 | | | | |
| 1995 | | | Arizona | |
| 1996 | | | Texas | |
| 1997 | | | Texas | |
| 1998 | | | Nevada | |
| 1999 | | | Michigan | |
| 2000 | | | Kentucky | |
| 2001 | 300,000* | 126,000* | Pennsylvania | |
| 2002 | | | Kentucky | |
| 2003 | | | Kentucky | |
| 2004 | 300,000 | 148,000 | Virginia | |
| 2005 | 300,000* | 150,000* | New Jersey | |
| 2006 | 400,000 | | Minnesota | |
| 2007 | 500,000* | 200,000* | Minnesota | |
| 2008 | 500,000 | 100,000 | Michigan | |
| 2009 | 500,000 | 200,000 | Ohio | |
| 2010 | | | Michigan | |
| 2011 | | | California | |
| 2012 | | | Illinois | |
| 2013 | | | Minnesota | |
| 2014 | | | Ohio | |
| 2015 | | | Michigan | |
| 2016 | | | Indiana | |
| 2017 | | | Illinois | |
| 2018 | | | Montana | |
| 2019 | | | Montana | |
| 2020 | COVID-19 pandemic saw no winner. | | | |

Note: Statistics marked with an asterisk (*) are pre-event estimates.
