= Yancey's Fancy =

American cheese company

- Company type: Private
- Industry: Dairy Products, Cheesemaker
- Founded: 1947
- Founder: Leo Kutter
- Headquarters: Corfu, New York, United States
- Key people: Eric Cosnoski (CEO)
- Products: Artisan cheese, Cheese
- Owner: D & Y Cheeses
- Number of employees: 120+
- Website: www.yanceysfancy.com

Yancey's Fancy is a producer of artisan cheeses based in Corfu, New York, USA. The company was formerly known as Darn Good Foods, Inc. The Yancey's Fancy name was established in 1998 when John Yancey (whose family operated Heluva Good!) and his long-time business associate Mike Wimble bought the Kutter's Cheese business and factory from Richard and Tony Kutter, who retired.

== History ==
The Kutters' father, Leo, founded the Kutter Cheese Factory in 1926 in Cowlesville, New York. After ceasing operations because of the shortage of fresh milk during World War II, Leo moved the company to Corfu in 1947. The factory with its outlet store is located on NY Route 5, nearly halfway between Buffalo and Rochester, New York.

== Products ==
Buffalo Wing Hot Sauce Cheddar

Yancey’s Fancy cheese factory produces a variety of different flavors. The company utilizes the local milk supply in Western New York when crafting its products.

== Awards ==
Yancey's Fancy won a gold medal at the 2010 World Championship Cheese Contest in Madison, Wisconsin, for 'Best of Class, Jalapeño & Peppadew Cheddar.' The cheese also won a 2010 New York State Fair Grand Champion award.

== Sponsorships ==
Yancey's Fancy is a major athletic sponsor of the Buffalo Bills (NFL), Buffalo Sabres (NHL), and the Rochester Americans (AHL). The company did sponsors Watkins Glen International constantly for the Finger lakes Wine Festival, which has been listed by the American Bus Association as one of North America's Top 100 events for 2011, 2012, and 2013.

== See also ==
- List of dairy product companies in the United States
