= Erik Denmark =

American competitive eater

Erik "The Red" Denmark (born about 1980) is an American competitive eater and a member of the International Federation of Competitive Eating. He lives in Seattle, Washington and is nicknamed after Erik the Red, who was a Viking that founded the first Nordic settlement in Greenland. He has a master’s degree in digital communications media and works in aerospace procurement.

== Competition and records ==
Denmark competed in the 2007 Nathan's Hot Dog Eating Contest, placing 14th and eating 26 hot dogs with buns in 12 minutes. He placed 11th in 2006 eating 22 hot dogs.

- Native American fry bread: 9.75 fry breads in 8 minutes, October 28, 2006
- Hamburgers: 45 Krystal hamburgers in 8 minutes at the 2007 Krystal Square Off Finals, October 28, 2007
- Shrimp: 4 lb and 15 oz spot shrimp in 12 minutes, September 22, 2006
