= Colonial Hills (disambiguation) =

Colonial Hills is a planned community in Worthington, Ohio. Colonial Hills may also refer to:

== Places ==
- Colonial Hills (East Point), a neighborhood in East Point, Georgia, USA
- Colonial Hills, a neighborhood in Holiday, Florida
- Colonial Hills, a place in Berks County, Pennsylvania
- Colonial Hills, a place in Mifflin County, Pennsylvania
- Colonial Hills, a neighborhood in southern Knoxville, Tennessee
- Colonial Hills, a subdivision in Abilene, Texas
- Colonial Hills Park, a park in Lincoln, Nebraska

== Other uses ==
- Colonial Hills Christian School, a private Christian school in the Georgia neighborhood
- Colonial Hills Conference, a defunct high school athletic conference in New Jersey
