= Todd Tibbals =

American architect (1910–1988)

Todd Tibbals (1910 – March 22, 1988) was an American architect who was active in the Columbus, Ohio area in the middle part of the twentieth century.

== Early life and education ==
Alfred "Todd" Tibbals was born in 1910 to a successful engineer and entrepreneur, Charles E. Tibbals (1872–1961). His father was a professional mining engineer and manager of the Royal Elkhorn Coal Company of Prestonsburg, Kentucky. In 1923, the family moved to Columbus where Tibbals' father pioneered in the candy vending business.

Tibbals attended the Ohio State University, where he was a hard working student. When assigned a task to draw part of a house, Tibbals would draw the entire house and notate the drawing with Tibbals Does It Again. His instructors, finding this presumptuous, would give him hell. Tibbals graduated in 1932.

== Career ==
Out of the Italian hill country came the inspiration breathed into this little home in Columbus, Ohio, designed and built by Todd Tibbals for himself. Its heavy, red-tile roof and whitewashed stone copy the colorful homes perched along the seacoast, and the deep blue shutters are a reflection of the bright Mediterranean waters.

Tibbals began practicing architecture in Columbus, Ohio in 1935. By 1939, he had designed his own home at 995 Woodhill Drive in Grandview Heights, Ohio, which was featured in the November 1940 Better Homes and Gardens magazine.

Tibbal's Italian Cottage.

He established an office at the corner of 15th Avenue and High Street and named his firm Todd Tibbals and Associates. Tibbals and his associate Noverre Musson both won Architects Society of Ohio awards in 1942 for private residences they designed. Musson was a fellow Ohio State Graduate, and had studied for two years under Frank Lloyd Wright. Other members of the firm included Wilmer Nieb, Arthur Dupre, Charles W. Lewis and Mary Garrison. Nieb and Dupre were architects, Lewis supervised construction and Garrison designed interior blandishments.

Tibbals firm designed nine homes which were replicated throughout the Colonial Hills and Dales subdivision in Worthington, Ohio in 1942, a pioneering suburban development funded by the Defense Homes Corporation. This was a major commission for the 30-year-old architect. In 1945, he renamed the firm to Tibbals, Crumley and Musson with new partner George Crumley.

As president of the Columbus Home Builders Association, he was in favor of rehabilitating slum areas in Columbus to provide decent shelter to low-income people. This ideology led him to become a developer and purchase a property in Whitehall that needed renovations.

In May 1960, Tibbals was elected President of the Executives' Club of Columbus. At that time he was President of the Columbus Lumber Company. In 1963, he designed the first senior living and assisted care community in the nation, First Community Village. An avid golfer, he was a member of the Senior Golf Association and played on the winning team in the first Pro-Am Golf Tournament in Columbus, Ohio.

== Personal life and death ==
In 1933, he married Helen A. Lea Tibbals.

Tibbals was known for his orchid collection and converted a toolshed into a greenhouse.

Tibbals died at the age of 78 on March 22, 1988.

== Major works ==
- 995 Woodhill Drive, Grandview Heights, Ohio
- Colonial Hills, Worthington, Ohio 1942
- Westland Lazarus Store, 1962
- First Community Village, Upper Arlington, Ohio, 1963
- The Ohio Bell Building, Columbus, Ohio
- The Ohio State School for the Deaf, Columbus, Ohio
- Drake Union, Ohio State University, 1972
- Fine Arts Building, Ohio State University

== See also ==
- Colonial Hills

== Notes ==
- Houses With a Past ... Doorways With a Future Better Homes and Gardens, November, 1940, pg. 26.
- The Columbus Dispatch, Community is Planned by Todd Tibbals Firm, October 11, 1942, Pg. 5C.
- The Columbus Dispatch, Executives' Club Elects Todd Tibbals, May 30, 1960, Pg. 6A.
- The Columbus Dispatch, Charles Tibbals: Father of Developer Dead at 89, September 29, 1961, Pg. 28A.
- The Columbus Dispatch, Obituary for Todd Tibbals, March 25, 1988, Pg. 9C.
