= Colonial Hills (East Point) =

Coordinates: 33°41′44″N 84°26′08″W

- Neighborhood
- Location within Georgia
- Country: United States United States
- State: Georgia
- City: East Point
- Time zone: UTC-5 (Eastern (EST))
  - Summer (DST): UTC-4 (EDT)

Colonial Hills is a neighborhood in the northernmost section of East Point, Georgia. It is located along Langford Parkway (previously known as Lakewood Freeway), just south of the former military base Fort McPherson, known locally as Fort Mac.

== Streets ==
Colonial Hills consists of the following streets: Chambers Ave., Clermont Ave., Dauphine St., Elizabeth Ln., Hawthorne Way, Newnan Ave., St. Francis Ave., St. Joseph Ave., St. Michael Ave., McClelland Ave., McPherson Dr., & Womack Ave.

== Neighborhood Association ==
Colonial Hills Neighborhood Association, Inc. (CHNA) is a Section 501(c)(3) nonprofit and voluntary association which carries out community and cultural work in the neighborhood.

== Schools ==
Schools that serve the Colonial Hills area:

- HAMILTON E. HOLMES Elementary School
- PAUL D. WEST Middle School
- TRI-CITIES High School
- Cameron Academy
- Jere A. Wells
- Colonial Hills Christian School (K-12) was located here for over 38 years.
- Romar Academy
