= Dale Boone =

American competitive eater (born 1966)

- Born: 1966 (age 59–60); Brookhaven, Georgia, US
- Other name: Mouth of the South
- Occupation: Competitive eater

Dale Boone (born 1966) is an American competitive eater who holds several records for, among others, devouring pelmeni and hot dogs. Having been featured on numerous television programmes, he has proclaimed himself "Mouth of the South". Boone claims to be the great grandson of Daniel Boone.

== Early life ==
Dale Boone was born in 1966 in Brookhaven and was raised in East Point, located south of Atlanta. Boone credits the first eating competition he entered as a watermelon-eating contest in Locust Grove.

== Career ==
=== Competitive eating ===
==== Early career ====
Boone joined competitive eating as a professional in 2000. That year, he was awarded the title of "Rookie of the Year" by the International Federation of Competitive Eating (IFOCE). Thereafter, he signed an exclusive twenty-four-month contract with the federation.

In 2003, Boone emerged as champion of the Ultimate Eating Tournament at Broadway at the Beach in Myrtle Beach, South California. Boone won the Nathan's Hot Dog Eating Contest at Zoo Atlanta in 2004, having wolfed down fifteen hot dog buns in twelve minutes. However, his performance at the qualifiers were the worst when compared with that of the other qualifiers' and he made a dismal showing at the finals, letting Takeru Kobayashi of Japan snag the title of champion.

==== 2005–2010 ====
After a successful 2004, Boone experienced a dry spell in his professional career. The President of the IFOCE, George Shea, commented, "He [Boone] may have experienced lofty heights too quickly. He seems to be having a sophomore slump." However, he quickly rebounded and won the 84 Lumber baked bean eating contest, beating runner-up Cookie Jarvis by a mere second with a timing of 82 ounces of lumber beans in one minute and fifty-two seconds.

In July 2006, Boone took part in the GoldenPalace.net Memphis Rib Eating Championship and emerged as victor. After which, he was suspended from competitive eating by the IFOCE for unspecified reasons. A spokesperson for the organisation stated that Boone's behaviour was being monitored for further assessment. After returning from his suspension, Boone went on to receive the title of Perry Krystal Champ by finishing, in eight minutes, thirty-seven Krystals. He beat Justin Mih by one Krystal.

In 2007, Boone again won the Zoo Atlanta Qualifier for the Nathan's Hot Dog Eating Contest, although he ultimately lost at the finals. To add insult to injury, he was taunted by fellow competitor Patrick Bertoletti, who mimicked his style and even made a Cabbage Patch Doll effigy of Boone.

In May 2009, Boone captured the winner's title at the inaugural World Donut Eating Championship at Bangalore, India, organised by Donut Baker.

==== 2011–present ====
Boone competed in the Z-Burger's 4th Annual Independence Burger Eating Contest in July 2012. The event, which was held in Washington, aimed to see who could consume the most burgers in ten minutes. Boone lost out to defending champion Peter Czerwinski, better known as Furious Pete. Immediately after the competition Czerwinski discovered that Boone tried to cheat by concealing some food in his darkly colored Crystal Light drink. Though in the end Boone was not disqualified, he lost in a one-minute eat off against Czerwinski.

In June 2013, he participated in the Big Wiener Eating Contest fundraiser held at Mo's Mustang Market. The same month, he also attended the Taco Eating Contest at the Bethalto City Park. The competition marked the fiftieth anniversary of the Bethalto Jaycees Country Fair.

==== Records and style ====
Boone holds a total of 52 world records. Some of them are records for eating hot dogs, including having eaten ten hot dogs in two minutes and fifty-five seconds. He has also set a world record for eating twenty-eight reindeer sausages in twelve minutes. His second world record of finishing two hundred and seventy-four Russian dumplings (pelmeni) in six minutes was included in a compilation by Bleacher Report, titled "Top 10 Unbreakable and Disgusting Competitive Eating Records". His win at the 2009 Indian donut eating contest earned him another world record for chowing down forty-four doughnuts in twelve minutes. Boone is the reigning World Champion of the World League Of Competitive Eating (WLOCE), HQ in Bangalore, India.

Hailing himself as the "Mouth of the South", Boone often attends eating competitions dressed in "overalls and a foxtail-decorated fur hat". His unconventional antics, which have often caused disruption at competitions, have caused his fellow competitive eaters to dislike him, according to his profile at the Major League Eating's official website.

=== Television appearances ===
In 2000, following his debut as a competitive eater, Boone starred in Gut Busters in Alaska, a television documentary produced by Discovery Channel. He has also made appearances on The Tonight Show with Jay Leno, The Weakest Link, National Geographic, CNN, and ESPN.

== Personal life ==
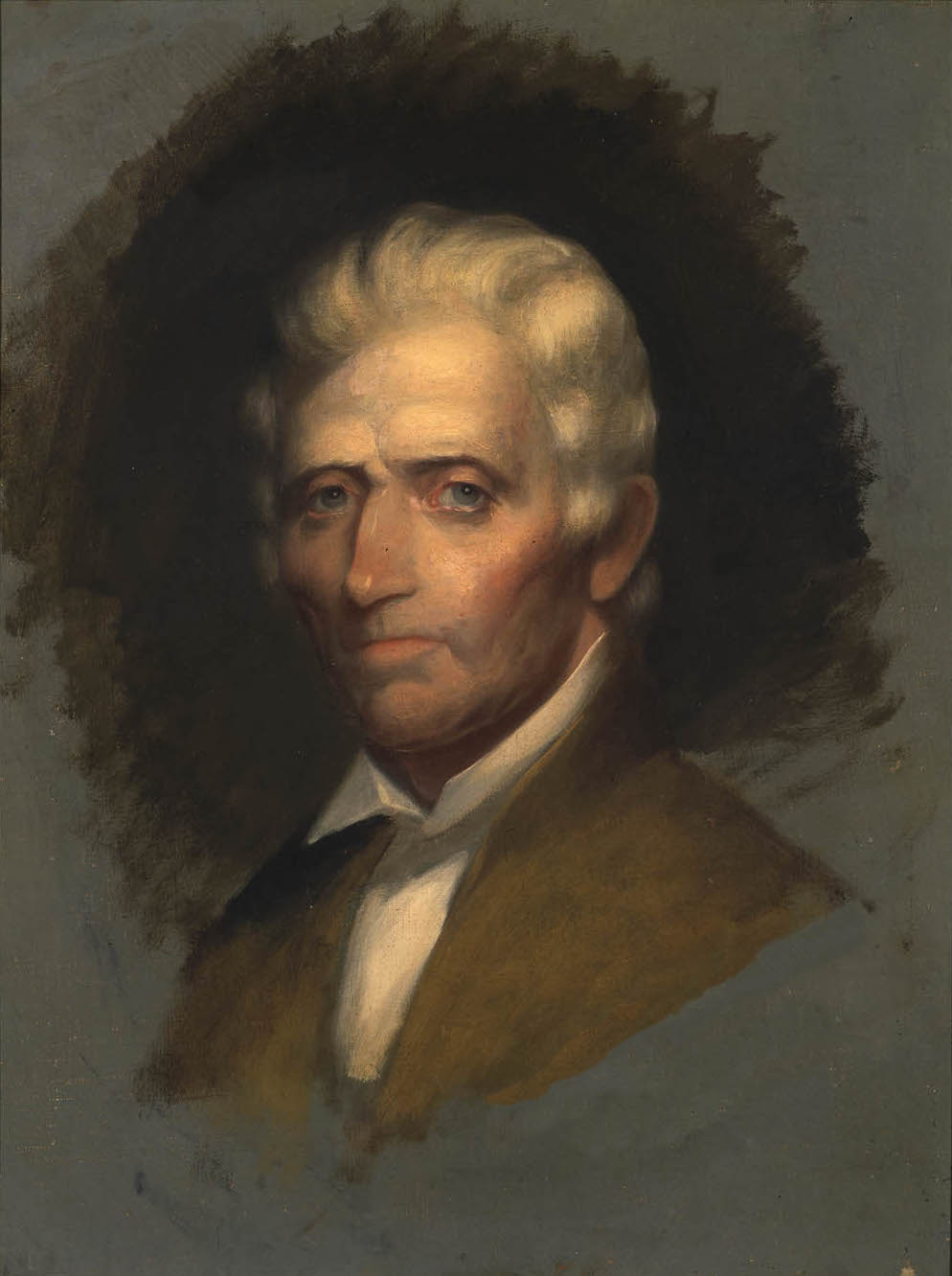
Boone's alleged ancestor, Daniel Boone

Boone is allegedly a direct descendant of American pioneer Daniel Boone. His self-proclaimed favorite foods are gravy and biscuits. Boone is single, and works as a Hindi-language film director for a living. Outside of competitions, Boone reportedly adheres to a "strict diet".
