= Ohio Union =

Student activity center at Ohio State University in Columbus, OH, US

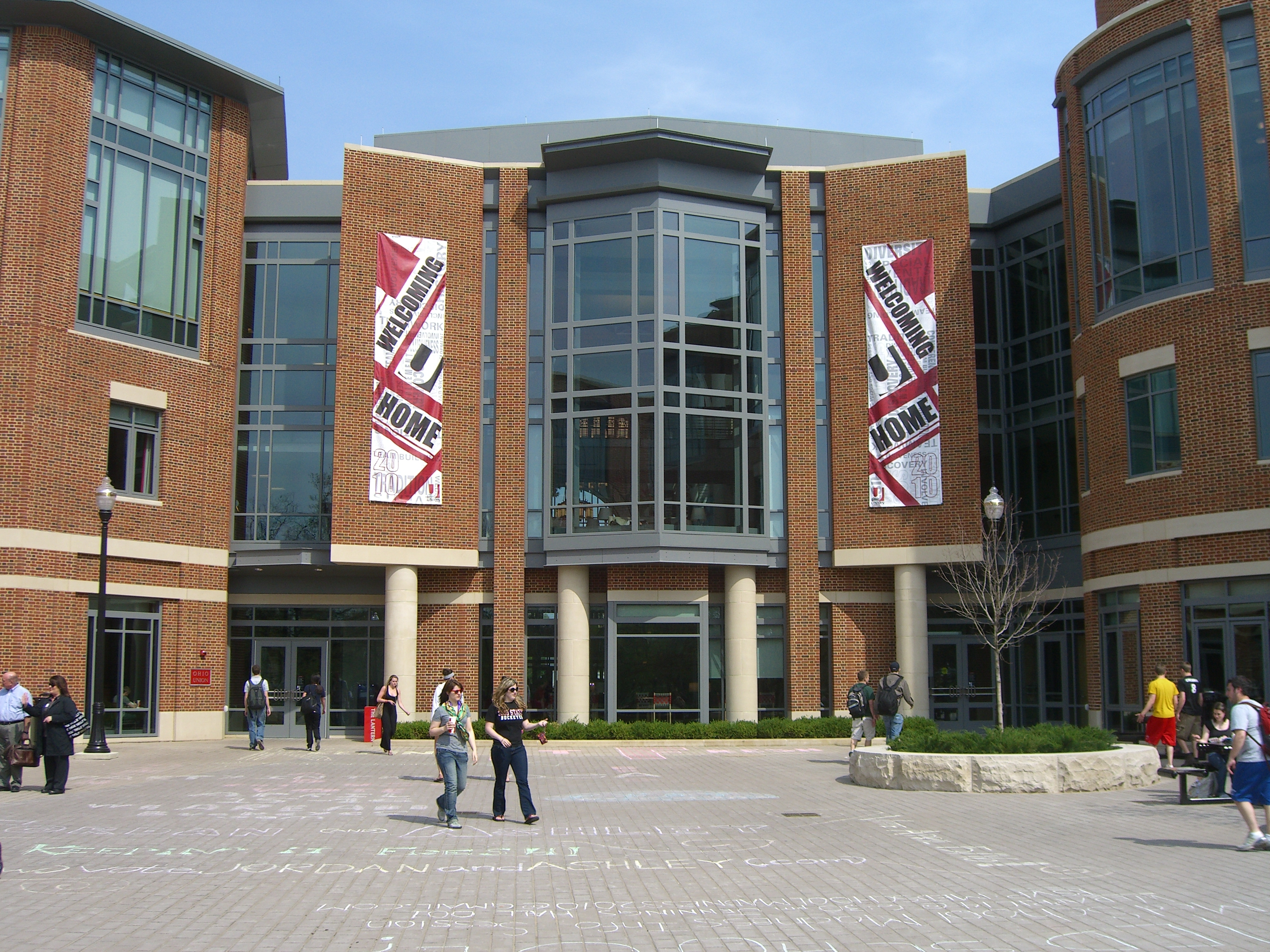
- The Ohio Union
- Interactive map of the Ohio Union area
- Alternative names: The Union

General information
- Type: Student activity center with ballroom and theater
- Architectural style: Postmodern
- Location: Ohio State University, Columbus, Ohio, USA
- Coordinates: 39.998361°N 83.00776°W
- Completed: 2010
- Inaugurated: March 29, 2010

Technical details
- Floor count: 3

Website
- ohiounion.osu.edu

The Ohio Union serves as a student activity center for students of Ohio State University. When the Union was established in 1910, it was the first student union at a public university. The Ohio Union provides facilities for student activities, organizations/events, and campus and community interaction. Many student services and programs are housed in the union, along with dining and recreational facilities. On March 29, 2010, the current Ohio Union was opened to the public, replacing three previous unions.

== History ==
=== Enarson Hall (1910–1951) ===
The Ohio Union was originally located in Enarson Hall (now called Hale Hall) when it first opened in 1910. The 77th Ohio General Assembly provided $75,000 for the construction of the Union. The Union remained at this location until 1951. It was officially named the "Ohio Union" on October 29, 1909, and was the first student union at a public university.

The Union was initially only open to male students, but female students were allowed to use the Union once per week on "Ladies' Day". As a result, maintenance and user fees were only charged to male students.

In 1913, Ohio State University hired Edward S. Drake as the manager of the union. He supported many student organizations, including Phi Sigma Kappa and the student honoraries Romophos, Bucket and Dipper, and Sphinx, during his service. Drake managed the Union for 33 years before retiring in 1946. The Drake Performance and Event Center was named in his honor. A bronze bust of Drake is on display in the current Ohio Union to commemorate his contributions to the University.

In 1921, the second floor of the Union was used by the Ohio Stadium building committee.

During World War I, the Ohio Union was used as a mess hall and recreational center for quartered troops who lived on campus.

=== Pomerene Hall (1922–1951) ===
In the early years of the Union, only men enrolled at the University were permitted to enter. Since few women attended the university in the early 1900s, a student union for women was deemed unnecessary. A small room in University Hall was used as the women's social center. It was nicknamed the "Gab Room" and maintained by the Ohio State Women's Council at the time. Women paid a 25 cent yearly membership fee to use the room. As more women started to attend the university, it became clear that the small room in University Hall was insufficient. The Women's Council came before the Board of Trustees and demanded money for the construction of a new union. The Board of Trustees denied the women the funds for a new union space, believing funds should be reserved for academics. The Board instead advised them to bring the matter to the University legislature. The Women's Council then launched a campaign to raise support for a women's student union. Their hard work paid off, and $150,000 was allocated for the construction of a new women's building. However, construction was delayed because there was a University ban on any type of building construction until after the end of the First World War. After the war was over, another $90,000 was allocated for the construction of the building. By the time construction was ready to proceed, though, the $240,000 allocated was found to be insufficient. It was then decided that the building would be built in two different phases, the first ending in 1919, which included a gymnasium and a social center. The second phase was completed in 1927 and included an indoor swimming pool, lounges, cafeteria and a kitchen for the women. Today, this building is used for the Translational Data Analytics Institute, classrooms, offices and a campus dining area, Mirror Lake Eatery.

=== The Ohio Union (1951–2006) ===
In January 1947, the students of the Ohio State University came together and petitioned for a new union that allowed equal access for men and women. The students were so passionate about the project that the students themselves contributed both ideas and funds towards the new union. Construction of the student 'Dream Union' started in June 1949 and completed two years later in 1951. This Union housed a dining room, two ballrooms, a browsing library, music lounge, pool tables, a 16-lane bowling alley and nineteen offices used for various student organizations. As the decades passed, the Union accommodated the needs of the students accordingly. In 1985, as technology was advancing and the creation of the computer evolved, a micro-computer lab was made in the Union to help students with research and various studies.

As time passed, the success of the union made it difficult to maintain the aging building, and by the late 1980s, the Union began to lose its charisma to students. A 1986 study found that about $10 million would need to be spent by 1994 to fix the plumbing, roofing and heating system in the union. In 1994 there were plans to renovate the Union, but those plans were defeated in 1996 by a student referendum. Rebecca Park, Director 1994–2001, unable to address the structural issues, instead focused on student programming at the Union, and Tracy Stuck, Director 2001–2010, merged the Office of Student Activities with the Ohio Union staff to support the Union's mission of providing students with the best services and activities and brought a Buckeye theme back to the building by making aesthetic changes and adding scarlet and gray into the décor.

In the 2003–2004 academic year, the three student governments at Ohio State started a campaign to advocate for the construction of a new building. To help with the student's campaign, Union staff presented a 'road-show' exhibit to different residence halls, student organizations, and interested students. Finally, in June 2004, the Ohio State Board of Trustees approved plans to tear down the old Union and start the construction of a new building on the same site. The old Union was torn down in 2006 and construction of the new Union began one month later.

== The New Ohio Union (2010–Present) ==
The new Ohio Union, completed in 2010, now serves as Ohio State's center for dining, recreation, meetings, and events. Students at Ohio State helped to decide much of the design aspects of the Union, such as color schemes, types of furniture, and the architectural design of the building. Ohio State partnered with Habitat for Humanity during the demolition of the old Union and donated the useful parts of the building to them. The new Union is a LEED Silver Certified Green Building and has also been issued an official GreenSpot by the City of Columbus.

Currently, the Ohio Union is home to four dining areas: Woody's Tavern, Union Market, Espress O-H, and Sloopy's Diner. A number of offices are housed in the Ohio Union, including BuckID, Student Life, the Keith B. Key Center for Student Leadership and Service, and the Willie J. Young, Sr. Off-Campus and Commuter Student Engagement office. There is also a branch of US Bank, and a Barnes & Noble campus bookstore inside of the building. Students and organizations have access to a variety of spaces within the building that can be used for events.

== Directors of the Ohio Union ==
- 1908: Aaron Cohn "Father of the Ohio Union"
- 1913: Edward S. "Beanie" Drake
- 1958–83: Wendell Ellenwood
- 1983–88: John Ellinger
- 1994–2001: Rebecca Parker
- 2001–2010: Tracy Stuck
- 2010–2016: Eve Esch
- 2016 – Present: Jeff Pelletier

== Gallery ==
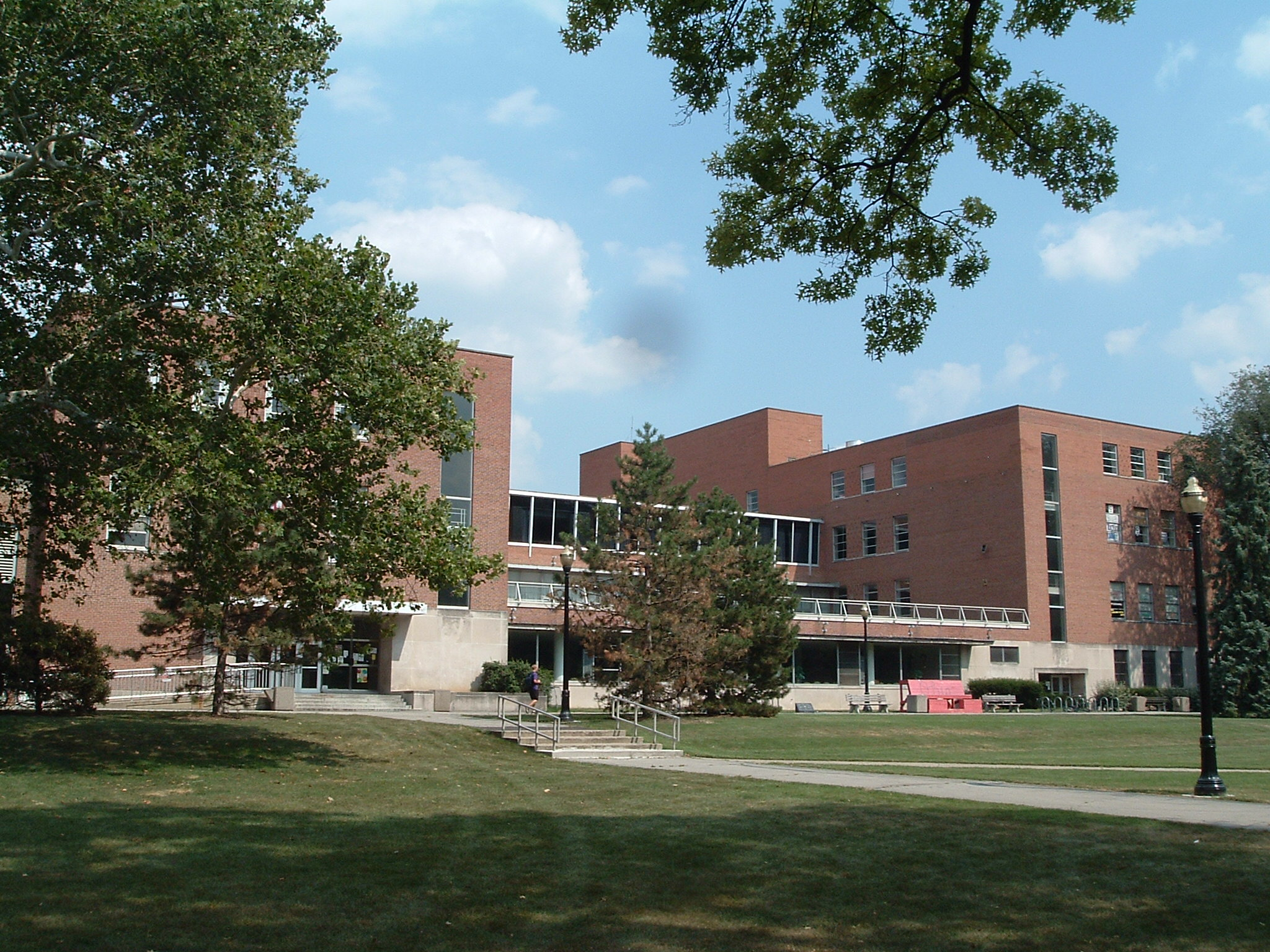
The 1951 Ohio Union building, now demolished

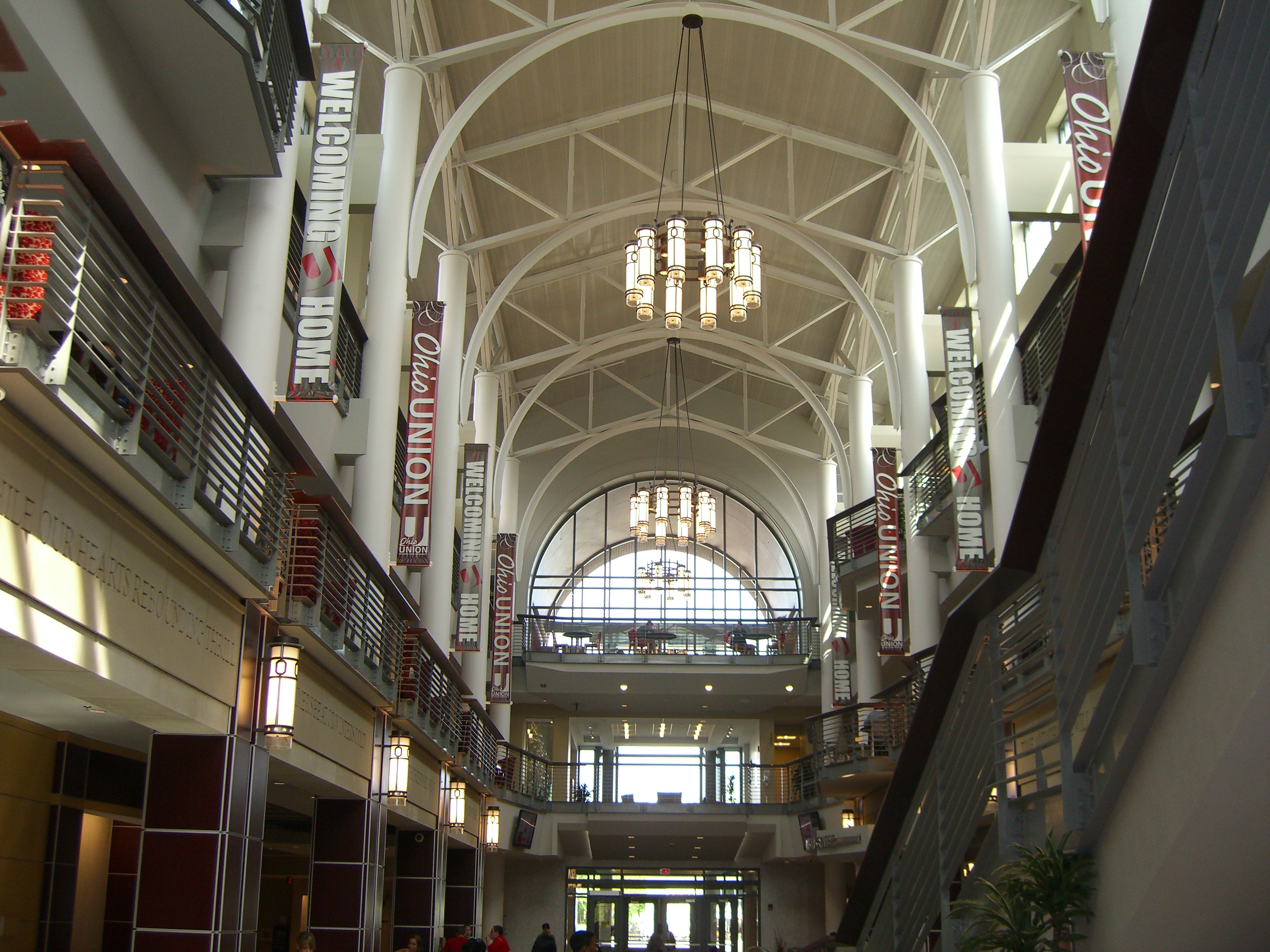
Arched ceiling in the 2010 building

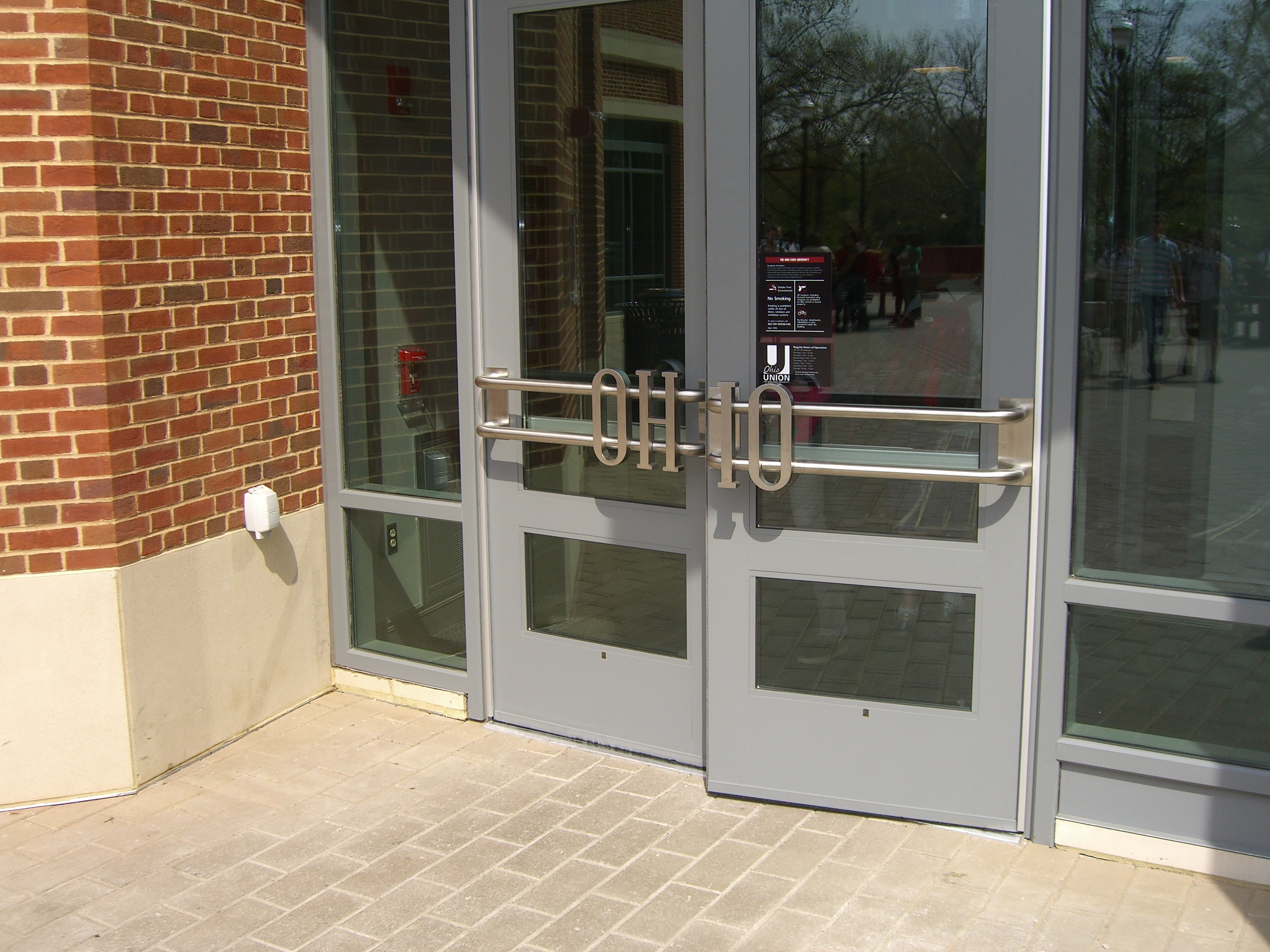
Stylized door handles at the entrance to the 2010 building
