= Drake Performance and Event Center =

Student activity center at Ohio State University in Columbus, OH, US

Coordinates: 39.999303°N 83.023195°W

Ohio State University Drake Performance and Event Center
- The Drake, Drake
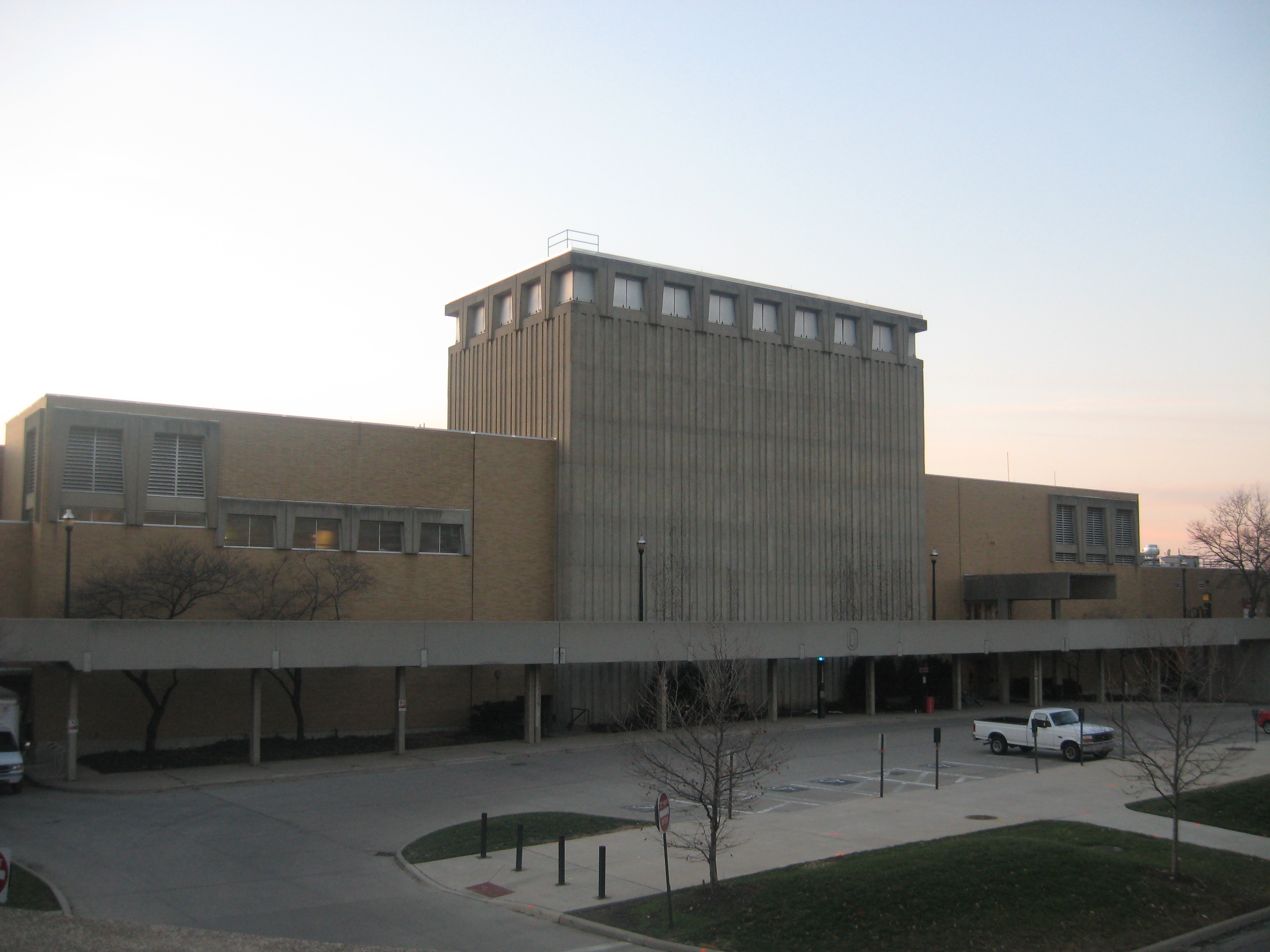
- Drake Center shown here on the West Campus of the Ohio State University
- Interactive map of the Ohio State University; Drake Performance and Event Center area
- Former names: Drake Union

General information
- Completed: 1971
- Demolished: November 2023

Design and construction
- Architect: Todd Tibbals

The Drake Performance and Event Center was located at Ohio State University. Formerly known as the Drake Union, it was originally constructed as a student activity center before becoming home to the Department of Theater. The center was located on the west campus of Ohio State between Morrill Tower and Lincoln Tower off the east banks of the Olentangy River.

== Background ==
With the construction of residence halls on west campus, Ohio State students living there found the walking distance to travel to the Ohio Union long, especially in the winter. The Board of Trustees approved the construction of a second union in 1969. Designed by architect Todd Tibbals, the union was officially named after Edward S. Drake, a former manager at the Ohio Union for 33 years, in 1971 and officially opened in 1972 at a cost of $4.5 million. Following the construction, there were plans to build additional structures surrounding Drake Union, but those plans were cancelled. Although it would appear Drake Union would rival the existing Ohio Union as Ohio State's second union, both unions worked together as community centers for students and visitors.

== Uses ==
Drake Center housed the Department of Theater at Ohio State. The center offered Buckeye TV and houses The Ohio State University's on-campus marina. The center once housed Archie's Alley, which included bowling alleys, pool tables, and a bar, but closed in 1999 due to low patronage.

== Demolition ==
In 2023, the Department of Theatre, Film, and Media Arts moved to a new building on the corner of West 18th Avenue and College Road. Following the move to the new building, Drake Union was demolished in November to make room for a new green space and riverfront commons along the Olentangy River.
