= Colonial Hills Christian School =

Location
- Lithia Springs, Georgia; United States
- 33°46′52″N 84°38′18″W

Information
- School type: Private
- Established: 1959
- Grades: K-12
- Website: www.chrams.org

Colonial Hills Christian School was a private Christian school located in East Point and Lithia Springs, Georgia, United States. The school was founded in 1959 and was affiliated with the Colonial Hills Baptist Church.

== History ==
=== Establishment ===
The Colonial Hills Christian School was established in East Point, Georgia, in the fall of 1959. During its debut 1959–60 academic year the school offered elementary classes running from 1st to 4th grade. This was expanded for the 1960–61 academic year to include 5th and 6th grade classes. By the time of its fourth year in existence, 7th grade classes were offered.

The school eventually came to be housed in a three building complex and to offer classes from kindergarten through 12th grade.

The school offered a broad curriculum for an institution of its size, with classes including calculus and physics as well as band and team sports.

=== Decline and relocation ===
School enrollment eventually peaked at about 500 students but began to attenuate during the 1980s — a decline paralleled by a fall in membership of the Colonial Hills Baptist Church, the sponsoring religious entity. A change of locations was deemed necessary and a number of neighboring counties were ruled out due to the presence of Christian schools there. A new home was eventually found in Lithia Springs, located in Douglas County. A satellite campus was established there in 1993 in anticipation of the move.

At the end of the 1994–95 school year, the buildings which comprised the East Point campus were sold, as was the sanctuary of the Colonial Hills Baptist Church, with an organization called Wings of Faith Church taking over the old church building.

Enrollment during the 1994-95 academic year was down to about 250 — just half of the school's peak. Despite this the school still maintained athletic teams in football, softball, and other sports.

Following the move bus service was offered to East Point students who sought to attend the school at its new Lithia Springs location.

=== Closure ===
Colonial Hills Christian School closed in 2017.
