= Colonial Hills =

Coordinates: 40°4′8″N 83°0′40″W

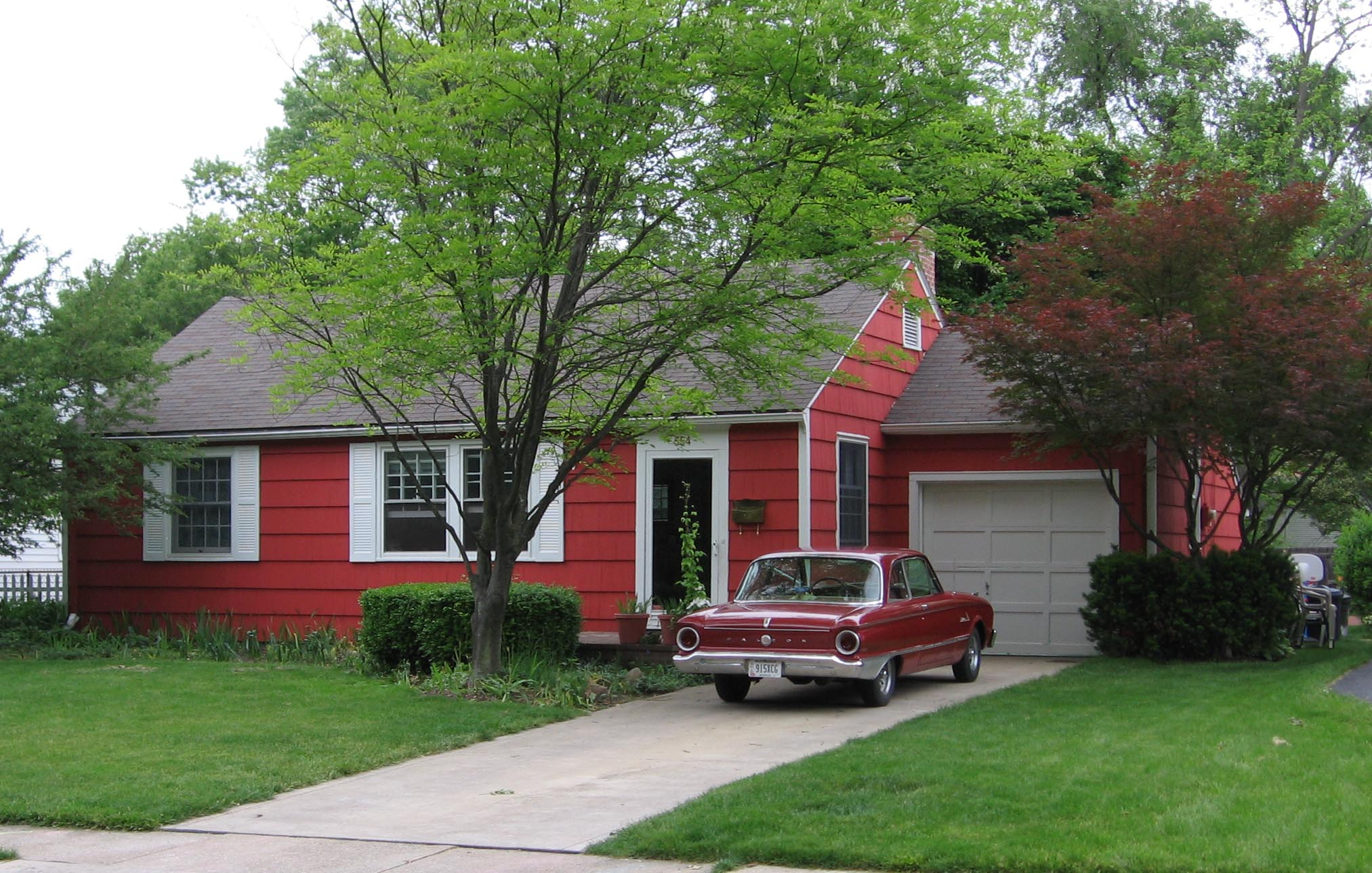
Original single story government-built Colonial Hills home. Nine variations on this style were built on North and South Selby and Kenbrook Drive in 1942 to house defense workers, primarily at the Curtis-Wright Aviation Plant near the Columbus Airport.

Colonial Hills is a subdivision of 873 single-family homes located in the city of Worthington, Ohio, a northern suburb of the state capital, Columbus. Built by the Defense Homes Corporation to meet the needs of World War II production and the post-war boom, it continues to be a viable community today.

== History ==
Colonial Hills was constructed in the early 1940s, but plans to build a subdivision there date to the great real estate boom of the 1920s. It took the involvement of the federal government and the demands for war housing to move the project into reality.

=== Early settlement ===
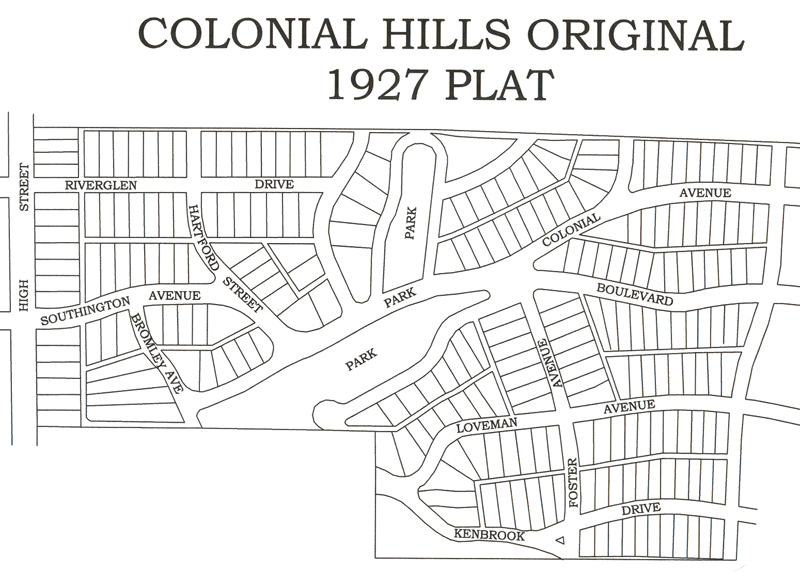
Initial design for Colonial Hills, October 11, 1927

The modern history of the land that Colonial Hills is built on began with the Northwest Ordinance of July 13, 1787. Congress established government for the Northwest Territory, a region that included the future states of Ohio, Indiana, Illinois, Michigan and Wisconsin. The ordinance also outlawed slavery in the region. On June 1, 1796, the Congress established a U.S. Military District to satisfy land claims of revolutionary war veterans. This included the northern half of the future Franklin County. In 1797, Israel Ludlow surveyed the Military Lands and divided them into townships 5 miles (8.0 km) square. Colonial Hills would be located in Sharon Township until its annexation to Worthington in the 1950s. Beginning with the settlement of Worthington in 1803, the land became a farm lot. It remained a farm until 1942 when construction of houses began.

The initial subdivision was titled Colonial Hills and was platted on October 11, 1927, by the Jennings-Lawrence Company, This initial plat consisted of only Riverglen Drive, Southington Avenue, Colonial Avenue, Park Boulevard, Meadoway, Loveman Avenue and Kenbrook Drive. These plans remained shelved until February 18, 1940, when a colonial style model home was opened to the public at 36 East Southington Avenue as part of the 1940 Model Home Show of Columbus. Due to the depression, however, private individuals did not possess the resources to buy new houses and the development remained stalled. The homes that the Federal Government financed in 1942 were much less elaborate than 36 East Southington Avenue.

=== United States Federal Government intervention ===
In the fall of 1941, the Federal Government recognized that there was a lack of suitable housing for executives engaged in war production in Columbus, and began a search for an appropriate place to construct such homes. The Defense Homes Corporation chose the vacant Colonial Hills site and chose Overland Realty to act as its agent. The 1925 plat was modified to add Selby Boulevard, Selby Park and Indianola Park. Most of the original Plat, excepting Kenbrook Drive, was shelved as a phase II development to be built later. Curiously, the name was changed to the more elaborate Colonial Hills and Dales. The initial 200 homes were located on Selby Boulevard, North Selby, South Selby and Kenbrook Drive. Ten homes on the west side of Indianola Avenue were also part of the initial build, 5493, 5503, 5515, 5531, 5539, 5547, 5555, 5571, 5579 and 5587. This plat shows Kenbrook Drive bisecting Indianola Park. Apparently during the expansion after the war it was decided to terminate Kenbrook Drive at Indianola Avenue and extend Indianola Park farther north.

Also note the presence of alleys. These were designed to be 16 feet (4.9 m) wide to provide access to utilities and provide a place for residents to burn their trash. The alleys were taken out of service in the 1950s by Worthington City Ordinance 117–57. Presumably, with annexation to Worthington, trash pickup began and the alleys were no longer needed. The alleys were divided and attached to their adjacent properties. Some fences still follow the old alley edges.

=== Architecture & project cost ===
A young architect, Todd Tibbals, with offices at 15 N. High Street in downtown Columbus was chosen to design the homes. Nine styles of home were designed to be replicated throughout the initial order of 200 homes. The project was budgeted at $1,250,000.

=== Construction ===
The houses were actually prefabricated off site and delivered in pieces by the New York Central railroad to the Potter Lumber company at State Route 161 and Proprietors Road. They were trucked to the site and installed.

To save time and money while building military bases and offices, the U.S. Government turned to the United States Gypsum corporation for a product dating from 1916 called sheetrock. Before the war, American homes were routinely plastered inside—a painstaking process that could consume weeks where no other trade could work inside the house. Despite the expense and labor intensity of plastering, and the successful use of sheetrock in most of the buildings at the Chicago's World's Fair of 1933–34, sheetrock had not caught on. But the urgencies of wartime construction changed all that (Gellner, 2003). Colonial Hills and Dales was one of the first sites in the nation to utilize sheetrock rather than plaster construction.

Construction was well underway by January, 1942. The work site included a lunch room for the 400 workers. By October 1942, two homes were sufficiently completed to be opened to the public for inspection although landscaping had yet to be completed.

=== Racial restrictions ===
The deed restrictions for the subdivision dated December 24, 1938 contained this clause (restrictive covenant):

No part of said addition or any building thereon shall be owned, leased to, or occupied by, any person other than one of the Caucasian race, but this prohibition is not intended to exclude or prevent occupancy by such other persons as domestic servants of any resident of said addition...

This restriction was placed in the deed before Colonial Hills became a government funded project, but no effort was ever made to remove it. Indeed, in the August 28, 1942 deed drawn up by the Defense Homes Corporation and Overland Realty the restriction remains. The restriction was nullified by the Federal Fair Housing Act of April 11, 1968.

=== The first homes are occupied ===
The assembly line style of construction and modern techniques such as the use of sheetrock meant houses were finished quickly. By the spring of 1943, 58 of the 200 units were occupied. Colonial Hills was built in an assembly line fashion that predated Levittown by five years.

The homes remained rental units throughout the war. Many of the tenants held white collar jobs at the Curtis Wright Aviation Plant located at the airport.

=== After World War II ===
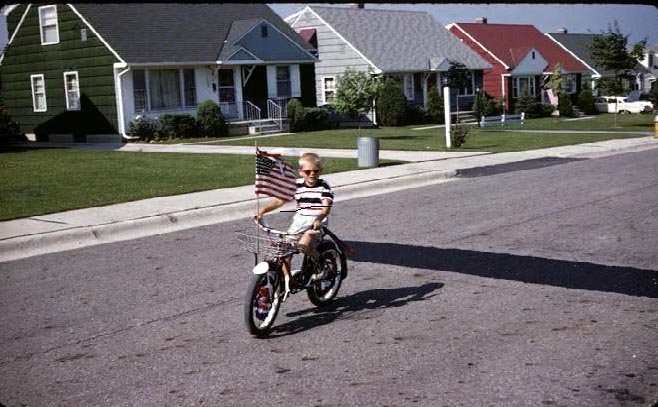
Typical second-phase Colonial Hills homes built in the early 1950s. Unlike the first phase, these homes have basements and second stories. Aluminum windows also made their debut. John Snouffer has decorated his bike for the 1959 Independence Day parade. This is the south side of Loveman Avenue just west of Greenwich Street.

At the end of the war, all the homes on Selby and Kenbrook were sold for $6000 to $8000 to current residents and returning veterans, and later, to others. Many were bought by investors and remained rentals well into the 1950s.

The demand for postwar housing caused the Overland Realty Co. to dust off the 1927 plat. On August 8, 1946, this plat was slightly modified to connect Kenbrook and Loveman together in a "U" shape at the western end of those streets. The original plat had the two streets merging, much as North and South Selby do, and then the merged street, named Bromley Avenue, would proceed through the Kenyon Brook subdivision to Southington Avenue. This change accounts for the relatively large lot sizes around the circle at the end of Lake Ridge Road.

An additional 645 lots were added to Colonial Hills and construction ran through the early 1950s. Many of these new homes featured two story design, basements and aluminum framed windows. This brought the size of Colonial Hills to over 800 families with an eventual population of 3,100.

=== Civic Association and annexation to Worthington ===
Some time thereafter, the name of the development was shortened, once again, to Colonial Hills. In 1946 the Colonial Hills Civic Association was established. It was incorporated in 1952, the same year some residents of Colonial Hills began seeking annexation to the village of Worthington.

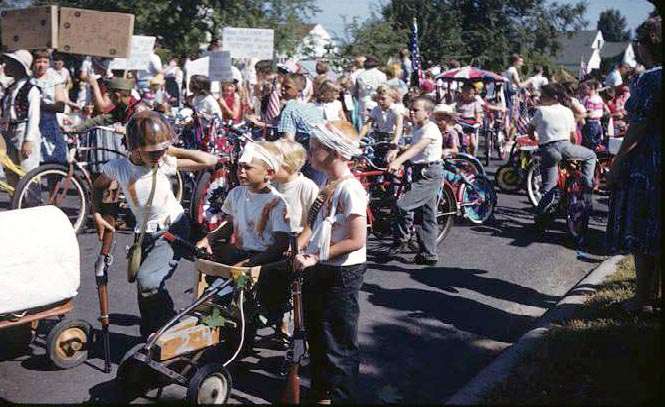
July 4, 1959 Independence Day parade proceeding along Andover Street near Kenbrook Drive towards Selby Park. A major theme of that year's parade was the addition of Alaska and Hawaii to the Union.

Sharon Township was being rapidly converted from farmland to higher value retail and housing development. Both Columbus and Worthington wanted to add this valuable new property to their cities. Deciding between remaining part of the township, annexing to Columbus or annexing to Worthington was difficult. Tax rates in Columbus were $20 per $1000 of valued property, while the township was charging $26.20 and in Worthington, $29.20. The typical taxpayer in Colonial Hills paid $200 in annual property tax.

Concerned about the cost of providing services to Colonial Hills, many of Worthington's 2000 residents fought the annexation for two years until November 2, 1954, when Colonial Hills was annexed to Worthington. This increased the population of Worthington to more than 5000, and changed its status from Village to City. Colonial Hills Elementary School was promptly constructed and opened in 1955.

From the 1950s until at least the late 1970s, Colonial Hills hosted a July Fourth celebration that was a major event for the north side of Columbus. A parade with hundreds of children in costume, floats and horse-drawn wagons made its way along Andover to Selby Park, where tents were set up. Fireworks at Indianola Park followed.

=== Appearance of highways ===
Prior to the completion of Interstate 70 and Interstate 71 across Ohio, the City of Columbus began construction expressways that would link to the new Interstate System. The portion of Interstate 71 that bounds Worthington's eastern edge was called The North Freeway, cost 13.8 million dollars, and was constructed south from State Route 161, arriving at 11th avenue by August, 1961. It took a year to get from 11th Avenue to 5th Avenue, mostly due to the need to construct a massive underpass under the Pennsylvania Railroad's Grogan Yard. Ironically, today only two tracks cross the viaduct, the rest of the structure supports a large, weedy field. By August 1962, the freeway had reached Fifth Avenue, and reached downtown in November 1962. It wasn't until 1966 that I-71 was complete between Cincinnati and Cleveland.

I-270 (the Outerbelt) was proposed in the early 1960s with the north section to be routed through the deaf school just north of Graceland Shopping Center. This proposal was fought by residents of Clintonville and Beechwold through 1961. In October, 1961, after an extensive letter writing campaign by local residents, Ohio Governor Michael DiSalle announced that the freeway would be built north of Worthington. In August, 1967, the first section of Outerbelt between North High Street and I-71 opened. The outerbelt was finally completed in August, 1975 at a total cost of 150 million dollars.

State Route 315 was the most contentious of the area's freeways, and its construction was not completed until 1981. Its construction involved relocating the Olentangy River between the Outerbelt and 161.

=== Today ===
Today, few of the original homes remain unmodified, as their value has justified extensive remodeling. The combined property value of six Colonial Hills homes would exceed the $1,250,000 spent to construct the original 200, a testament to the decision-making process of the Defense Homes Corporation over sixty years ago.
