= East Point, Georgia =

City in Georgia, United States

- City
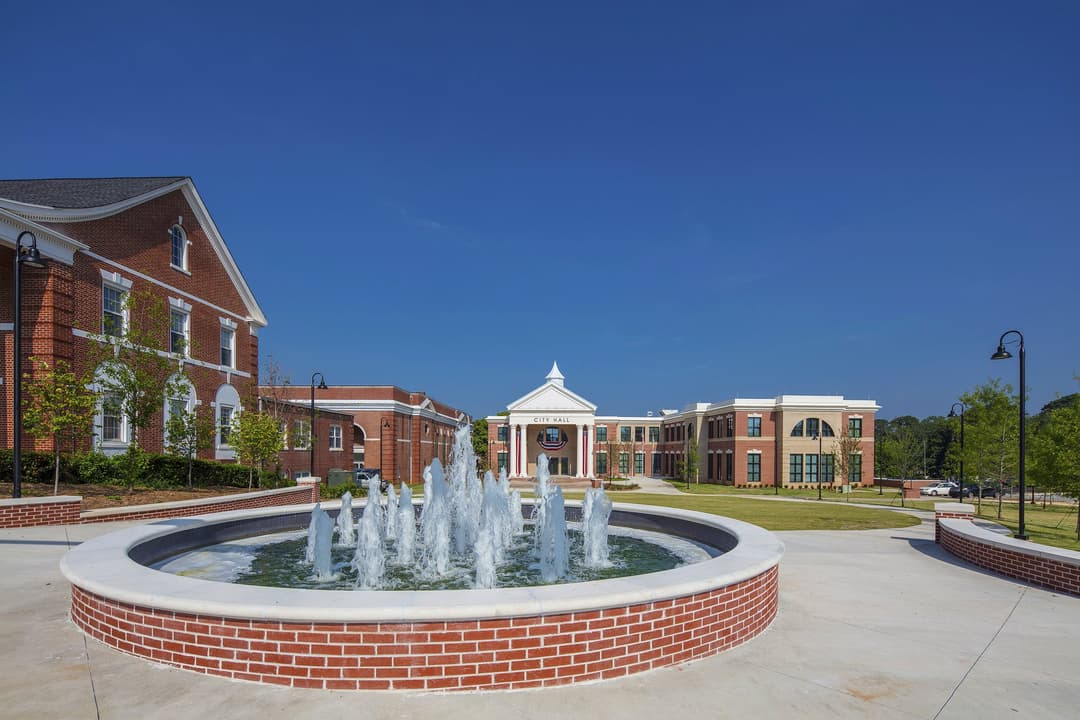
- East Point City Hall

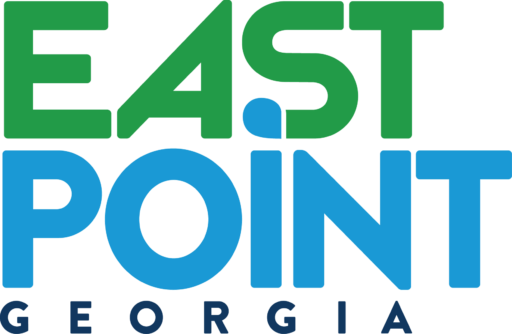
- Logo
- Interactive map of East Point, Georgia
- Coordinates: 33°40′11″N 84°28′12″W
- Country: United States
- State: Georgia
- County: Fulton

Government
  - Mayor: Keisha Chapman

Area
  - Total: 14.70 sq mi (38.08 km^{2})
  - Land: 14.69 sq mi (38.04 km^{2})
  - Water: 0.015 sq mi (0.04 km^{2})
- Elevation: 961 ft (293 m)

Population (2020)
  - Total: 38,358
  - Density: 2,611.3/sq mi (1,008.24/km^{2})
- Time zone: UTC-5 (Eastern (EST))
  - Summer (DST): UTC-4 (EDT)
- ZIP codes: 30344, 30364
- Area code: 404
- FIPS code: 13-25720
- GNIS feature ID: 2403534
- Website: https://eastpointga.gov/

East Point is a suburban city located southwest of Atlanta in Fulton County, Georgia, United States. As of the 2020 census, the city had a population of 38,358. The city name is derived from being at the opposite end of the former Atlanta and West Point Railroad from West Point.

== History ==
The name "East Point" derives from the fact that this is the terminus of the Atlanta & West Point Railroad in the east; West Point, Georgia, is the terminus where the rail line ends in the west.

This settlement was founded as a railroad terminus with 16 families in 1870, but grew quickly after it became an inviting place for industry to develop. Soon it boasted the railway, two gristmills, and a government distillery located on Connally Drive. One of the earliest buildings was the factory of the White Hickory Manufacturing Company, built by B.M. Blount and L.M. Hill (who became the first chairman of the board of aldermen of the city).

By 1880 the town had two churches, a common school, a steam-cotton gin, a sawmill, a post office (founded in 1851), a telegraph office and its own newspaper weekly, The Plow Boy. East Point ranked as a grain and cotton-growing center. With its pleasant upland climate and proximity to the railway, it was a popular summer resort for people from the city of Atlanta.

In 1884 the first telephone rang in East Point, and in 1887 the city received its first charter. In 1890 a major portion of property along East Point Avenue was subdivided and developed, opening the way for more homes, more churches, more people, and more places of employment. By 1892 Main Street was completed, despite protests from a few progress-shy early settlers who maintained that one major thoroughfare, Newnan Road, was more than sufficient.

By the start of the 20th century, the adolescent town was poised to grow into the city it eventually would become.

In late 2015 and early 2016, some scenes for the Netflix series Stranger Things were filmed at the exterior of the First Baptist Church (standing in for a hospital exterior in a fictional Indiana town).

The recording studio of Dungeon Family was originally located in East Point, and contributed to the development of Atlanta hip hop.

== Geography ==
East Point is bordered to the north, east, and west by the city of Atlanta, to the southeast by Hapeville, and to the south by College Park. Downtown Atlanta is 7 miles (11 km) northeast of the center of East Point.

According to the United States Census Bureau, East Point has a total area of 14.7 square miles (38.1 km^{2}), of which 0.02 square miles (0.05 km^{2}), or 0.12%, is water.

== Demographics ==
Historical population
Census	Pop.	Note	%±
1880	195		—
1890	738		278.5%
1900	1,315		78.2%
1910	3,682		180.0%
1920	5,241		42.3%
1930	9,512		81.5%
1940	12,403		30.4%
1950	21,080		70.0%
1960	35,633		69.0%
1970	39,315		10.3%
1980	37,486		−4.7%
1990	34,402		−8.2%
2000	39,595		15.1%
2010	33,712		−14.9%
2020	38,358		13.8%
2025 (est.)	38,225	▼	−0.3%
U.S. Decennial Census; 1850-1870 1870-1880; 1890-1910 1920-1930; 1940 1950 1960; 1970 1980 1990; 2000 2010; 2025

=== Racial and ethnic composition ===
East Point city, Georgia – Racial and ethnic composition Note: the US Census treats Hispanic/Latino as an ethnic category. This table excludes Latinos from the racial categories and assigns them to a separate category. Hispanics/Latinos may be of any race.
Race / Ethnicity (NH = Non-Hispanic)	Pop 2000	Pop 2010	Pop 2020	% 2000	% 2010	% 2020
White alone (NH)	5,135	3,978	3,527	12.97%	11.80%	9.19%
Black or African American alone (NH)	30,728	24,924	29,156	77.61%	73.93%	76.01%
Native American or Alaska Native alone (NH)	59	94	74	0.15%	0.28%	0.19%
Asian alone (NH)	242	266	250	0.61%	0.79%	0.65%
Native Hawaiian or Pacific Islander alone (NH)	11	11	11	0.03%	0.03%	0.03%
Other race alone (NH)	41	38	211	0.10%	0.11%	0.55%
Mixed race or Multiracial (NH)	381	511	1,085	0.96%	1.52%	2.83%
Hispanic or Latino (any race)	2,998	3,890	4,044	7.57%	11.54%	10.54%
Total	39,595	33,712	38,358	100.00%	100.00%	100.00%

=== 2020 census ===
As of the 2020 census, East Point had a population of 38,358. The median age was 35.0 years. 22.8% of residents were under the age of 18 and 12.7% of residents were 65 years of age or older. For every 100 females there were 89.3 males, and for every 100 females age 18 and over there were 87.0 males age 18 and over.

100.0% of residents lived in urban areas, while 0.0% lived in rural areas.

There were 15,993 households in East Point, including 6,721 families. Of all households, 28.6% had children under the age of 18 living in them. 22.0% were married-couple households, 26.9% were households with a male householder and no spouse or partner present, and 42.4% were households with a female householder and no spouse or partner present. About 35.7% of all households were made up of individuals and 9.2% had someone living alone who was 65 years of age or older.

There were 17,945 housing units, of which 10.9% were vacant. The homeowner vacancy rate was 3.0% and the rental vacancy rate was 8.9%.

=== 2000 census ===
In 2000, the median income for a household in the city was $31,874, and the median income for a family was $36,099. Males had a median income of $27,114 versus $25,839 for females. The per capita income for the city was $15,175. About 17.2% of families and 20.7% of the population were below the poverty line, including 30.0% of those under age 18 and 13.6% of those age 65 or over.

== Economy ==
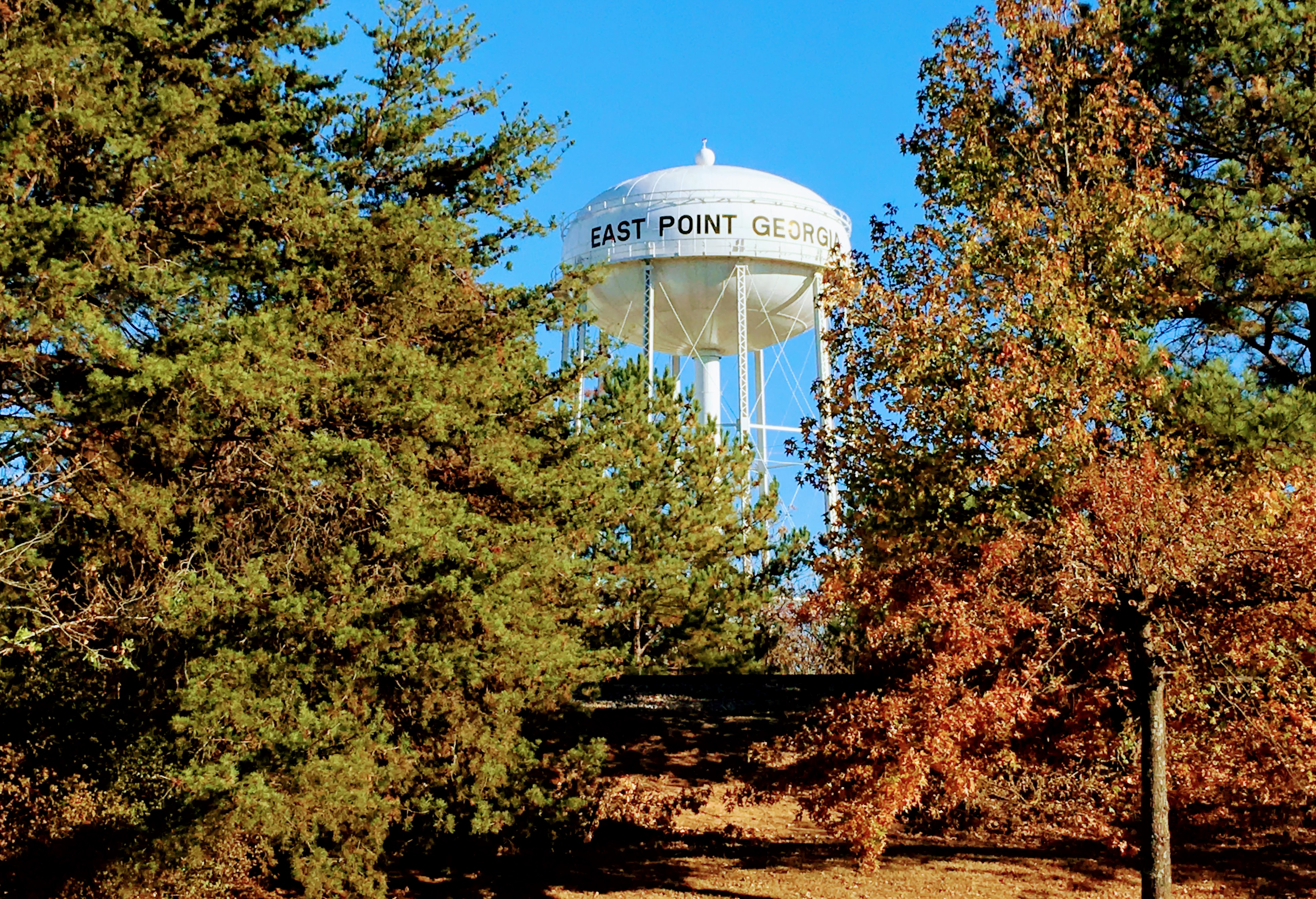
Water tower

The National Archives and Records Administration regional repository for data collected by the U.S. Census was originally located in the Colonial Hills area of East Point, before moving to Morrow, Georgia.

The Southeast Region Office of the Federal Bureau of Prisons is in East Point.

In the late 20th century, East Point suffered a loss of jobs due to railroad and industrial restructuring. In the 21st century, its economy expanded, and new businesses and residences developed. The city states that "several Fortune 500 companies" are located in East Point.

== Arts and culture ==
East Point Historic Civic Block consists of three historically significant buildings and one memorial park in downtown East Point.

Opened in 2003, Camp Creek Marketplace is a 309,089-square-foot (29,000 m^{2}) retail space, containing 39 stores and 14 restaurants.

The Commons is a $150 million, 79,000-square-foot (7,300 m^{2}), retail, restaurant, and residential development expected to bring over 1,500 jobs to East Point, with an estimated completion between 2027 and 2029.

Atlanta–Fulton Public Library System operates the East Point Branch.

== Parks and recreation ==
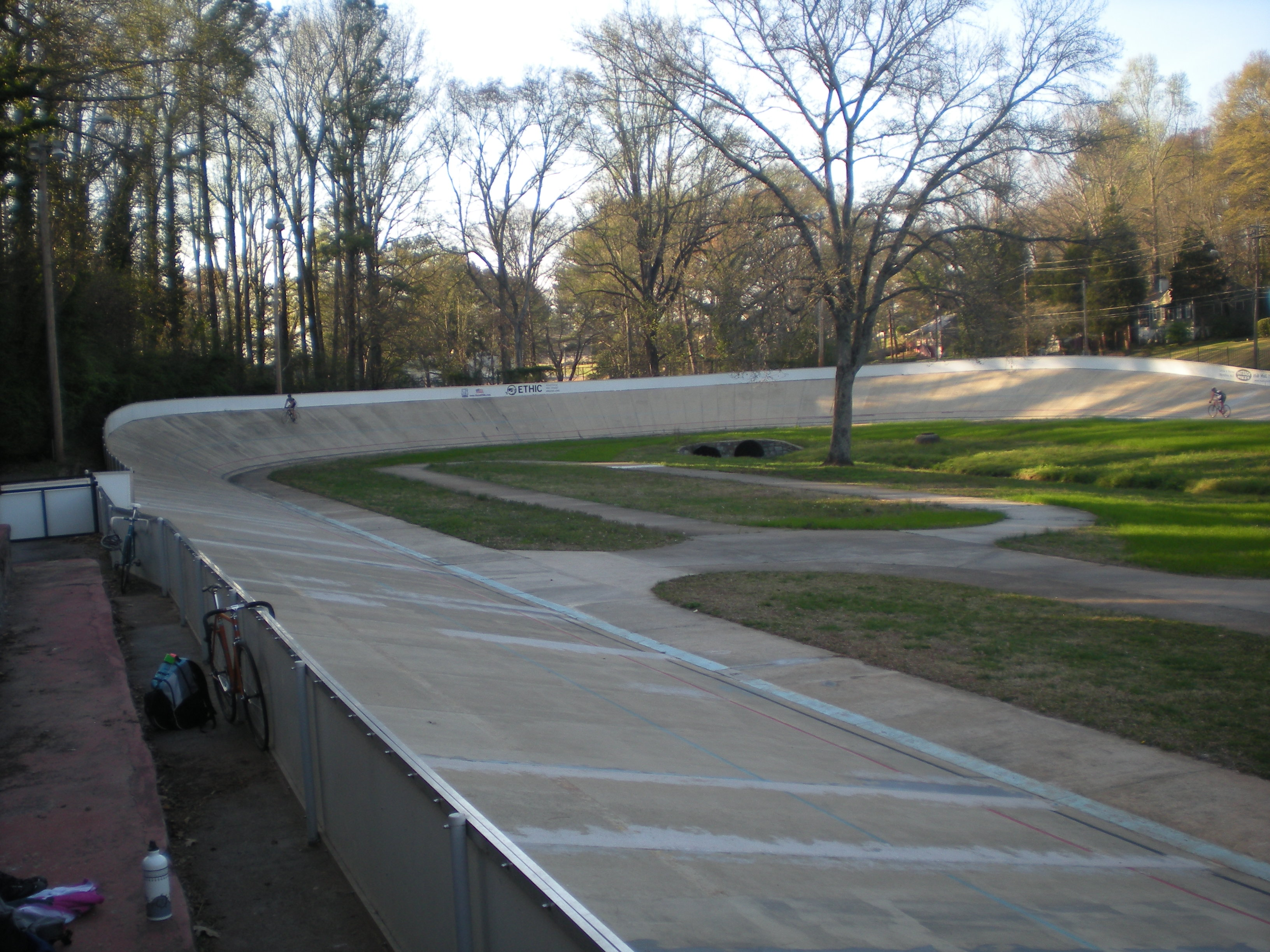
Dick Lane Velodrome

East Point has 23 parks, a recreation center, playgrounds, tennis courts, sand volleyball, basketball courts, trails, and recreational activities and programs.

Connally Nature Park is a 27-acre (11 ha) green space that features pink lady slipper orchids which blossom in spring, and white oak trees.

Dick Lane Velodrome in Sumner Park, built in 1974, is one of 22 velodromes in the United States, and was a training facility for the 1996 Summer Olympics in Atlanta. It hosts cycling events and competitions.

== Government ==
The city has a city council-city manager form of government, with a professional city manager hired by the council. The manager is approved by the eight-member city council, headed by the mayor who has veto power. The city is divided into four wards (A, B, C, & D), each electing two city council members.

== Education ==
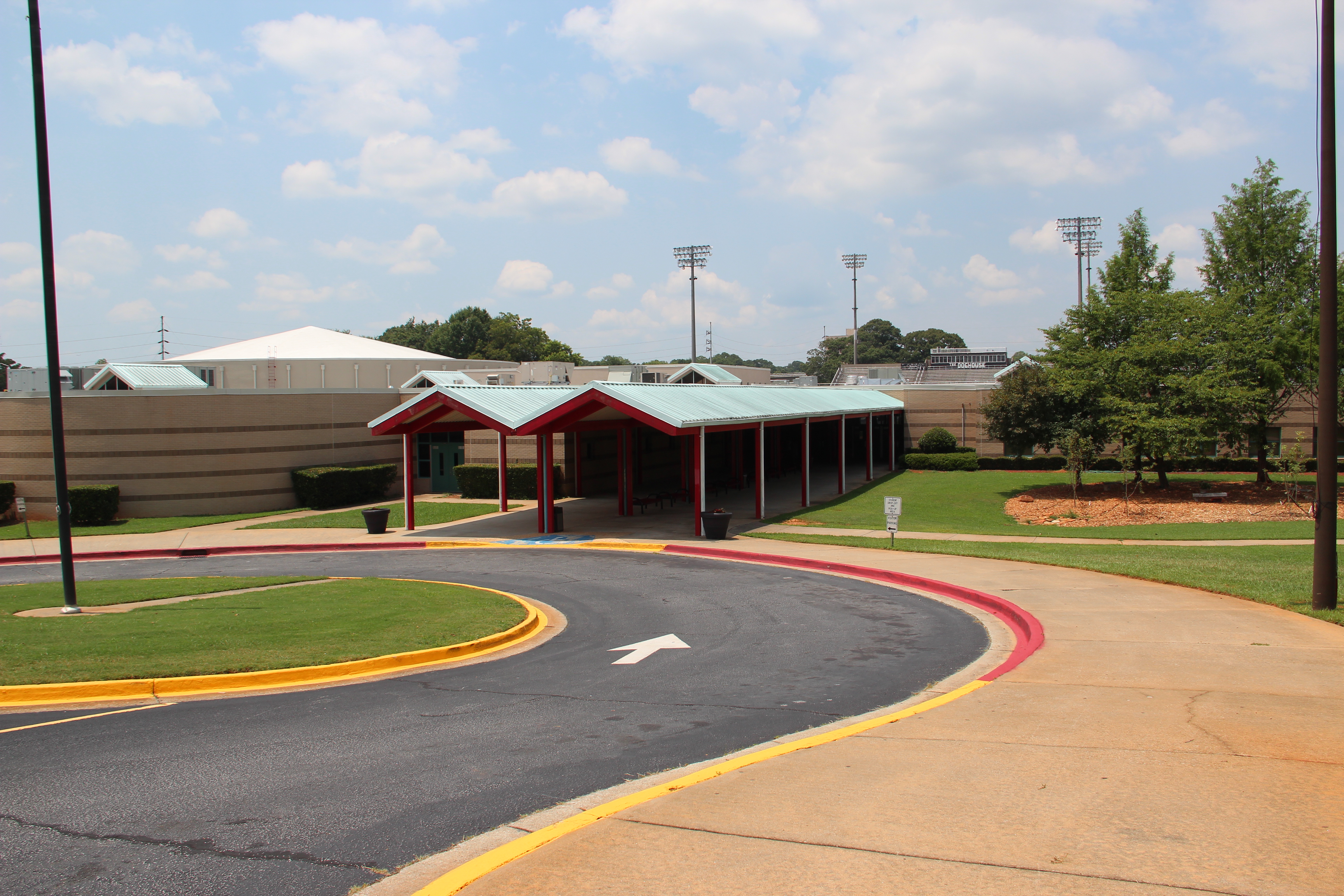
Tri-Cities High School

=== Primary and secondary schools ===
Fulton County School System operates East Point's public schools. Schools located in East Point include:

- Asa G. Hilliard Elementary School
- Brookview Elementary School
- Conley Hills Elementary School
- Hamilton E. Holmes Elementary School
- KIPP South Fulton Academy
- Parklane Elementary School (closed in 2025)
- Paul D. West Middle School
- Woodland Middle School
- Tri-Cities High School

Russell High School is a former high school in East Point.

== Media ==
Part of the Fear Street horror film series were shot in East Point in 2019.

== Infrastructure ==
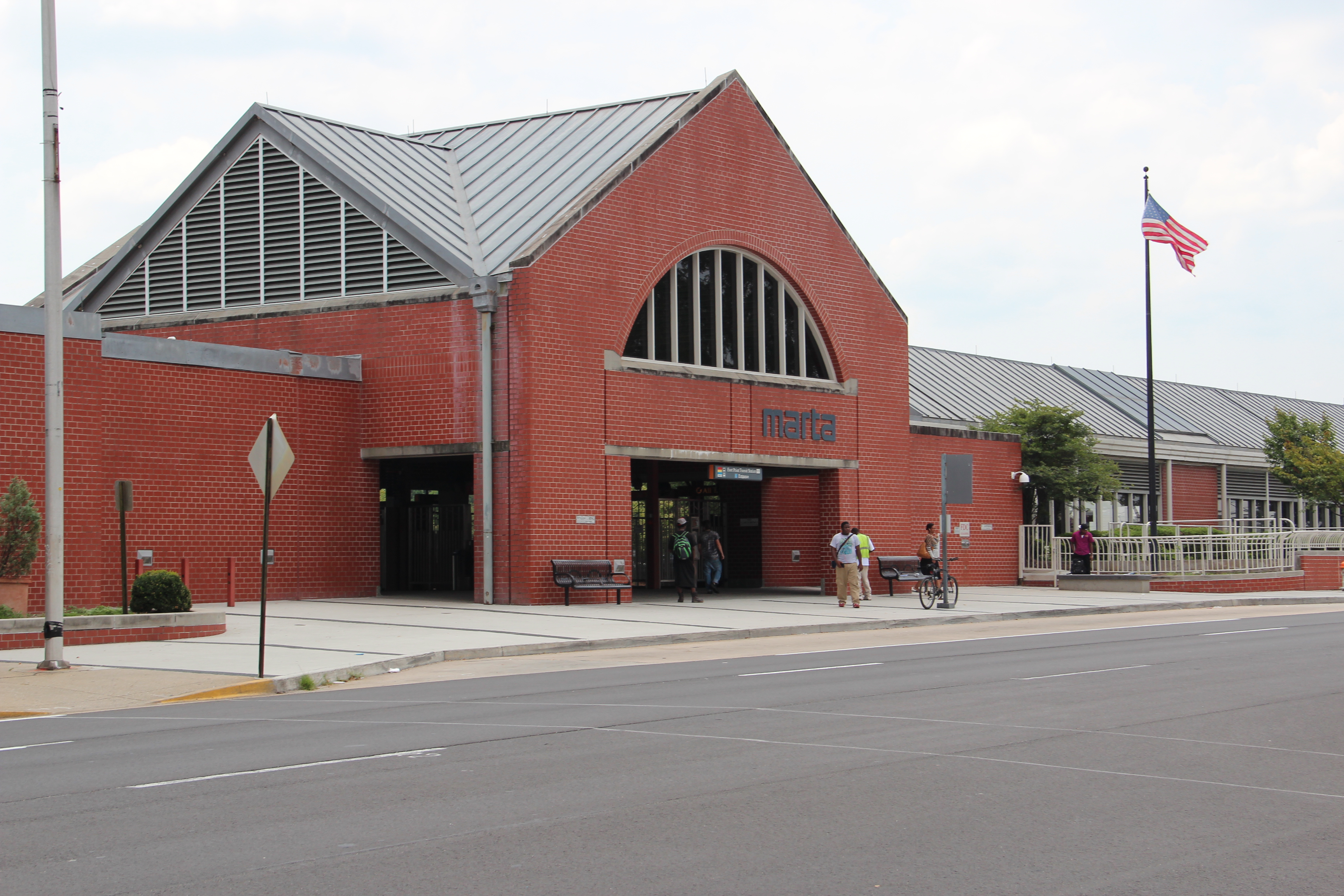
MARTA in Downtown East Point

The MARTA subway's Red Line and Gold Line stop at East Point station, and various bus lines serve the city.

== Notable people ==
- Dale Boone, competitive eater.
- Gino Groover, professional baseball player.
- John Milner, professional baseball player.
- Hines Ward, professional football player and coach.

== See also ==
- List of U.S. communities with African-American majority populations in 2020
