= Defense Homes Corporation =

The Defense Homes Corporation was created on October 23, 1940 to finance housing for war industry workers, and existed through 1942.

== History ==
The Defense Homes Corporation was incorporated pursuant to a letter of President Franklin D. Roosevelt to the Secretary of the Treasury on October 18, 1940, to finance housing for war industries. Subdivisions and apartment complexes were constructed around the country where new war factories had caused a shortage of worker housing.

It was also known as "The Lanham Act" after Representative Fritz G. Lanham of Texas who championed the bill. To insure conservative support, the DHC was only to construct homes where the private homebuilding industry was not functioning. By January 1942, 207 projects had been completed and another 171 were authorized for construction.

On February 24, 1942, the Defense Homes Corporation was transferred to the Federal Housing Administration. In 1945, all assets were liquidated, with any remaining assets transferred to the Reconstruction Finance Corporation on June 30, 1948.

== Examples of DHC projects ==
- Colonial Hills, Ohio
- Fairlington, Virginia
