= WIP-FM =

Sports radio station in Philadelphia

- Philadelphia, Pennsylvania; United States
- Broadcast area: Philadelphia metropolitan area
- Frequency: 94.1 MHz (HD Radio)
- Branding: SportsRadio 94WIP

Programming
- Language: English
- Format: Sports radio
- Subchannels: HD2: All-news radio (KYW); HD3: Classic rock ("WYSP")
- Affiliations: Westwood One Sports; Philadelphia Eagles Radio Network; Philadelphia Phillies Radio Network; NFL on Westwood One Sports (national events only)

Ownership
- Owner: Audacy, Inc.; (Audacy License, LLC)
- Sister stations: KYW; WBEB; WOGL; WPHI-FM; WPHT; WTDY-FM

History
- First air date: 1948
- Former call signs: WIBG-FM (1948–69); WPNA (1969–71); WYSP (1971–2011)
- Call sign meaning: Taken from former sister station/simulcast WIP (610 AM), which was randomly assigned

Technical information
- Licensing authority: FCC
- Facility ID: 28628
- Class: B
- ERP: 9,600 watts (analog); 460 watts (digital)
- HAAT: 339 meters (1,112 ft)
- Transmitter coordinates: 40°02′30″N 75°14′10.1″W

Links
- Public license information: Public file; LMS
- Webcast: Listen live (via Audacy)
- Website: www.audacy.com/94wip

WIP-FM (94.1 MHz, "SportsRadio 94WIP") is a commercial radio station licensed to serve Philadelphia, Pennsylvania. The station is owned by Audacy, Inc. and broadcasts a sports radio format. The WIP-FM offices and studios are co-located in Audacy's corporate headquarters in Center City, Philadelphia, and the broadcast tower used by the station is located in the Roxborough section of Philadelphia.

WIP-FM is the flagship station for the Philadelphia Eagles of the National Football League and the Philadelphia Phillies of Major League Baseball.

WIP-FM broadcasts using HD Radio. Its HD2 subchannel is a simulcast of co-owned 1060 KYW's all-news format. The HD3 channel carries a classic rock format that had been once heard on 94.1 when it was WYSP. The HD4 channel was known as "Eagles 24/7", with continuous programming about the football team.

== History ==
=== Beginning as WIBG-FM ===
In 1948, the station signed on as WIBG-FM. It was the sister station of WIBG, and mostly simulcast the AM station, including the 1960s when WIBG was one of Philadelphia's leading Top 40 stations. However, it was hard to hear the FM station outside of Philadelphia and its close suburbs, because it was only powered at 10,000 watts on a 180-foot tower, well below the standard for other Philadelphia FM stations. In the mid-1960s, WIBG-FM began to experiment at night with a prerecorded progressive rock format without announcers.

In 1968, owner Storer Broadcasting shut the station down while attempting to get Federal Communications Commission (FCC) permission for an increase in power. WIBG-FM was a restricted Class B station at the time. It was limited in range to avoid interfering with WKOK-FM in Sunbury, Pennsylvania, also on 94.1 MHz, 106 miles away (see Signal Note below). In 1969, WIBG-FM's call sign was changed to WPNA when Storer sold WIBG (AM) but kept the FM station. The station remained silent for two years.

=== Sold to SJR Communications ===
Having been unsuccessful in getting the Sunbury station to agree to an FCC waiver, Storer sold WPNA, along with WCJW in Cleveland, Ohio, to SJR Communications for a combined $1.4 million. (SJR stood for "San Juan Racing," referring to the company's lone U.S. holding: a horse racing track in San Juan, Puerto Rico.) SJR changed the call sign to WYSP ("Your Station in Philadelphia"), and quickly made a deal with the Sunbury station that allowed WYSP to increase its power. The station became a full Class B. The effective radiated power (ERP) was boosted to 39,000 watts and the tower was increased to 550 feet in height above average terrain (HAAT).

On August 23, 1971, WYSP went on the air. The format consisted of live announcers playing big band and easy listening music from half-hour-long reel-to-reel tapes that were produced in-house. The WYSP studios were located in the Suburban Station Building at 16th and JFK Parkway in Philadelphia. A new RCA transmitter and circular polarized five-bay Gates antenna were installed at the transmitter site.

=== Album rock format ===
At 6 a.m. on August 6, 1973, the easy listening and big band music abruptly stopped, and WYSP began playing album-oriented rock (AOR). The entire announcing staff was fired (despite attempts to unionize), and five new announcers were hired, including Tom Straw and Dean Clark. The music included popular cuts from top-selling rock albums by artists such as Jimi Hendrix, Chicago, and Crosby Stills and Nash. Radio consultant Kent Burkhart was signed up. He hired Dick Findley from WEBN in Cincinnati to be the Program Director, music director, handle the promotions, and host middays. With promotional help from artists like Aerosmith, Jimmy Buffett, and Charlie Daniels, the station took off. After a series of concerts in the park, high school hops and public involvement, the station beat rock competitor WMMR by more than 2 to 1 in the ratings. It was at that point in 1975-1976 that the station peaked. New consultant Ken Abrams began "The Fox & Leonard Morning Show" (Sonny Fox & Bob Leonard), the first two-man morning show on AOR radio.

In 1974, WYSP became Philadelphia's "quad" station, piping its audio through a Sony Quadrophonic encoder, which provided "ambience" effects to the rear channels of the handful of quad radios in the market. Due to a compatibility problem with regular mono radios, and a lack of interest from the listening public, the quad encoder was quietly dismantled in 1976.

In 1977, the station moved its transmitter to its current location at the Philadelphia master antenna farm in Roxborough.

In June 1979, Program Director Steve Sutton was hired to put a failing WYSP back on track. Assembling a line-up of Jerry Abear, Sean McKay and Bill Fantini (6-10a), Denny Somach (10a-2p), Randy Kotz (2-6p), Gary Bridges (6-10p), Cyndy Drue (10p-2a) and Trip Reeb (2-6a), the station broke artists like Tom Petty in Philadelphia. Sutton hired popular Eagles linebacker Frank LeMaster for mornings during football season. The station was loud, uptempo and cutting edge. Production, including outrageous spots and promos, came from Jay Gilbert and later, R.D. Steele, making WYSP unique. The station was hugely creative, generating syndicated shows picked up by other album rock stations around the country.

In 1981, WYSP was acquired by the Infinity Broadcasting Corporation. Infinity had been buying FM rock stations in large cities. It already owned WKTU in New York City, WBCN in Boston and KOME in San Jose.

=== Classic rock format ===
In the fall of 1981, WYSP became one of the first radio stations to switch to "classic rock." Account Executive Jim Sacony gave general manager Frank X. Feller a reel-to-reel tape with a sample of what the classic rock format would sound like. The featured artists on the reel to reel were The Yardbirds, The Zombies, The Young Rascals, Van Morrison, The Rolling Stones, The Beatles, Steppenwolf and The Byrds.

Feller liked what he heard and directed Program Director and Midday DJ Dick Hungate to team up with station consultant Lee Abrams to come up with a plan. They wanted to better compete with the two more-established rock stations, 93.3 WMMR and 102.1 WIOQ. The actual on-air description, "Classic Rock," was thought of in a strategy session, in which other adjectives such as "timeless" and "vintage" also were discussed by Hungate and Abrams. Hungate created a playlist of older rock tracks based upon his previous Philly experience as music director of WMMR in 1978–79. For the on-air playlist, Hungate used metal file boxes and color-coded 3" X 5" index cards to manually rotate titles depending on each song's popularity.

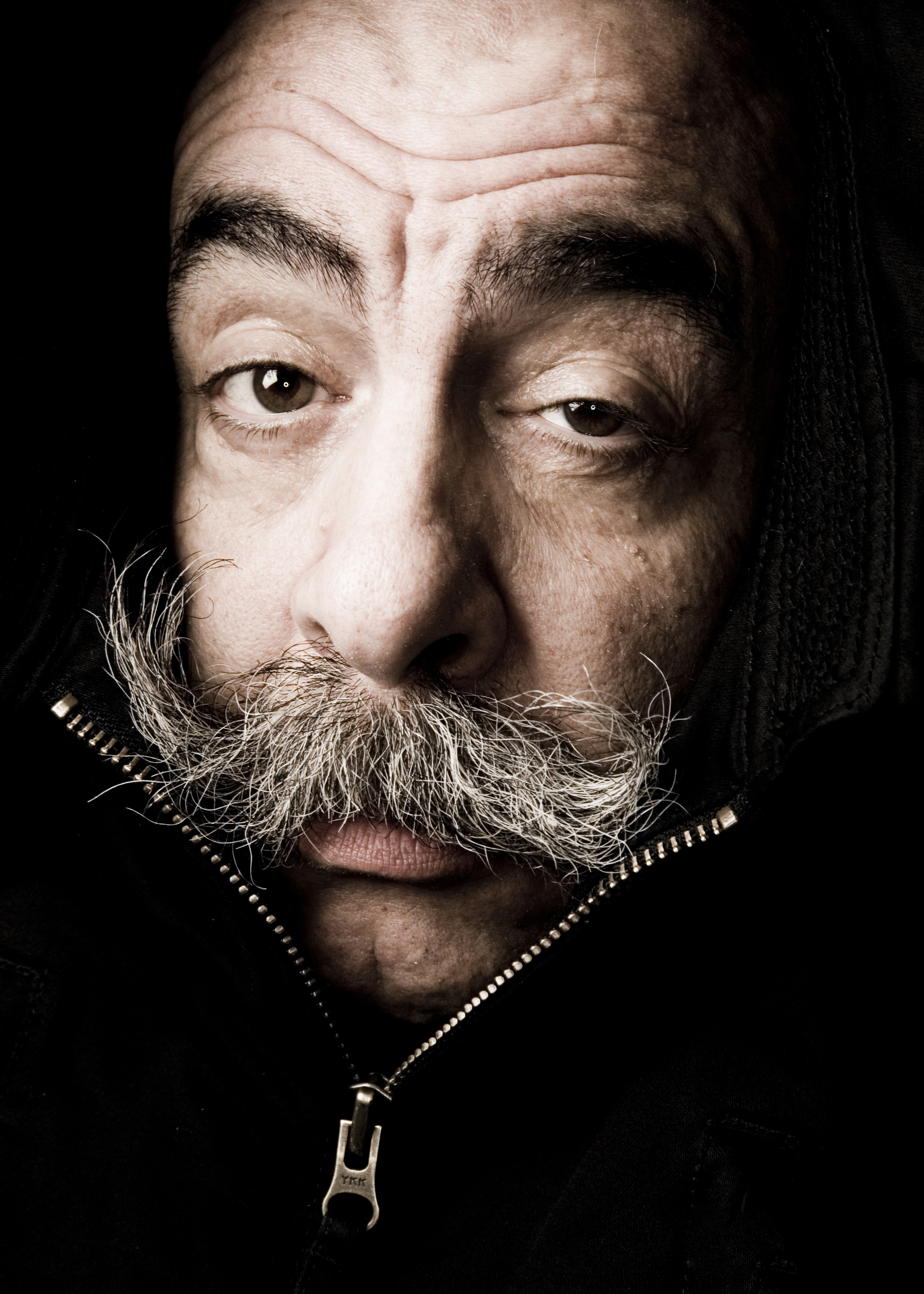
John DeBella in 2005

=== Hard rock format ===
In 1995, WYSP abandoned classic rock for a contemporary hard rock format during a period when former WMMR morning host John DeBella joined the station. DeBella took over the afternoon drive slot and, within one year, helped the station achieve a number-one rating in its core demographic. WYSP returned to classic rock again a few years later.

=== Purchase by CBS Radio ===
In 1996, Infinity Broadcasting merged with CBS Radio. CBS already owned rival rock station WMMR, and the Infinity merger left CBS one station over the FCC's ownership limit at that time. WMMR was sold to Greater Media. This left empty space at the KYW-AM-TV studios on Independence Mall, which served as the headquarters for CBS' broadcasting operations in Philadelphia. On April 5, 1997, WMMR and WYSP switched studios, with WYSP moving to 5th and Market Street near Independence Mall in Downtown Philadelphia and WMMR moving to Bala Cynwyd.

=== Talk shows added to rock format ===
Over its years as a rock station, WYSP sometimes added talk-intensive or talk-based shows during the daytime hours. In 1986, WYSP was the first affiliate when The Howard Stern Show began syndicating from its New York City home base. Stern was often the top show in the ratings when he was heard in mornings from 6-10 a.m. on WYSP. (Stern left for Sirius Satellite Radio in 2005.)

Over time, other syndicated shows made WYSP their Philadelphia home, including Opie and Anthony and Don and Mike. While some shows proved successful in their time slot, the station did not retain many of them, usually replacing them with the music format.

=== Free FM ===
On October 25, 2005, CBS Radio switched WYSP and several other Stern affiliates to the "Free FM" format. From its inception until early 2007, WYSP featured hot talk on weekdays from 6 a.m. to 7 pm. A mix of talk and music was heard from 7 to 10 pm. WYSP aired all music after 10 p.m. and around the clock on weekends.

For many years, WYSP simulcast Philadelphia Eagles NFL games, while co-owned WIP was the primary flagship station. From April 2006 to October 2007, the station carried Opie and Anthony's syndicated talk show in the morning, after David Lee Roth's syndicated Free FM morning show failed to garner good ratings.

At 11:59 p.m. on March 16, 2007, WYSP D.J. Jacky Bam Bam (now with WMMR) signed off at the station's studios at 5th and Market Streets, also shared with KYW, KYW-TV, and WPSG, before switching over to the new studios one block away, located on the 9th floor at 4th and Market. (KYW (AM) is also located in the same building, but on the 10th floor.) The first all-talk broadcast from the new studios, the 9 a.m. Barsky Show, was broadcast on March 19, 2007, with minor, but correctable problems.

On November 20, 2006, WYSP added the Scotty and Alex Show to replace Couzin Ed. While they continued to play music, their show was part of the mostly-talk Free-FM format. On April 17, Scotty and Alex stopped playing music. WYSP also began to carry the syndicated Loveline and John and Jeff shows, effectively ending weekday music programming.

=== Philadelphia's FM Talk Station ===
During the week of June 18, 2007, WYSP stopped calling its talk format "Free FM." New imaging was slowly rolled out which referred to the station as either "94-1 WYSP" or "94 WYSP." During the week of June 25, a new "94 WYSP Talks" logo was unveiled on the station website, wiping clean any reference to "Free FM" from the station's identity. On August 13, during the first "Eagles Radio" broadcast of the year, new imaging began to refer to the station as "Philadelphia's FM Talk Station." A similar nickname also began to be used by corporate sister station KLSX in Los Angeles.

In June 2007, long time music programmer Gil Edwards was let go, further evidence that WYSP was committed to talk programming. Edwards lobbied for a return to rock before leaving but was rebuffed by management.

On September 11, 2007, an article was published in the Philadelphia Daily News reporting a format change at WYSP was imminent. Paul Barsky brushed the article off as rumor, as did Matt of the Matt and Huggy Show and Kidd Chris. Scotty and Alex referred to their show that night as their "last" show, claiming that not many radio shows get to do a final broadcast. They hoped to return the next day, but it turned out that night's show really was their last.

On September 12, 2007, Paul Barsky stated that he had re-signed with the station, and his show continued as normal with guest Donovan McNabb of the Philadelphia Eagles. Promos for the station would later be heard featuring McNabb announcing that "The Rock Is Back," which had been recorded the day of his appearance. At the start of Kidd Chris' broadcast, he discussed the topic of the format change, revealing that Scotty, Alex, Matt and Huggy had been fired, the Barsky Show was no more, and that Chris himself had lost members of his show (later revealed to be co-producer "Monkeyboy" Dave Eitel and producer Brad Maybe).

=== Return to rock ===
The following day, Opie and Anthony broadcast their show from the WYSP studios. They joked about the lack of secrecy about the format change. Articles about the switch appeared in that day's Philadelphia Daily News and The Philadelphia Inquirer. Opie joked about the "94 WYSP, The Rock Station" sweatshirt Anthony was wearing and the tearing down of a "94 WYSP Talks" poster in the studio.

At 5 pm, WYSP switched back to an active rock format, without the alternative lean previously heard during WYSP's last months as a music station. Only Opie and Anthony in the morning drive slot and Kidd Chris as the afternoon host remained. The first three songs on the return of WYSP's rock format were Welcome to the Jungle by Guns N' Roses, Back in Black by AC/DC, and Smells Like Teen Spirit by Nirvana.

On October 23, 2007, WYSP ceased airing the syndicated Opie and Anthony Show, replacing them with music. October 23, 2007, was also the last day Kidd Chris's show aired in the 3-7 PM slot. He ended his show with "Don't Stop Believin'" by Journey, and music took over his time slot the next day. For nearly a month, he was in talks with the station for a new contract, and was expected to return in the morning slot. On November 25, WYSP's website announced that Kidd Chris would be returning the following day, with his show airing from 6-10 a.m., Opie and Anthony's old time slot.

Kidd Chris remained the morning host for seven months until May 16, 2008, when CBS terminated Chris and WYSP program director John Cook due to an offensive song called "Schwoogies" which first aired on March 21 and several times there after. The song referred to African-Americans in slang terms that station management determined to be highly offensive.

On August 25, 2008, WYSP returned to the classic rock format it shed in 1995, using the slogan "The Rock You Grew Up With from the 70s, 80s, & 90s." WYSP's version of classic rock had a harder direction than that of the market's other classic rock station, WMGK, WMMR's sister station.

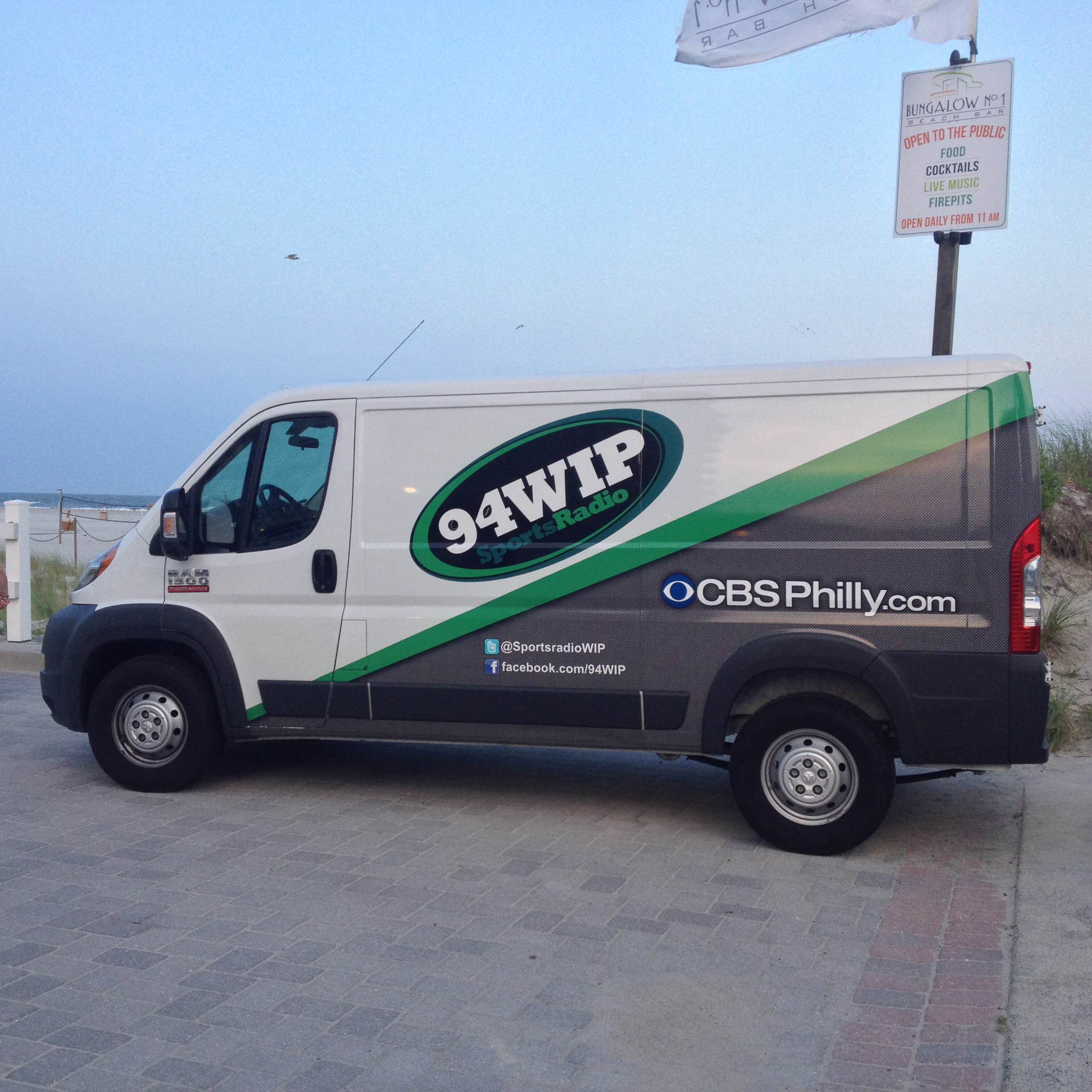
A WIP van at an event at Diamond Beach, New Jersey.

Former "Partridge Family" TV star Danny Bonaduce was named the new morning drive host for WYSP, with his program beginning on November 10, 2008.

=== Sports talk format ===
WYSP's sister station, WIP, had been airing a popular all-sports format since 1988; by 2009, it had to compete with an FM sports rival, WPEN-FM. Speculation had grown that CBS would want an FM counterpart to capitalize on WIP's popularity.

On August 18, 2011, CBS Radio announced that WIP would begin simulcasting its sports format on 94.1 FM, starting on September 6, thus ending music on 94.1. The change actually took place on September 2, four days earlier than announced. On its final day, Howard Stern called into the station to discuss his time on WYSP with host Spike Eskin. At 3:00 p.m. that day, WYSP ended its music format with "Fade to Black" by Metallica as its final song. The WYSP classic rock programming was then moved to its HD-3 subchannel. The station switched its call sign to WIP-FM.

Shortly after WIP-FM began its simulcast with WIP (AM), the two stations began to sometimes split, with certain sporting events not heard on both frequencies. Most Philadelphia Phillies broadcasts, heard on WIP-FM in 2012, were also carried on the AM dial by co-owned WPHT, while WIP (AM) aired other sports programming. The syndicated Nick & Artie Show was added to 610 AM's programming in February 2012, while local programming continuing on WIP-FM. The simulcast ended entirely January 2, 2013, when WIP became a full-time affiliate of CBS Sports Radio, with local sports programming continuing to air on WIP-FM.

=== CBS station trades and Entercom/Audacy ownership ===
On October 2, 2014, CBS Radio announced that it would trade 14 radio stations located in Tampa, Charlotte and WIP (AM), to the Beasley Broadcast Group in exchange for three stations in Miami and two FM stations in Philadelphia, WXTU and WRDW-FM. WIP-FM was not affected by this transaction, remaining with CBS.

On February 2, 2017, CBS Radio announced it would merge with Entercom. The merger was approved on November 9, 2017, and was consummated on November 17. In 2021, Entercom rebranded to Audacy, Inc.

== Notable on-air staff ==
=== Current on-air staff ===
- Larry Andersen
- Joe DeCamara
- Hugh Douglas
- Spike Eskin
- Scott Franzke
- Jack Fritz
- Sonny Hill
- Jody McDonald
- Al Morganti
- Mike Quick
- Ike Reese
- Merrill Reese
- Rickie Ricardo
- Jon Ritchie
- Eliot Shorr-Parks

=== Former staff ===
- Michael Barkann
- Tom Brookshier
- Tony Bruno
- Craig Carton
- Angelo Cataldi
- Garry Cobb
- Pat Croce
- Ray Didinger
- Howard Eskin
- Big Daddy Graham
- Jim Jackson
- Keith Jones
- Devan Kaney
- John Kincade
- Glen Macnow
- John Marzano
- Mike Missanelli
- Hollis Thomas

== See also ==
- List of three-letter broadcast call signs in the United States
