= Tony Bruno =

American sports announcer

- Bruno and Robin Austin at an event for the National Italian American Foundation in 2010
- Born: Anthony Joseph Bruno; June 13, 1952 (age 74); Philadelphia, Pennsylvania, U.S.
- Education: Temple University
- Occupations: Sports radio host, radio/TV personality
- Years active: 1970–present
- Partner: Robin Austin
- Children: 3
- Website: www.tonybrunoshow.com

Anthony Joseph Bruno (born June 13, 1952) is an American sports talk radio host. He has worked for national American sports broadcasters including ESPN Radio, Fox Sports Radio, Premiere, and Sporting News Radio.

== Early life ==
His father served in both the American and Italian Army where his met Bruno's mother, a Sicilian Native. He has one older sister and one younger sister. He graduated from St. John Neumann High School, then from Temple University.

== Radio career ==
=== WCAU, KFI, and WIP ===
Bruno's first talk show was on WCAU in Philadelphia as the morning host. When WCAU abandoned talk in 1991, Bruno moved to Sports Talk as a co-host of WIP's Morning Guys show with Angelo Cataldi and Al Morganti. He later joined ESPN's new radio network in 1992 as one of the first hosts. He remained at the network until 2000. In 1996, he stated on air he would walk from Bristol, CT to Syracuse, NY if the Orangemen beat Kansas in that year’s NCAA Basketball Tournament—which they did, by a score of 60–56. He was ready to make that walk, but his bosses at ESPN refused to let him.

=== Fox Sports Radio ===
In 2000, Bruno moved to Los Angeles, launching the Fox Sports Radio network. Bruno hosted The Tony Bruno Extravaganza morning program with Andrew Siciliano. During this time, Bruno was frequently a guest host on Fox Sports Network's The Best Damn Sports Show Period. Prior to heading west to California, Bruno hosted a morning show on 620 WDAE in Tampa.

=== Sporting News Radio and KNBR ===
In 2006, he signed with Sporting News Radio. The Tony Bruno Show appeared on Sporting News Radio and on XM Satellite Radio weekdays. He hosted there from 2006 to 2008, in the same morning show time slot. He was carried on XM Sports Nation for most of the show's run on Sporting News. Bruno also did a daily half-hour with Gary Radnich on the Gary Radnich Show on KNBR in San Francisco.

In January 2008, it was announced that Bruno's show on Sporting News Radio had been cancelled, though KNBR hoped to have him continue working with Radnich. He did return to working with Radnich, until August 1, 2011, when Radnich announced KNBR management has decided to drop the half-hour segment with Bruno after 16 years.

=== New show and return to Fox Sports Radio ===
On September 29, 2008, Bruno got a new show called Into The Night with Tony Bruno, which featured his Executive Producer Tim Cates and introduced Robin Austin. It first aired live on the West Coast from 7 to 10pm on am 570 KLAC, the top ranked Sports station in Los Angeles. After one month exclusively on KLAC, it was syndicated around the country on November 3. Bruno aired the show from various major sporting events.

On July 30, 2009, Premiere Radio Networks announced it had partnered with The Content Factory to distribute Bruno's show across the Fox Sports Radio network beginning August 10. Bruno's contract was not renewed, and he left in September 2011.

=== Return to Philadelphia ===
On January 18, 2010, Bruno, paired with Harry Mayes, and returned to a daily show from noon to 2 PM on ESPN until June 26, 2014.

On October 13, 2014, Bruno debuted the Tony Bruno Show podcast.

On January 30, 2015, he announced his return to WIP in Philadelphia.

Bruno retired from radio in July 2015 but still continues his live podcast every Wednesday night.

=== Sirius XM and SportsMap ===
The Tony Bruno Show with Harry Mayes returned to SiriusXM on April 6, 2020, and aired every weekday from 3pm to 6pm EST, on the Dan Patrick Radio channel 211, alongside co-host Harry Mayes. Bruno's program was also among the offerings of the SportsMap Radio Network (the former Sporting News Radio, Yahoo! Sports Radio and SB Nation Radio), after it ended its cross-branding agreements and brought all programming back in-house in July 2020. The show was cancelled by both Sirius XM and SportsMap in late-August 2020 after Bruno made fun of LeBron reading only the 1st page of any book he was pictured with on air & a journalist at Deadspin wrote an article claiming that Bruno disparaged National Basketball Association (NBA) players as illiterate.

== Other work ==
=== Madden NFL ===
Bruno is the host of EA Sports Radio, a show that has appeared on the 2005, 2006, and 2007 versions of the Madden NFL video game. The show has Bruno listing statistics and accomplishments from the previous "week" of play. In addition, he "interviews" players and coaches, takes calls from listeners, and even asks trivia questions.

== Personal life ==
Bruno is divorced with three grown children. He lived in Venice, California, for 11 years, then moved back to Philadelphia, Pennsylvania, in September 2011. He recently moved to Cape Coral, FL and lives with his longtime girlfriend, now fiance and producer/manager Robin Austin.
