= Jody McDonald =

American sports radio personality (born 1962)

- Born: 1962 (age 63–64); Yonkers, New York, U.S.
- Presenting career
- Show: The Jody McDonald Show (1990–1993); Mac & Mac (1994–1999); The Midday Show (2000–2004)
- Station: WIP-AM
- Time slot: 1 P.M. - 4 P.M., Monday–Friday; 10 A.M. - 3 P.M., Monday–Friday
- Station: WFAN
- Time slot: 10 A.M. - 1 P.M., Monday–Friday
- Style: Sports radio
- Country: United States

Jody McDonald (born 1962), nicknamed Jody Mac, is an American sports talk show host on 610 WTEL/94.1 WIP-FM weekdays 11pm to 2am and weekend host on WFAN 660 AM NY. He is the son of former Major League Baseball executive Joe McDonald.

== Career ==
A Yonkers native, McDonald began his career with WFAN in 1987, when it launched. He would join WIP, a Philadelphia sports radio station in 1990, where he hosted a show called Mac and Mac with Glen Macnow. He returned to WFAN in 1999, hosting the midday show from May 2000 through November 2004, initially with Suzyn Waldman and later with Sid Rosenberg. McDonald was also the host of the Philadelphia Eagles pre-game show on the Eagles radio network (WYSP) from 2001-2004.

He next worked afternoon drive, joining Sports Talk 950, (later to become 950 ESPN radio). His tenure there lasted from 2005 to September, 4th 2009. He also spent a few years on nationally aired, Sirius XM's NBA and MLB talk channels.

Sometime in 2010 1050 ESPN Radio NY had a regular mid day show with Brandon Tierney & Jody McDonald that ran until April 2011. He stayed on, moving to weekends on ESPN Radio NY, while also hosting on Sirius 201 and XM 175 over the weekends. With schedule changes in 2012, McDonald left 1050 ESPN Radio. He would return to 94.1 WIP in the summer of 2011 filling in weekday nights. September 22 he moved back to WFAN 660 AM/101.9 FM hosting the 10:00am–12:30pm shift. He currently hosts The Final Out following Phillies games and fills in various slots on WIP in Philadelphia.

McDonald also writes a weekly sports blog for Philly Sports Pulse called "Jody Mac's Sports Attack!"
