= Ike Reese =

American football player and sports radio host (born 1973)

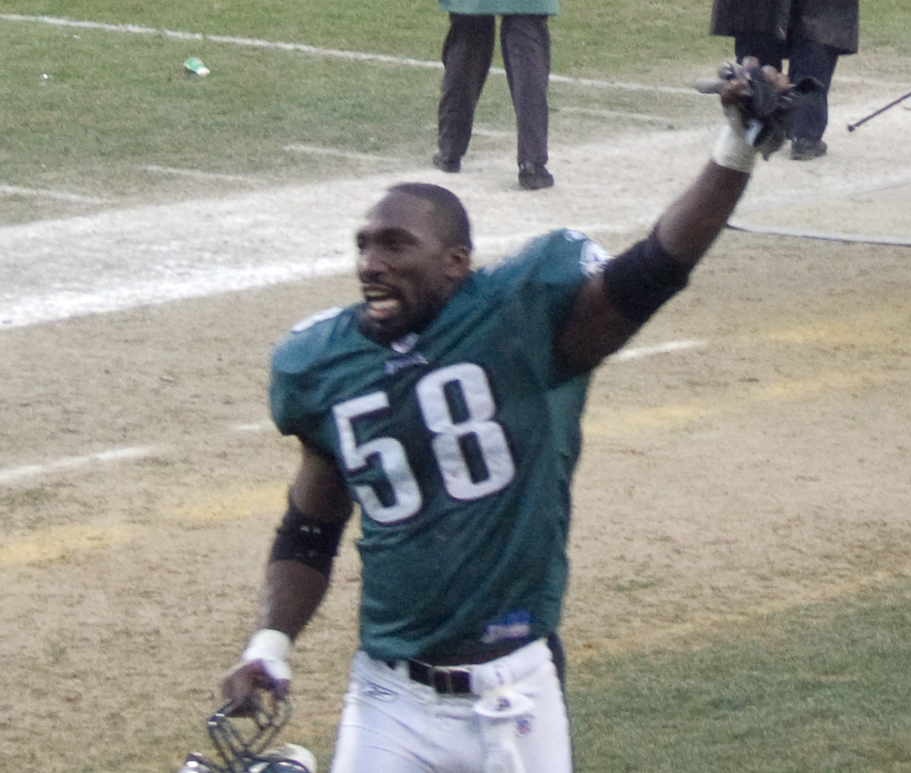
- Reese in 2005

No. 58, 98
- Position: Linebacker

Personal information
- Born: October 16, 1973 (age 53); Jacksonville, North Carolina, U.S.
- Listed height: 6 ft 2 in (1.88 m)
- Listed weight: 222 lb (101 kg)

Career information
- High school: Aiken (Cincinnati, Ohio)
- College: Michigan State
- NFL draft: 1998: 5th round, 142nd overall pick

Career history
- Philadelphia Eagles (1998–2004); Atlanta Falcons (2005–2006)

Awards and highlights
- Pro Bowl (2004); Third-team All-American (1997); First-team All-Big Ten (1997)

Career NFL statistics
- Total tackles: 280
- Sacks: 6.5
- Forced fumbles: 7
- Fumble recoveries: 1
- Interceptions: 2
- Stats at Pro Football Reference

Isaiah "Ike" Reese (born October 16, 1973) is an American sports radio personality and former professional football linebacker. He played in the National Football League (NFL) for nine seasons, primarily for the Philadelphia Eagles.

Reese played college football for the Michigan State Spartans and was selected by the Eagles in the fifth round of the 1998 NFL draft. He spent seven seasons with the Eagles and was a member of their 2004 NFC championship team, where he was selected to the Pro Bowl that same season as a special teamer. In 2005, Reese signed with the Atlanta Falcons, where he spent two seasons before retiring in 2007.

In 2008, Reese began a career in radio with the Philadelphia sports station WIP. He currently serves as a co-host on the WIP Afternoon Show.

== Early life and college career ==
Born in Jacksonville, North Carolina, Reese was raised in Cincinnati and attended Woodward High School as a freshman before transferring to nearby Aiken High School. Reese graduated from Aiken in 1993 and committed to Michigan State. After redshirting his freshman year, Reese played three seasons as a starter under head coaches George Perles and Nick Saban. He finished his college career with 420 tackles, 10 sacks, 3 interceptions, 4 forced fumbles, and 5 fumble recoveries.

== Professional career ==
Reese was drafted by the Philadelphia Eagles in fifth round of the 1998 NFL draft. He played for the Philadelphia Eagles from 1998 to 2004 and was selected to the 2005 Pro Bowl as a special teamer for the NFC. He recorded 198 tackles, 6.5 sacks, and two interceptions during his time with the Eagles.

Reese signed with the Atlanta Falcons before the 2005 season. He spent two years with the Falcons posting 44 tackles. On March 2, 2007, the Falcons released him.

== NFL career statistics ==
Legend
**Bold**	Career high

=== Regular season ===
Year	Team	Games		Tackles				Interceptions				Fumbles			
Year	Team	GP	GS	Comb	Solo	Ast	Sck	Int	Yds	TD	Lng	FF	FR	Yds	TD
1998	PHI	16	0	4	3	1	0.0	0	0	0	0	0	0	0	0
1999	PHI	16	0	28	22	6	**3.0**	0	0	0	0	2	0	0	0
2000	PHI	16	0	17	15	2	0.0	0	0	0	0	0	0	0	0
2001	PHI	16	0	28	21	7	0.0	0	0	0	0	**3**	0	0	0
2002	PHI	16	3	**54**	**45**	**9**	1.5	0	0	0	0	0	0	0	0
2003	PHI	16	1	39	37	2	1.0	0	0	0	0	1	**1**	0	0
2004	PHI	16	1	53	**45**	8	1.0	**2**	**22**	0	**15**	1	0	0	0
2005	ATL	16	0	40	33	7	0.0	0	0	0	0	0	0	0	0
2006	ATL	16	0	17	13	4	0.0	0	0	0	0	0	0	0	0
Career		144	5	280	234	46	6.5	2	22	0	15	7	1	0	0

=== Playoffs ===
Year	Team	Games		Tackles				Interceptions				Fumbles			
Year	Team	GP	GS	Comb	Solo	Ast	Sck	Int	Yds	TD	Lng	FF	FR	Yds	TD
2000	PHI	2	0	0	0	0	0.0	0	0	0	0	0	0	0	0
2002	PHI	2	0	6	6	0	0.0	0	0	0	0	**1**	0	0	0
2003	PHI	2	2	**7**	**7**	0	**1.0**	0	0	0	0	**1**	0	0	0
2004	PHI	3	0	5	3	**2**	0.0	**1**	**3**	0	**3**	0	0	0	0
Career		9	2	18	16	2	1.0	1	3	0	3	2	0	0	0

== Broadcasting career ==
In 2008, Reese began hosting Ike at Night evenings on 610 WIP in Philadelphia. Reese became Howard Eskin's co-host on the station's afternoon drive show, forming the Afternoons with Howard Eskin & Ike Reese Show in 2009. That same year, he became the Saturday night sports anchor for KYW-TV/WPSG.

In 2011, Ike was paired with Michael Barkann on the new 94.1 WIP to host the station's midday show, Mike and Ike. Beginning in November 2017, he was paired with Jon Marks to co-host the station's Marks & Reese show. Jack Fritz joined the show in July 2019. Following Marks’ departure at the end of 2023, Ike was partnered with Fritz and Spike Eskin as co-hosts of the WIP Afternoon Show.

Reese appeared on NBC Sports Philadelphia's Eagles Pregame Live and Eagles Postgame Live for Eagles postseason games in 2025.
