= Big Daddy Graham =

American comedian (1953–2021)

- Born: Edward Gudonis; May 29, 1953; Philadelphia, Pennsylvania, U.S.
- Died: September 8, 2021 (aged 68); Mullica Hill, New Jersey, U.S.
- Occupations: Radio host; comedian; actor; writer
- Employer: WIP
- Spouse: Debbie
- Children: 2

Edward Gudonis (May 29, 1953 – September 8, 2021), known professionally as Big Daddy Graham, was an American comedian, writer, actor, recording artist, and sports radio personality. He hosted a show on 94 WIP-FM in Philadelphia from 1997 to 2019.

== Early life ==
Graham was born in Southwest Philadelphia on May 29, 1953. He was of Lithuanian and Irish descent. He attended West Catholic Preparatory High School, and was nicknamed "Big Daddy" by his friends when he was twelve years old.

== Career ==
=== Standup comic ===
Big Daddy Graham performed comedy for over 35 years at clubs, colleges, corporate and private parties, as well as banquets and fundraisers. His show, Two Funny Philly Guys, with fellow comedian Joe Conklin, was performed in theaters such as the 1,000-seat Borgata Music Box in Atlantic City, New Jersey and the Broadway Theater in Pitman, New Jersey. He also appeared on Showtime, MTV, and A&E, and was voted Philadelphia's funniest comedian by Philly Magazine and other publications a total of 15 times.

Graham recounted how he opened for fifteen members of the Rock and Roll Hall of Fame. These included Ray Charles, Smokey Robinson, B.B. King, and Gladys Knight.

=== Radio ===
Graham co-hosted 1210 AM's The Sports Attack with Scott Graham and Neil Hartman, where he interviewed sports personalities. He subsequently joined WIP in 1997 and served as a full-time host on sports talk radio station 94 WIP for over two decades.

Graham began recording a podcast, Big Daddy Graham's Classic Rock Throwdown, along with long time friend and bandmate, Spins Nitely on Wildfire Radio in 2014. As of August 2017, he recorded over 170 episodes, counting down songs as they relate to a particular topic each week.

=== Writer, playwright, and actor ===
Last Call (2003), the book Graham wrote about his father, sold over 30,000 copies in the Philadelphia area. He adapted Last Call into a one-man show, which he has performed to audiences at Society Hill Playhouse and the Media Theatre. He later co-authored The Great Book of Philadelphia Sports Lists with Glen Macnow in 2007. It went on to sell over 40,000 copies and a TV show was being planned at the time of his death.

Graham wrote the back page for South Jersey Magazine, 7 Mile Magazine, and the Sea Isle Times. He also wrote for City Paper and CSNPhilly.com.

Graham performed as Oscar in three productions of The Odd Couple, and was a member of TROUP, a federally funded group of twelve actors who performed up and down the east coast at prisons, homes of the elderly, playgrounds and libraries for over two years. Graham also appeared in a production of Androcles and the Lion as the lion.

=== Recording artist ===
In 1984, WMMR's ground-breaking Morning Zoo picked up Graham's satirical recording of his Catholic School upbringing, "Nuns!" His song "Let's Call In Sick" was heard on over 300 radio stations across the country and was still played on Monday mornings as of 2017. His songs sold over 100,000 copies between three albums and four CDs.

== Personal life ==
Graham was married to Debbie Garvey until his death. Together, they had two daughters: Keely and Ava. They resided in the Mullica Hill section of Harrison Township, New Jersey, in his later years. Ava followed in her father's footsteps and worked on the WIP Morning Show.

In July 2019, a ruptured blood vessel damaged his spinal cord and resulted in him being paralyzed from the waist down. He died on the evening of September 8, 2021, at his home. He was 68, and had heart failure that was further complicated by the effects of his spinal trauma.
