= Ron Burke =

Ron Burke may refer to:

- Ron Burke (sportscaster) (born 1963), American anchor/reporter and television personality
- Ronnie Burke (1921–2003), British footballer
