= Jack Fritz (radio personality) =

American sports radio personality (born 1994)

- Born: John Ross Fritz; March 15, 1994 (age 32); Media, Pennsylvania, U.S.
- Education: Bloomsburg University (BA)
- Presenting career
- Show: WIP Afternoon Show (2017–present)
- Station: WIP-FM
- Time slot: 2:00–6:00 p.m. ET; Monday–Friday
- Country: United States
- Baseball career

Bloomsburg Huskies – No. 29
- Pitcher
- Bats: Right Throws: Right

John Ross Fritz (born March 15, 1994), nicknamed "Jackie Baseball", is an American sports radio personality who is currently a co-host of the WIP Afternoon Show on 94.1 WIP. He is also the host of High Hopes, a podcast covering the Philadelphia Phillies. A graduate of Bloomsburg University, Fritz played as a pitcher on the school's baseball team.

== Early life and education ==
Fritz was born on March 15, 1994, in Media, Pennsylvania, and grew up in West Chester, Pennsylvania. He attended West Chester Rustin High School, where he played on the school's baseball and golf teams, and graduated in 2012.

In high school, Fritz was the #45 pitching prospect in Pennsylvania, and committed to Bloomsburg University. Fritz however struggled as a pitcher in college, and left the team after his sophomore season to pursue a career in sports radio, interning at WPEN. He graduated from Bloomsburg in 2016.

== Career ==
After graduating from Bloomsburg in 2016, Fritz initially drove for Uber and worked for his family's dog bone company. During these times, he listened to sports talk radio on a consistent basis and learned what type of segments worked best. Fritz began his tenure at WIP as a member of the "street team", assisting the station during their live events. Fritz then began producing for WIP's overnight shows and also served as a fill-in producer for the WIP Morning Show hosted by Angelo Cataldi. Six months later, in 2017, he was named the producer of the WIP Evening Show. In 2018, he became the producer of the WIP Afternoon Show with Jon Marks and Ike Reese.

In 2016, Fritz created High Hopes, a podcast about the Philadelphia Phillies. The podcast is named after the song "High Hopes" that legendary Phillies play-by-play announcer Harry Kalas would sing.

In March 2023, it was announced that Fritz would begin hosting his own show, Fritz at Six. The show runs from 6:00 to 7:00 PM and leads into WIP's coverage of Phillies games. Additionally, WIP announced that Fritz would host pregame and postgame coverage of Phillies games during the weekdays.

Fritz garnered attention in August 2023 when he encouraged Phillies fans to give Trea Turner a standing ovation, rather than boo him, in the team's first home stand back at Citizens Bank Park. This came during the midst of Turner's poor start to his first season with the team and a series against the Miami Marlins where he went 1-for-16 and made a key defensive mistake to cost the Phillies a game. In his first at-bat of the homestand, Phillies fans greeted Turner with a standing ovation and Turner hit an RBI single in the game. The next day, Turner was greeted with another standing ovation and, with the Phillies trailing the Kansas City Royals by a score of 6–5 in the bottom of the sixth inning, Turner hit a three-run, go-ahead home run. The Phillies won the game by a score of 9–6. For the remainder of the season following the ovation, Turner hit .337 with 16 home runs, a significant contrast from batting .235 with just 10 home runs before the ovation. After the Phillies clinched a playoff berth in September, Turner called the WIP Afternoon Show and thanked Fritz and the fans, saying: "Obviously, the whole thing happened and the rest is kind of history. [I] started playing a lot better and it was thanks to you guys and the crowd."

After Jon Marks left WIP in December 2023, it was announced in January 2024 that Fritz would become a co-host of the WIP Afternoon Show alongside Ike Reese and Spike Eskin. On the WIP Afternoon Show, Fritz is most known for his daily segment at 5:00 p.m. known as the "Top 5 at 5", where Fritz creates a Top 5 list based on a subject relating to Philadelphia sports or WIP. Co-host Spike Eskin frequently refers to the segment as "everyone's favorite part of the WIP Afternoon Show".

Fritz has also served as an occasional producer for the Phillies Radio Network.

== Personal life ==
Fritz married his wife, Jill Tatios, in August 2018. The couple has three children and live in West Chester, Pennsylvania.

Fritz's father owns Four Fingers Brewing Company in Aston, Pennsylvania.

== Bibliography ==
- Ring the Bell: How the Philadelphia Phillies Built Baseball's Best Fan Base with Kevin Reavy (2025). Sports Publishing ISBN 1-683-58497-X
