= John Kincade =

American sports radio personality

- Born: 1964 (age 61–62)
- Education: Temple University (BA)
- Occupation: Radio host
- Known for: Host of Kincade and Salciunas on 97.5 The Fanatic

John Kincade is an American sports radio personality for 97.5 The Fanatic in Philadelphia. He currently serves as a host on Kincade and Salciunas, the morning drive show for the station. Kincade previously worked at 610 WIP, 790 The Zone and 680 The Fan in Atlanta, and hosted a show on ESPN Radio and CBS Sports Radio.

== Early life and education ==
Kincade was raised in Broomall, Pennsylvania. He graduated from Cardinal O'Hara High School in 1982 and from Temple University in 1986 with a degree in radio/television and film. While at Temple, he worked as an intern for the Philadelphia Flyers.

== Career ==
Before entering sports radio, Kincade worked in sales and marketing for Shared Medical Systems (now Siemens) and coached local high school hockey. From 1992 to 1994, Kincade worked at 610 WIP as a contributor on the WIP Morning Show with Angelo Cataldi.

After moving to Atlanta in 1995, Kincade began working at 790 The Zone in 1999. In 2000, he began hosting the 680 The Fan's midday show (and later evening drive show) Buck and Kincade with former Georgia Bulldogs quarterback Buck Belue. He also worked in broadcasting roles for the Atlanta Thrashers.

In 2007, Kincade began hosting The John Kincade Show, a nationally-syndicated weekend show for ESPN Radio, while also serving as a fill-in host for Colin Cowherd's show The Herd with Colin Cowherd. In 2013, the show moved to CBS Sports Radio.

In 2015, Kincade began hosting The Big Podcast with NBA legend Shaquille O'Neal.

In 2020, Kincade was let go from 680 The Fan after 20 years with the station. In December of that year, 97.5 The Fanatic in Philadelphia announced they were hiring Kincade as the new host of the station's morning show along with Bob Cooney and Jamie Lynch. Kincade's new show debuted on January 4, 2021.

In 2024, Beasley Media Group announced restructuring of 97.5 The Fanatic's lineup, where Kincade would retain his role as host of the morning show, and now be paired with Andrew Salciunas and Connor Thomas. The new morning show, titled Kincade and Salciunas, debuted on March 18, 2024.

In June 2026, Beasley Media Group announced Kincade's departure from The Fanatic at the end of July to pursue the next chapter of his career.

== Personal life ==
Kincade is a three-time cancer survivor. During his time at 680 The Fan, he hosted the annual "Strike Out Leukemia & Lymphoma Radiothon" to raise money for the Leukemia & Lymphoma Society. The radiothon has since raised over $2 million since its inception in 2001. In 2006, the Leukemia & Lymphoma Society awarded Kincade with the Chairman's Citation Award for his fundraising efforts. He made it a goal to appear on The Price is Right once he recovered from his third cancer and in August 2025 visited Los Angeles for a taping. He wrote on the Fanatic website about the process of getting into the studio audience for the show but as it was not scheduled to air until June 2026, he could not reveal whether he was asked to “come on down” and participate.
