= Joe McDonald (baseball executive) =

American baseball executive (1929–2026)

- Born: July 5, 1929; New York City, U.S.
- Died: August 28, 2026 (aged 97)
- Occupation: Baseball executive

Joseph Anthony McDonald (July 5, 1929 – August 28, 2026) was an American front office executive in American Major League Baseball. He served as general manager of three MLB clubs between 1975 and 1992, and had a long career in the game as an administrator and a scout. Born in Staten Island, New York City, McDonald was a 1951 graduate of Fordham University.

== Long career with New York Mets ==
McDonald played prominent roles in the New York Mets' organization during his tenure there between 1962 and 1980. McDonald was the Mets' administrative secretary, minor league clubs, where he dealt with farm system operations in 1965–66. In 1967, he was the director of scouting. In 1968, he moved up and became director of minor league operations, and he stayed in that position until 1971. In 1972, he served as the Mets' director of player development operations. In 1973, he again became director of minor league operations, and he stayed in that position until October 1974, when he was promoted to general manager. He served in that role until 1978. In 1979, he was named a vice president and also worked as an assistant general manager. He stayed in that position until he was fired on February 21, 1980 when the team was sold.

== GM of Cardinals and Tigers ==
In 1981, he became the St. Louis Cardinals' executive assistant, where he served as an assistant general manager to Whitey Herzog, the Cards' GM and field manager. McDonald and Herzog had worked closely together in the Mets' farm system from 1966–72. He was assistant GM in St. Louis until April 10, 1982, when he became the Cardinals' general manager, thus enabling Herzog to focus on his on-field responsibilities. In his first season in that role, St. Louis won the National League pennant and 1982 World Series. McDonald served two more seasons as GM, then resigned from that post on January 3, 1985.

In 1987, he became the Detroit Tigers' director of player development (he also served as vice president). He stayed in that position until 1991, when he became a senior vice president as well as general manager through 1992.

== Scout for Angels, Rockies and Red Sox ==
McDonald later scouted for the California Angels, Colorado Rockies and in 2004 he became a scout at the professional level for the Boston Red Sox, based in Lakeland, Florida. He retired at age 90 after the 2019 season.

== Personal life and death ==
McDonald earned six World Series rings: 1969 with the Mets, 1982 with the Cardinals, and 2004, 2007, 2013 and 2018 with the Red Sox.

He married Yonkers native Teresa Mulcahy, and raised his family in a house owned by his inlaws on Morsemere Avenue in North Yonkers. His son, Jody is currently a sports talk radio host who has worked in Philadelphia and New York City. He also had two children who predeceased him, Marianne "Marni" McDonald-Trainor, and son Timothy McDonald.

McDonald died on August 28, 2026, at the age of 97.

| Preceded by Bob Scheffing | New York Mets General Manager; 1975–1980 | Succeeded by Frank Cashen |
| Preceded by Whitey Herzog | St. Louis Cardinals General Manager; 1982–1984 | Succeeded by Dal Maxvill |
| Preceded by Bill Lajoie | Detroit Tigers General Manager; 1991–1992 | Succeeded by Jerry Walker |
