= Ray Didinger =

American sportswriter (born 1946)

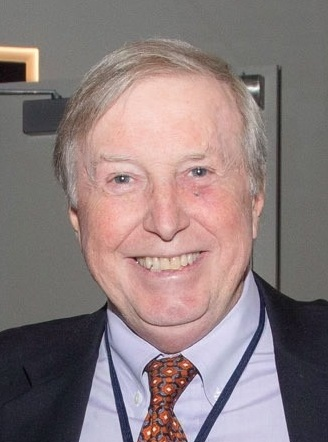
- Didinger in 2023
- Born: September 18, 1946 (age 80); Philadelphia, Pennsylvania, U.S.
- Education: Temple University (BS)
- Occupations: Sportswriter, sports commentator
- Spouse: Maria Gallagher
- Children: David, Kathleen
- Awards: Awards

Ray Didinger (born September 18, 1946) is an American sportswriter, radio personality, sports author and playwright.

== Early life ==
Born to Raymond and Marie Didinger, and raised in Folsom, Pennsylvania, Didinger graduated from St. James High School in 1964. He received a B.S. in Communications from Temple University in 1968. Didinger spent four years doing sports radio for WRTI, a public radio station owned by Temple, and served as the station's Sports Director.

== Career ==
=== Author ===
In 1990, Didinger wrote The Super Bowl: Celebrating a Quarter-Century of America's Greatest Game. He co-authored Football America: Celebrating Our National Passion along with Don Shula in 1996 and co-wrote The Eagles Encyclopedia with Robert S. Lyons in 2005. Didinger also co-wrote The Ultimate Book of Sports Movies with fellow-Philadelphia radio personality Glen Macnow in 2009. He wrote his memoir, Finished Business: My Fifty Years of Headlines, Heroes, and Heartaches Hardcover in 2021.

=== Radio ===
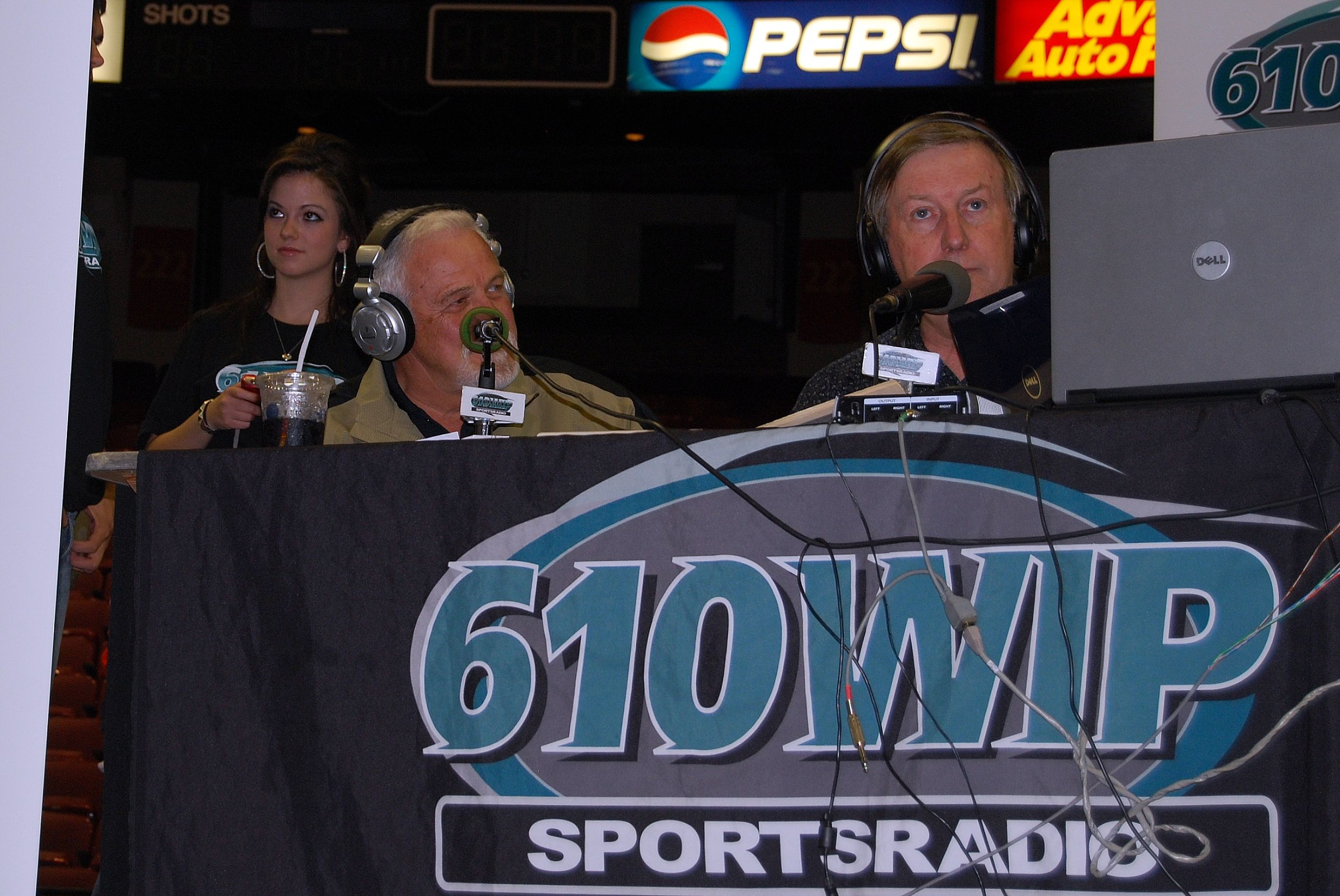
Ray Didinger (right) on 610 WIP with Bernie Parent

Didinger co-hosted a radio show every Saturday and Sunday from 10 a.m. to 1 p.m. on 94.1 WIP in Philadelphia with co-host Glen Macnow. The show featured Didinger and Macnow discussing aspects of Philadelphia sports. It was also common to hear the two talk about movies, since both are avid movie fans. Didinger and Macnow co-wrote a book entitled The Ultimate Book of Sports Movies, featuring what they both considered the all-time best in cinema sports dramas, published and released in 2009.

On May 8, 2022, during his radio show, Didinger announced his retirement when his contract ended on May 29, 2022, citing a desire to spend more time with his wife and family. In 2023, Didinger returned to WIP as an Eagles contributor in a part-time capacity for the station's morning show. Didinger typically appears on the show once each week during the Eagles season.

=== Sportswriter ===
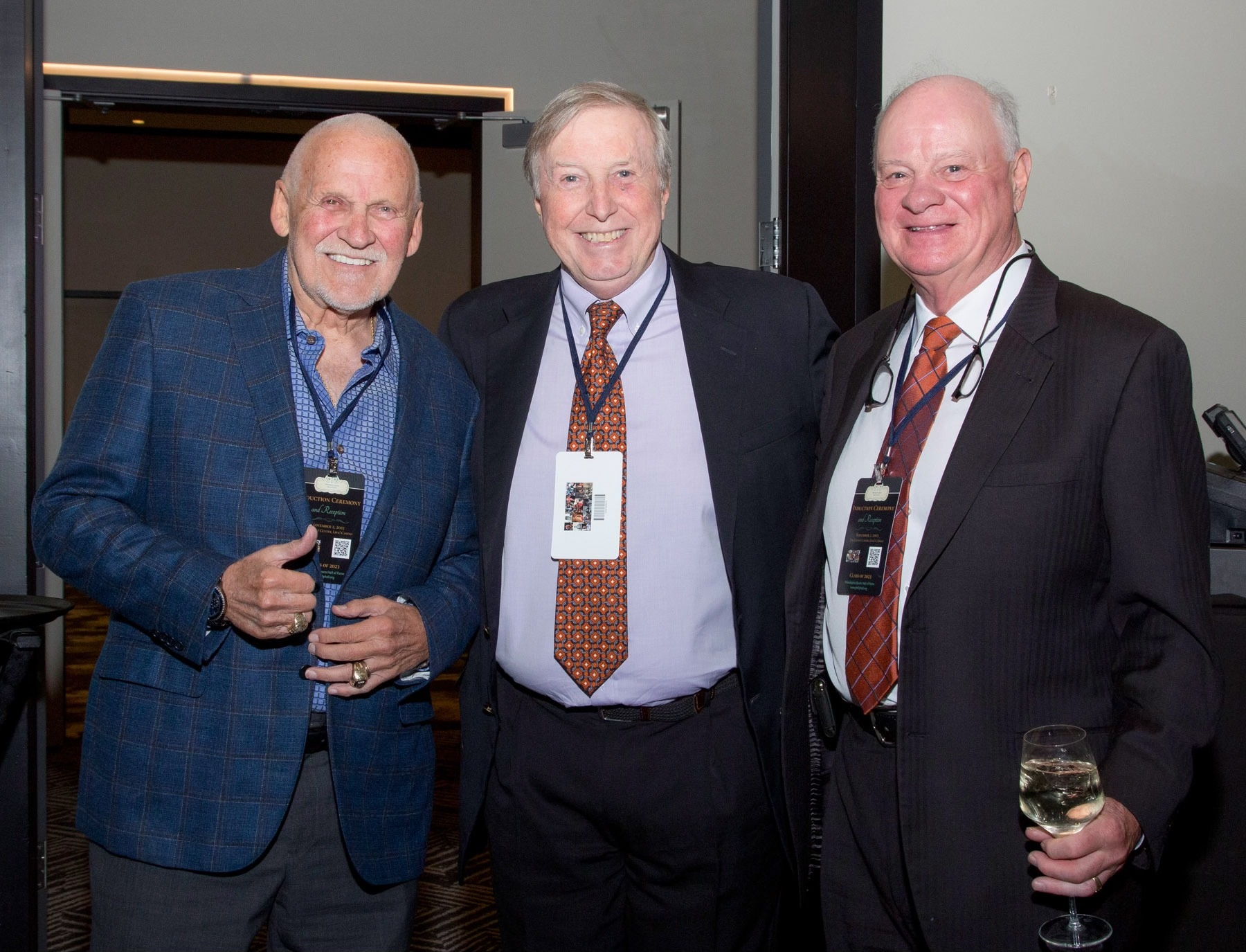
Ray Didinger (middle) with Bernie Parent (left)

Didinger covered the National Football League for The Philadelphia Bulletin and The Philadelphia Daily News for more than 25 years. He was named Pennsylvania Sportswriter of the Year five times by the National Sportscasters and Sportswriters Association. In 1995, he won the Dick McCann Memorial Award for long and distinguished coverage of pro football, and his name was added to the writers' honor roll in the Pro Football Hall of Fame in Canton, Ohio.

=== Television ===
Didinger served as a full-time member of NBC Sports Philadelphia, writing articles and appearing on-air in a variety of roles, most prominently in Eagles Pregame Live and Eagles Postgame Live. In 2022, he retired from his on-air role at NBC Sports Philadelphia. He briefly returned on-air for the 2022–23 NFL playoffs to cover the Eagles' run to Super Bowl LVII. Didinger was a senior producer with NFL Films in Mount Laurel, New Jersey until he was bought out of his contract in February 2009. He has won four Emmy Awards for his work as a writer and producer on the weekly series NFL Films Presents and the Turner Network Television documentary Football America.

=== Playwright ===
In 2016, Didinger wrote a 75-minute autobiographical play, Tommy and Me, about his lifelong connection with his childhood hero, Eagles wide receiver Tommy McDonald. The play follows Didinger as a young fan who befriended McDonald at the Eagles' training camp in Hershey, Pennsylvania, and later as an adult sports writer who campaigned for years to get McDonald elected into the Pro Football Hall of Fame.

== Personal ==
Didinger is married to Philadelphia magazine restaurant critic Maria Gallagher and has two children, David and Kathleen. He also has an English Bulldog named Mack. Ray and his wife are active with HeavenSent Bulldog Rescue (“HeavenSent”) a New Jersey non-profit corporation, dedicated to the rescue and placement for adoption of Bulldogs.

== Awards and honors ==
- Bill Nunn Award, 1995.
- Pennsylvania Sportswriter of the Year, 5-time winner.
- Keystone Press Awards, 6-time winner.
- Associated Press Award for Column Writing, 3-time winner.
- Pro Football Writers of America Award for Outstanding Feature Story, 1991.
- Member of the Philadelphia Sports Hall of Fame, 2005.
- "Reds" Bagnell Award, Maxwell Football Club, 2022.

== Bibliography ==
- The Super Bowl: Celebrating a Quarter-Century of America's Greatest Game (1990). Simon & Schuster ISBN 0-671-72798-2
- Football America: Celebrating Our National Passion with Phil Barber and Don Shula (1996). Turner Publishing ISBN 1-57036-297-1
- Game Plans For Success (1996). McGraw-Hill ISBN 0-8092-3171-9
- The Eagles Encyclopedia with Robert S. Lyons (2005). Temple University Press ISBN 1-59213-449-1
- One Last Read: The Collected Works of the World's Slowest Sportswriter (2007). Temple University Press ISBN 1-59213-600-1
- The Ultimate Book of Sports Movies with Glen Macnow (2009). Running Press ISBN 0-7624-3548-8
- Finished Business: My Fifty Years of Headlines, Heroes, and Heartaches Hardcover (2021). Temple University Press ISBN 1-43992060-5
