= WTEL (AM) =

Radio station in Philadelphia

- Philadelphia, Pennsylvania; United States
- Broadcast area: Philadelphia metropolitan area
- Frequency: 610 kHz
- Branding: Philadelphia's BIN 610

Programming
- Format: All-news radio for the Black community
- Network: Black Information Network

Ownership
- Owner: Beasley Broadcast Group; (Beasley Media Group Licenses, LLC)
- Operator: iHeartMedia, Inc.
- Sister stations: WBEN-FM; WMGK; WMMR; WPEN; WTMR; WWDB; WXTU

History
- First air date: March 17, 1922
- Former call signs: WIP (1922–2014)

Technical information
- Licensing authority: FCC
- Facility ID: 28626
- Class: B
- Power: 5,000 watts
- Transmitter coordinates: 39°51′55.4″N 75°6′32.6″W
- Repeater: 105.3 WDAS-FM HD2 (Philadelphia)

Links
- Public license information: Public file; LMS
- Webcast: Listen live (via iHeartRadio)
- Website: philadelphia.binnews.com

WTEL (610 kHz), branded "Philadelphia's BIN 610", is a commercial radio station licensed to serve Philadelphia, Pennsylvania. While owned by the Beasley Broadcast Group, the station is operated by iHeartMedia under a long-term local marketing agreement (LMA). It airs a Black–oriented all-news radio format as part of iHeart's Black Information Network (BIN). The station's studios are on City Avenue in Bala Cynwyd.

WTEL is powered at 5,000 watts using a directional antenna. Its two towers and transmitter are off Creek Road in Bellmawr, New Jersey, near Interstate 295. WTEL is also heard over the second HD Radio subchannel of WDAS-FM 105.3, and is available online via iHeartRadio. WTEL is a primary entry point for the Emergency Alert System in eastern Pennsylvania and Delaware.

== History ==
=== WIP ===
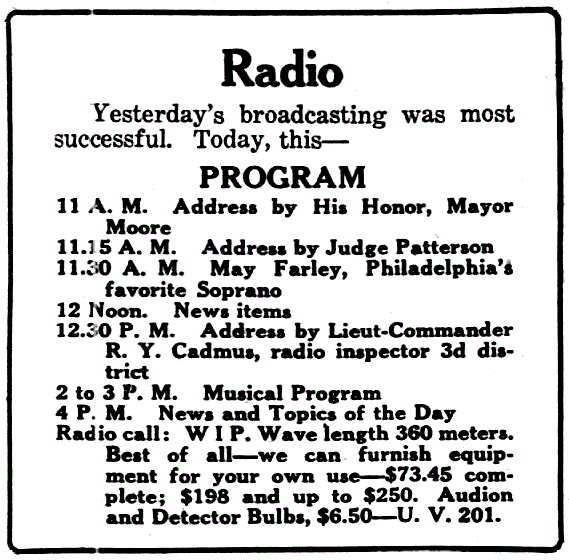
WIP's formal debut began at 11:00 a.m. on March 18, 1922, although it also claimed it made some preliminary transmissions the previous day, in its race to be the first Philadelphia department store to operate a radio station.

On December 1, 1921, the U.S. Department of Commerce, in charge of radio at the time, adopted a regulation formally establishing a broadcasting station category, which set aside the wavelength of 360 meters (833 kHz) for entertainment broadcasts, and 485 meters (619 kHz) for market and weather reports. Philadelphia's first broadcasting station, WGL, was licensed on February 8, 1922, to Thomas F. J. Howlett.

This was followed by a scramble among four of the city's department stores to become the first to establish its own station. On March 20, 1922 Gimbel Brothers, with Benedict Gimbel Jr. as its president, was issued a license with the randomly assigned call letters WIP, for a new station operating on the 360-meter "entertainment" wavelength. Although the WIP call sign was randomly assigned, later slogans based on the call letters have included "Wireless In Philadelphia", "We're In Philadelphia" and "Watch Its Progress". The station later received an additional authorization to broadcast weather reports on 485 meters.

The other three Philadelphia department store stations authorized in the first half of 1922 were WOO (licensed March 18, 1922, to John Wanamaker), WFI (later WFIL, licensed March 18, 1922, to Strawbridge & Clothier), and WDAR (later WLIT, licensed May 20, 1922, to the Lit Brothers).

Because 360 meters was the only designated broadcasting wavelength, WIP had to operate within the restrictions of a timesharing arrangement with the other local stations. In the race to be the first department store on the air, Strawbridge & Clothier's WFI debuted on March 18, starting with a 10:16 a.m. speech by John F. Braun, president of the Art Alliance and the Music League. WIP's formal debut came a short time later, beginning with an 11:00 a.m. speech by J. Hampton Moore, Mayor of Philadelphia. However, an advertisement placed by Gimbels on the previous day claimed that "Philadelphia's first radio broadcasting by any store, opened this morning at 9 o'clock", and, somewhat vaguely, "Details of programs will speedily unfold". The department store's March 18 advertisement for WIP further asserted that "Yesterday's broadcasting was most successful", although it provided no details about the nature of any earlier transmissions. Under the local timesharing agreement, WIP's August 17, 1922, schedule on 360 meters consisted of a variety of short programs, beginning with New York and Philadelphia stock price quotes at 1:00 pm, and ending with its "Uncle Wip" children's programs starting at 7:15 pm.

In late September 1922, the Department of Commerce set aside a second entertainment wavelength, 400 meters (750 kHz) for "Class B" stations that had quality equipment and programming, and WIP was assigned use of this more exclusive wavelength, joining WOO, WFI, and WDAR. WIP's March 27, 1923, time slots were entertainment programs from 2:00 to 3:00 and 6:00 to 6:30 pm, followed by "Uncle Wip's Bedtime Stories and roll call" beginning at 7:00 pm. In May 1923 additional "Class B" frequencies were made available, which included two Philadelphia allocations, with WIP and WOO assigned to 590 kHz on a timesharing basis, while WFI and WDAR were assigned to the second Philadelphia Class B frequency, 760 kHz. In late 1927 WIP and WOO were reassigned to 860 kHz.

On November 11, 1928, as part of the implementation of a major nationwide reallocation under the provisions of the Federal Radio Commission's General Order 40, WIP was assigned to a "regional" frequency, 610 kHz, along with a new timesharing partner, the Keystone Broadcasting Company's WFAN. On January 20, 1933, WIP's owners took over WFAN, eliminating that station to allow WIP to begin broadcasting on an unlimited schedule.

Beginning in the mid-1930s, WIP's Morning Cheer program presented by George A. Palmer was a popular daily feature. In the 1940s and 1950s, the station was an affiliate of the Mutual Broadcasting System. From the 1950s until the early 1960s, the station was owned by Metropolitan Broadcasting (successor to Dumont) and had a rock and roll format. In the early 60s the parent company name was changed from Metropolitan to Metromedia, and WIP adopted an MOR format (after an unsuccessful attempt at a Top 40 format branded as Color Radio). With this format, the station played pop hits of the 1960s, along with some 50s pop mixed in. Announcers during this time period included Joe McCauley (the "Morning Mayor"), Ned Powers, Tom Brown, and Chuck Daugherty.

During this time WIP called themselves "The Big W" after a phrase in the 1960s comedy, "It's A Mad, Mad, Mad, Mad World," and the slogan was justified. WIP was number one in the market ratings through the 1960s and for most of the 1970s. In the late 60s they began including more soft-rock until the format gradually evolved into an Adult Contemporary format which survived through the 1970s and into the 1980s. The music mix continued to include pop from the previous two decades. In addition, the station was full service in approach, as they had a heavy emphasis on news as well.

=== 1970s and 1980s ===
By the early 1970s, WIP evolved to an adult contemporary format, and for a while, they were heavy on 1950s and 1960s rock and roll oldies. At the height of its popularity as a full service/adult contemporary station in the early to mid-1970s, WIP was the home to some of the most well-known air personalities in the city, including popular rush hour host Ken Garland (who had replaced Joe McCauley, the "Morning Mayor"), late morning host Bill "Wee Willie" Webber, early afternoon host Tom Moran, late PM host, Dick Clayton, evening host Tom Lamaine, and overnight host Nat Wright. Weekend coverage included Allan Michaels, Alan Drew, Bill St. James, and Mark Andrews. During this time, Metromedia's station in New York, WNEW, had similar programming and it was not uncommon for DJs to swap back and forth for subbing duties. WNEW's Julius LaRosa was a frequent guest. WIP's presentation, like other full-service stations, was heavily dependent on its personalities to entertain the audience as much as the music itself.

In addition to music, full-service music stations in that era were typically home to strong news operations, and WIP had local newscasts every hour, seven days a week (at one point they offered half-hourly newscasts around the clock). The weekday morning news was so extensive that they had two anchors in later years, and even introduced a 5 a.m. 30-minute newscast. One of WIP's news reporters, Jan Gorham, remained with the station after the switch to sports and continued to work there until retiring in 2009.

The station hosted a popular radiothon for one weekend a year for several years, raising funds to fight leukemia. The events were staged on a large scale, in venues like hotel ballrooms, with local and national celebrities visiting the live broadcast.

WIP's best-known contest was Cash Call, a call-out game in which the DJs picked numbers out of the phone book or from postcards submitted by listeners. The intro to the contest was the first 10 seconds of a song called "The Sound Of Money" by the J's with Jamie, a vocal group that recorded many commercial jingles and three albums. If the person at the other end of the call could identify the exact amount of money in the "jackpot," down to the standard 61¢ ending, they won the current jackpot. Players who knew the 61¢ but not the dollar amount typically won a token prize from a sponsor. Every incorrect guess lead to a few dollars being added to the jackpot; a correct guess resulted in the jackpot being reset to $61.61. Another long-running contest late in WIP's run as a music station was Team Trivia. Two area businesses competed, one on the morning show with Ken Garland, the other on the afternoon show with (Bruce) Stevens and (Nick) Seneca (who had replaced Tom Moran).

As the popularity of music on FM radio grew, stations like Magic 103 (now 102.9 WMGK) and Kiss 100 began to eat away at WIP's audience. For a time, the station experimented with general interest talk. Michele Iaia was brought on to host "WIPeople Talk", a weeknight call-in show from 8 p.m. to midnight. The show later expanded to include a weekend edition, and over time the talk block was extended to run from 6 p.m. to 6 a.m. (with the station touting that it played music all day and talked all night). One of the regular features was a Friday night segment called Desperate & Dateless, a show that eventually spun off into a stand-alone Saturday night program that included music mixed in with the calls from single listeners.

The local talk was scaled back to make room for Larry King's syndicated radio show in the overnight hours, and eventually most of the local talk was replaced by music once again. The station later tried a programming experiment known as Midday Infotainment, a features-based midday show hosted by Bill Gallagher and Lynn Adkins. That move pushed Bill Webber out of his longtime midday slot into the early evening shift. The show was canceled in less than a year, and the regular music format, hosted once more by Webber, returned.

As WIP continued adding more current music, it also added the weekly countdown show "Dick Clark's National Music Survey." WIP aired the version produced for adult contemporary stations, while WSTW in Wilmington, Delaware, listenable in much of the Philadelphia market, aired the top 40 version.

=== Sports radio ===
In 1977, WIP became the radio home for the Philadelphia Flyers The station then gradually adopted a sports radio format in the late 1980s, and had been regarded in the industry for its influence on the Philadelphia sports fanbase headlined by prominent hosts Angelo Cataldi, Al Morganti and Howard Eskin, and was one of the first radio homes for Tony Bruno. WIP's transition to sports was gradual, unlike many so-called format flips that happen instantaneously. The station began adding sports programming in the mid-1980s, adding a daily sports program hosted by Howard Eskin in afternoon drive by September 1986. More and more sports hosts were brought on to replace the music hosts that left, including Ken Garland, who moved to cross-town WPEN, then a nostalgia-based music station. Garland was initially replaced by WIP part-timer Jeff Brown before the sports-based morning show debuted. Bill Webber's show, then limited to 9 a.m. to noon, was the last regularly scheduled weekday music program. Webber also would eventually join WPEN, hosting his familiar midday slot on Saturdays.

After many years of ownership by Metromedia the station was purchased by Ed Snider's Spectacor Group, the longtime owner of the National Hockey League's Philadelphia Flyers, in 1988. Snider sold the station to CBS Radio in 1994. WIP continued playing music on Saturday mornings for a short time before the transition to all-sports (save for an overnight talk show with Larry King/Jim Bohannon) was complete in November 1988. The morning show itself was converted to all-sports with the pairing of Angelo Cataldi and Tom Brookshier—dubbed Brookie and the Rookie—in November 1990.

Joe Conklin left WIP in January 2003, and was followed by Mike Missanelli that May 1; both joined WMMR to begin a morning show called Philly Guys. WIP later filed a restraining order against Conklin on May 23, 2003, over comments made about WIP on-air. Missanelli rejoined WIP in July 2005 to co-host a midday show with Anthony Gargano, but was fired on March 20, 2006, for on- and off-air altercations with workers. Missanelli's replacement, Steve Martorano, left WIP on March 25, 2008, with Glen Macnow as Gargano's co-host.

Throughout much of this era, WIP was also the flagship radio station for the Philadelphia Eagles and Philadelphia Phillies. When both teams were playing at the same time, WPHT and/or WYSP usually carried one of the games. WIP was the full-time flagship radio station for the Eagles until 1992, when Eagles broadcasts moved to WYSP. WIP retained coverage of the Philadelphia 76ers in 2005.

The station, and Angelo Cataldi, made headlines when Cataldi arranged for a group of Eagles fans to attend the 1999 NFL draft in New York City and demand the Eagles select University of Texas at Austin running back Ricky Williams with the team's No. 2 pick; this led to the infamous booing of the decision to select Donovan McNabb. Howard Eskin's achievements included a "funeral" for Terrell Owens following the announcement of Owens's four-game suspension from the Eagles during the 2005-2006 season, and a short-lived hunger strike in support of trading Philadelphia 76ers superstar Allen Iverson; Eskin was suspended by WIP for 30 days on September 9, 2004, to settle a defamation lawsuit brought by Richard Sprague, a lawyer for Iverson. Despite the controversies, WIP also hosted multiple programs co-hosted by sports stars, including Brian Dawkins and Maurice Cheeks, and co-produced with WAXY a weekly program with Terrell Owens hosted by Dan Le Batard. The station was also known for hosting the annual eating contest, the Wing Bowl, successor station WIP-FM would continue the event until 2018.

On February 20, 2008, the station announced that broadcasts of Eagles games would return to WIP, plus remain on WYSP, with each radio station broadcasting different feeds to make it easier for local fans to watch television coverage of Eagles games but to lower the volume on their TV and listen to the game on the radio. The advent of digital television signals was putting television and radio signals too far out of sync. The station also carried Philadelphia Phillies games on Friday nights during the 2005 season, allowing WPHT to pick up some regularly scheduled programming on Friday nights. In 2008, WIP broadcast the Phillies' March 31 season opener against Washington along with WPHT.

=== Transition to FM, trade to Beasley ===
Under the ownership of Infinity Broadcasting Corporation/CBS Radio during much of this era, WIP's call sign and format subsumed that of co-owned WYSP in 2011 to become WIP-FM, and was eventually traded to Beasley Broadcast Group to become the second incarnation of WTEL. From 2011 to 2020, this station was the market's full-time CBS Sports Radio affiliate, and later the market's full-time ESPN Radio outlet.

On September 2, 2011, WIP began simulcasting on 94.1 FM, replacing rock station WYSP. The simulcast of WIP and WIP-FM soon began to gradually split, as certain sporting events are not heard on both frequencies (such as most Philadelphia Phillies broadcasts, which began to air on WIP-FM in 2012 but are still carried on the AM dial by WPHT), and the syndicated The Nick & Artie Show was added to 610 AM's programming in February 2012, while local programming airs on WIP-FM; the simulcast ended entirely January 2, 2013, when WIP became a full-time affiliate of CBS Sports Radio, airing national programming to complement the local programming on WIP-FM.

On October 2, 2014, CBS Radio announced that it would trade 14 radio stations located in Tampa, Charlotte and Philadelphia (only WIP (AM) would be sold) to the Beasley Broadcast Group in exchange for 3 stations located in Miami and WRDW-FM and WXTU in Philadelphia. The swap was completed on December 1, 2014. As a result, WIP changed its call letters to WTEL, the longtime former call sign of Beasley-owned sister station WWDB, as CBS Radio (which has since been merged into Entercom) continued to own WIP-FM.

In early 2015, WTEL became an affiliate of ESPN Radio, dropping affiliation with CBS Sports Radio. The station began airing Mike and Mike in the Morning on April 20, 2015, on the day that former ESPN affiliate WPEN started a local morning show with former WIP host Anthony Gargano. WPEN continues to be affiliated with ESPN, but only airs live sporting events distributed by the network. WTEL airs ESPN shows almost around the clock, except for Philadelphia Union Soccer Games, the Philadelphia Phillies farm team, the Reading Fightin Phils, Villanova Mens Basketball, Villanova Football and public access shows on weekends which include food, real estate, gardening and Italian-American programs.

=== Leasing to iHeartMedia, format change ===
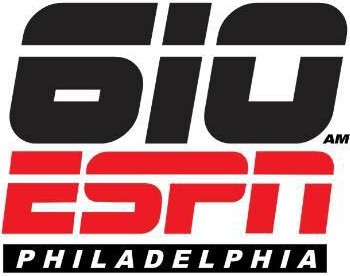
final logo as 610 ESPN, 2015-2020

On August 18, 2020, it was initially reported by Philadelphia sports blog Crossing Broad, and later independently verified by radio news website RadioInsight, that Beasley Broadcast Group would end the sports format on WTEL. It planned to lease its operation to iHeartMedia, Inc.

Upon closure of the leasing agreement on August 31, the station became the Philadelphia affiliate of iHeart's Black Information Network, an all-news radio format targeting Black listeners. It would also be simulcast on 105.3 WDAS-FM's HD2 subchanel.

== Notable former on-air staff ==
- Michael Barkann
- Tom Brookshier
- Tony Bruno
- Bill Campbell
- Craig Carton
- Angelo Cataldi
- Garry Cobb
- Pat Croce
- Ray Didinger
- Howard Eskin
- Keith Jones
- Glen Macnow
- John Marzano
- Mike Missanelli
- Al Morganti
- Ike Reese
- Bill "Wee Willie" Webber

== See also ==
- List of initial AM-band station grants in the United States
