= Philadelphia Phillies Radio Network =

Official radio network of MLB's Philadelphia Phillies

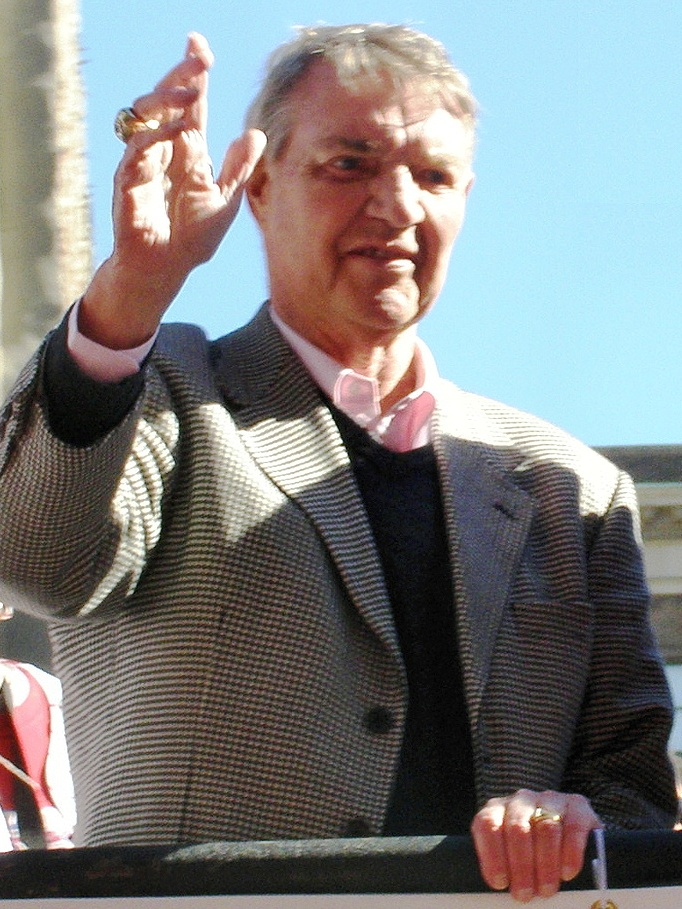
Harry Kalas, who called Philadelphia Phillies games on radio and television from 1971 until his death in 2009

The Philadelphia Phillies Radio Network is a network of 17 radio stations in Pennsylvania, Delaware, and New Jersey that air Major League Baseball games of the Philadelphia Phillies. The lead announcers are Scott Franzke with play-by-play and Larry Andersen with color commentary. The flagship station is WIP-FM 94.1 in Philadelphia. The broadcasts were discontinued on the former AM flagship station WPHT 1210 in 2016 (both stations share the same ownership and the move from WPHT was done to reduce pre-emptions of its talk radio schedule).

WTTM in Lindenwold, New Jersey and WWAC in Atlantic City, New Jersey also air a separate broadcast in Spanish. Oscar Budejen is the play by play announcer, while Bill Kulik provides color commentary.

== Affiliates ==
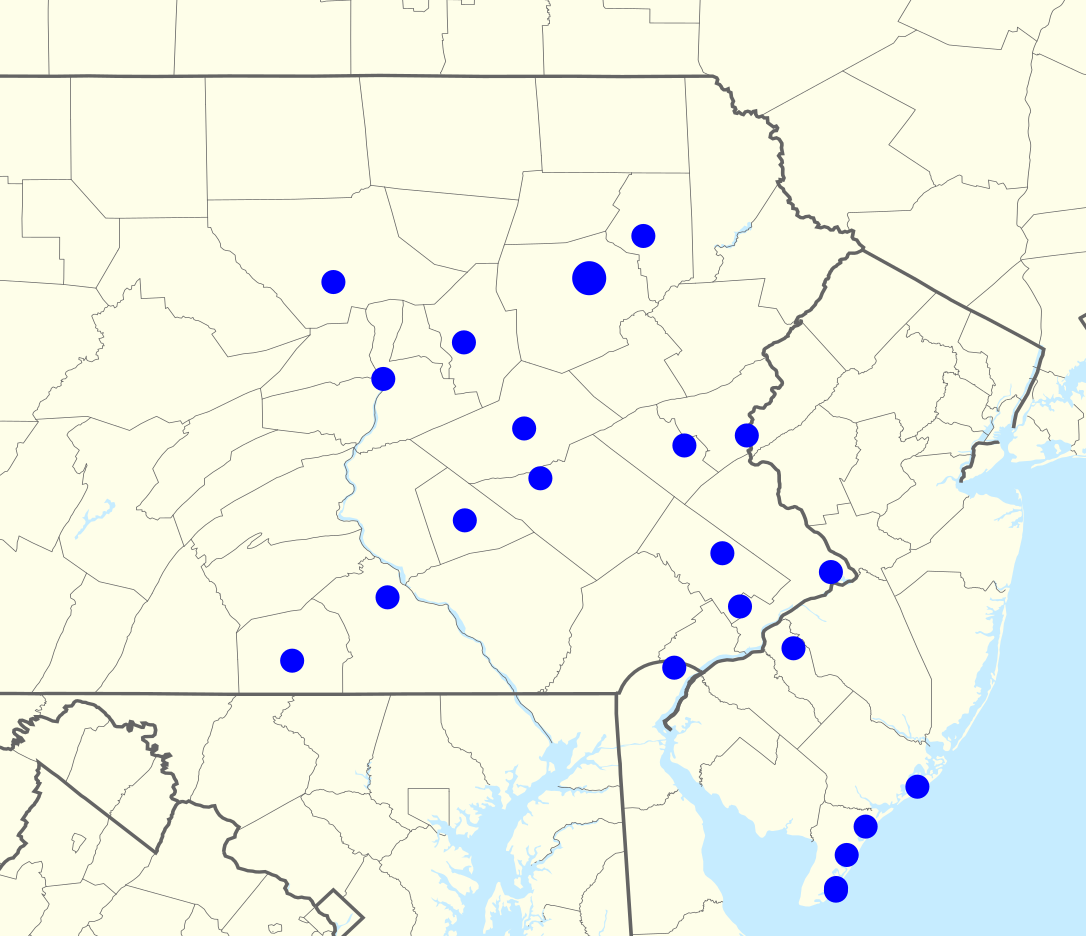
Map of radio affiliates in 2017

City/market	State	Station	Frequency	Network status
Wilmington	Delaware	WDEL	1150 AM	Affiliate
Canton	New Jersey	WDEL-FM	101.7 FM	Affiliate
Lindenwold	New Jersey	WTTM	1680 AM	Flagship (Spanish)
Wildwood	New Jersey	WZXL	100.7 FM	Affiliate
Allentown	Pennsylvania	WSAN	1470 AM	Affiliate
Easton	Pennsylvania	WEST	1400 AM	Affiliate (Spanish)
Bloomsburg	Pennsylvania	WHLM	930 AM	Affiliate
Gettysburg	Pennsylvania	WGET	1320 AM	Affiliate
Lansdale	Pennsylvania	WNPV	1440 AM	Affiliate (part-time)
Levittown	Pennsylvania	WBCB	1490 AM	Affiliate (part-time)
Philadelphia	Pennsylvania	WIP-FM	94.1 FM	Flagship
Pottsville	Pennsylvania	WPPA	1360 AM	Affiliate
Reading	Pennsylvania	WEEU	830 AM	Affiliate
Scranton	Pennsylvania	WEJL	630 AM	Affiliate
Sunbury	Pennsylvania	WKOK	1070 AM	Affiliate
Wilkes-Barre	Pennsylvania	WFUZ	1240 AM	Affiliate
Williamsport	Pennsylvania	WRAK	1400 AM	Affiliate

=== Current Producers ===
- Mike Angelina
- Tucker Bagley
- Nick Earnshaw
- Jack Fritz
- Francisco Rojas
- Dan "Buzz" Wilson

== See also ==
- List of current MLB announcers
- Broadcasting of sports events
- List of Sirius Satellite Radio stations
- List of XM Satellite Radio channels
