= Eliot Shorr-Parks =

American journalist and sports radio personality (born 1986)

- Born: November 2, 1986 (age 39); Philadelphia, Pennsylvania, U.S.
- Education: Temple University (BA)
- Occupations: Journalist; Radio host
- Known for: Philadelphia Eagles reporter for 94.1 WIP

Eliot Shorr-Parks (born November 2, 1986), also known by his initials ESP, is an American journalist, author and sports radio personality for 94.1 WIP in Philadelphia. He is WIP's beat reporter for the Philadelphia Eagles. Prior to joining WIP, Shorr-Parks was the Eagles beat reporter for NJ.com.

== Early life ==
Shorr-Parks was born on November 2, 1986, and grew up in Philadelphia. His father Steve Parks is a writing professor at the University of Virginia. His mother, Lori Shorr, is former Chief Education Officer for Philadelphia and is currently a professor at Temple University. Shorr-Parks graduated from Central High School in Philadelphia. He attended Juniata College from 2006 to 2008, but transferred to Temple University and graduated with a degree in broadcast journalism in 2011.

== Career ==
After graduating from Temple, Shorr-Parks worked as an intern for Gcobb.com, which allowed him to begin covering the Eagles.

Shorr-Parks began covering the Eagles for Daily Local News in 2011. He joined SB Nation the next year as their Eagles beat reporter for Bleeding Green Nation.

In 2012, at age 24, Shorr-Parks published the book More Than a Game: Life Lessons from Philadelphia's Sports Communities. Written over a period of two and a half years, the book includes more than 30 stories of the impact of sports in Philadelphia. Areas covered in the book included the Sonny Hill Basketball League.

From 2012 until 2018, Shorr-Parks was the Eagles reporter for NJ.com. There he also hosted their Eagle's podcast The No-Huddle Show for three years. In 2014, Shorr-Parks wrote a bombshell article revealing that the Eagles had concerns regarding wide receiver DeSean Jackson and his gang connections. Minutes after the story broke, the Eagles released Jackson. In 2024, on The 25/10 Show, Jackson went into the details leading up his controversial release, namely how he supported the legal defense a childhood friend, his own clean record, and how the article unfairly damaged his reputation. The sports podcast requested an apology from Shorr-Parks.

Shorr-Parks joined 94.1 WIP in 2018 and serves as their beat reporter on the Eagles. He is a frequent contributor to the station's shows. He also hosts Go Birds, an Eagles podcast, and Go Birds Radio, a weekly Saturday Eagles radio show on 94.1 WIP. Additionally, Shorr-Parks hosts The Best Football Show, an Audacy podcast.
