= Bill Lajoie =

American professional baseball player, manager, scout and front-office executive

- Born: September 27, 1934; Wyandotte, Michigan, U.S.
- Died: December 28, 2010 (aged 76); Sarasota, Florida, U.S.
- Occupation: Baseball executive

William Richard Lajoie (September 27, 1934 – December 28, 2010) was an American professional baseball player, manager, scout and front-office executive. The general manager of the Detroit Tigers of Major League Baseball from 1984 to 1990, he helped to build, then served as GM of, the world champion 1984 Tigers.

== Biography ==
Born in Wyandotte, Michigan, Lajoie attended Western Michigan University, earning a Bachelor of Science degree in 1956. An All-American athlete at WMU, he was signed by the Baltimore Orioles organization following graduation. After a nine-year playing career as a minor league outfielder in farm systems of the Orioles, Brooklyn/Los Angeles Dodgers, Cincinnati Reds and Minnesota Twins, Lajoie became a scout and minor league manager with Cincinnati.

He then joined the Tigers organization in 1969 as a member of the scouting department. By 1979 he was named the assistant general manager to Tigers GM Jim Campbell. During his time as GM, Lajoie is credited with several transactions that helped the Tigers to the 1984 World Series championship and a 1987 division title. Notable transactions include signing aging veteran Darrell Evans in 1984; trading John Smoltz for Doyle Alexander in 1987, and Kirk Gibson's departure as a free agent following the 1987 season. The Smoltz trade helped the Tigers make the playoffs in 1987, as Alexander posted 9 wins and 0 losses in 11 starts, with a 1.53 earned run average. Smoltz, at the time, was a lightly regarded prospect in the low minor leagues. However, the trade is now ridiculed by Tigers fans since the Tigers didn’t get nearly enough in the long run. Alexander was out of baseball by 1989, while Smoltz went on to a Hall of Fame career mostly with the Atlanta Braves.

After an internal power struggle in 1990 (the Tigers had hired Bo Schembechler as team president), Lajoie resigned was replaced as Tigers GM by his assistant, Joe McDonald.

He then served as a special assistant or consultant to the Braves (1991–98), Milwaukee Brewers (2001–02), Boston Red Sox (2003–06), Los Angeles Dodgers (2006–09) and Pittsburgh Pirates (2009–10).

Lajoie played a high-profile consulting role in the Boston front office during the brief interregnum between November 2005 and February 2006 caused by the temporary resignation of Red Sox general manager Theo Epstein. He was the senior baseball official, under president/CEO Larry Lucchino, with the Red Sox delegation to the 2005 winter baseball meetings and was instrumental in the multi-player trade with the Florida Marlins that netted pitcher Josh Beckett and third baseman Mike Lowell; both were key figures in the club's 2007 world championship. A few days later, he traded Red Sox starting shortstop Édgar Rentería to the Atlanta Braves for third baseman prospect Andy Marte. However, upon Epstein's return, Lajoie resigned, and a few weeks later became a top advisor to Dodgers general manager Ned Colletti. He joined Pittsburgh in a similar role in June 2009, assisting GM Neal Huntington.

In 1988, Lajoie was honored with a distinguished alumni award from the Western Michigan University Alumni Association. In 2026, Lajoie was honored with induction into the Michigan Sports Hall of Fame.

As a front office member, Lajoie won World Series Championships with the Detroit Tigers in 1984, the Atlanta Braves in 1995, and the Boston Red Sox in 2004.

He died at age 76 near Sarasota, Florida.

Preceded by Jim Campbell	Detroit Tigers general manager 1984–1990	Succeeded by Joe McDonald
