= Glen Macnow =

American journalist

Glen Harry Macnow (born April 23, 1955) was a longtime American sports talk radio host on 94 WIP in Philadelphia, Pennsylvania.

== Background ==
Macnow was born in New York City on April 23, 1955, and raised in Buffalo, New York. He went to Boston University (with WIP co-worker Al Morganti), and worked a newspaper career that took him from Cocoa Beach, Florida to Fort Lauderdale, Florida to Detroit, Michigan, and, finally to The Philadelphia Inquirer in 1986. During his time with the Inquirer, in 1993, he was recognized as "The Best Sportswriter in Philadelphia" by Philadelphia magazine.

Glen is often referred to as "The Prof" or "The Professor" due to his longtime position as a journalism professor at St. Joseph's University.

He is married to his wife Judy and is the father of two sons, Ted and Alex, both of whom work as physicians.

== Writer ==
Macnow has written more than a dozen children's books, mostly sports biographies. He has also written three top-selling Philadelphia sports books during his time on WIP. In 2003, he co-authored The Great Philadelphia Fan Book with Anthony Gargano. The book is a Philadelphia sports memoir, centering on the city's sports fans and 4 professional teams. In 2004, he co-authored The Great Philadelphia Sports Debate with Angelo Cataldi. In 2006, he co-authored The Great Book of Philadelphia Sports Lists with Edward Gudonis, a.k.a. Big Daddy Graham. In 2009, Macnow co-authored The Ultimate Book of Sports Movies with Ray Didinger which included a foreword by Gene Hackman. In 2011, he co-authored The Ultimate Book of Gangster Movies with George Anastasia. In 2019, Macnow and Big Daddy Graham teamed up again to release an updated version of The Great Book of Philadelphia Sports Lists, which included more recent Philadelphia sports achievements, including the 2008 Philadelphia Phillies season which resulted in a World Series championship, and the 2017 Philadelphia Eagles season which resulted in a victory of Super Bowl LII.

Macnow is known for some of his off-sports shows, including the "Movie Club for Men," a regular summer feature, and his annual "food hunt," which searches for the best of a particular "manly" food item (burgers, pizza, ribs, cheesesteaks, etc.) in the Philadelphia metropolitan area. He also co-hosts a TV show with Lew Bryson, called What's Brewing, in which they travel to local breweries and beer retailers throughout the Delaware Valley to talk about all aspects of beer. The show was previously co-hosted with Don Russell, a.k.a. Joe Sixpack. It airs weekly on NBC Sports Philadelphia networks, with 4-5 re-airs throughout the week.

In 2016, Macnow was inducted into the Philadelphia Jewish Sports Hall of Fame. Macnow retired from WIP-FM after 31 years on the air in 2024. His final show was on July 13.

Aside from sports, Macnow enjoys acting. He has performed on both stage and screen, mostly at the Players Club of Swarthmore, where he is a regular. Macnow is also a part-owner of the Conshohocken Brewing Company.

== Bibliography ==
- Alex Rodriguez (Sports Great) ISBN 0-7660-1845-8
- Allen Iverson (Sports Great) ISBN 0-7660-2063-0
- Cal Ripken, Jr. (Sports Great) ISBN 0-89490-387-X
- Cal Ripken, Jr.: Star Shortstop (Sports Reports) ISBN 0-89490-485-X
- Charles Barkley (Sports Great Books) ISBN 0-7660-1004-X
- Chris Webber (Sports Great) ISBN 0-7660-1069-4
- David Robinson: Star Center (Sports Reports) ISBN 0-89490-483-3
- Deion Sanders (Sports Great) ISBN 0-7660-1068-6
- Denver Broncos Football Team (Great Sports Teams), The ISBN 0-7660-1489-4
- Great Book of Philadelphia Sports Lists, The ISBN 0-7624-2840-6
- Great Philadelphia Fan Book, The ISBN 0-9705804-4-4
- Great Philadelphia Sports Debate, The ISBN 0-9754419-1-4
- Jeff Gordon (Sports Great) ISBN 0-7660-1469-X
- Ken Griffey, Jr: Star Outfielder (Sports Reports) ISBN 0-89490-802-2
- Kevin Garnett (Sports Great) ISBN 0-7660-1263-8
- Kobe Bryant (Sports Great) ISBN 0-7660-1264-6
- Philadelphia 76ers Basketball Team, The (Great Sports Teams) ISBN 0-7660-1751-6
- Philadelphia Flyers Hockey Team (Great Sports Teams), The ISBN 0-7660-1279-4
- Shaquille O'Neal: Star Center (Sports Reports) ISBN 0-89490-656-9
- Tiger Woods (Sports Great) ISBN 0-7660-1468-1
- Troy Aikman (Sports Great) ISBN 0-89490-593-7
