= NBC Sports Philadelphia =

American regional sports network

- Country: United States
- Broadcast area: Eastern and Central Pennsylvania; Northern and Central Delaware; Southern and Central New Jersey
- Network: NBC Sports Regional Networks
- Headquarters: Xfinity Mobile Arena, Philadelphia

Programming
- Languages: English; Spanish (via SAP)
- Picture format: 1080i (HDTV); 480i (SDTV)

Ownership
- Owner: NBC Sports Group (75%); Philadelphia Phillies (25%)
- Sister channels: Cable: NBC Sports Philadelphia Plus; Broadcast: WCAU/Philadelphia; WWSI/Mount Laurel; Streaming: Peacock

History
- Launched: October 1, 1997; 28 years ago
- Replaced: PRISM (1976–1997); SportsChannel Philadelphia (1990–1997)
- Former names: Comcast SportsNet Philadelphia (1997–2017)

Links
- Website: www.nbcsportsphiladelphia.com

Availability (some events may air on NBC Sports Philadelphia Plus, which serves as a overflow feed during event conflicts)

Streaming media
- Peacock: peacocktv.com (U.S. internet subscribers in eligible area only; requires add-on to subscription to access content)
- YouTubeTV: Internet Protocol television
- Hulu Live: Internet Protocol television
- FuboTV: Internet Protocol television

NBC Sports Philadelphia (NBCSP) is an American regional sports network owned by the NBC Sports Group unit of NBCUniversal, which in turn is owned by locally based cable television provider Comcast (and owns a controlling 75% interest), and the Philadelphia Phillies (which owns the remaining 25%). It is the flagship owned-and-operated outlet of NBC Sports Regional Networks. The channel broadcasts regional coverage of professional sports teams in the Philadelphia metropolitan area, as well as college sports events and original sports-related news, discussion and entertainment programming.

NBC Sports Philadelphia is available on cable, fiber optic, and streaming television providers throughout the Philadelphia metropolitan area, which includes southeastern Pennsylvania, southern New Jersey, and most of Delaware. The network is also available on IPTV providers in those areas as well as throughout the entire state of Pennsylvania.

Beginning in 2025, NBC Sports Philadelphia has been available via sister streaming service Peacock as an add-on feature.

The network maintains main studios and offices located inside the Xfinity Mobile Arena in the South Philadelphia Sports Complex.

== History ==
The network traces its history to March 19, 1996, when Comcast acquired a 66 percent stake in Spectacor, the parent company of the Philadelphia Flyers, The Spectrum and the then-recently completed CoreStates Center, for $240 million and the assumption of a collective $170 million in debt. Ed Snider, the previous majority owner of Spectacor, stayed on as the managing partner and chairman of the renamed Comcast Spectacor. On the day the deal closed, Comcast Spectacor immediately purchased a 66% interest in the Philadelphia 76ers.

Immediately after the purchase was announced, speculation arose as to whether Comcast would let at least some of Spectacor's television contracts with premium cable network PRISM and existing regional sports network SportsChannel Philadelphia (both owned by Rainbow Media) run out, and create a sports network of its own, displacing both existing networks from Comcast and other cable providers in Southeastern Pennsylvania (Comcast, however, had reached a ten-year agreement with Rainbow to continue carriage of PRISM and SportsChannel, as well as the company's other networks in the fall of 1995); buy the existing networks; or reach a complex deal with Rainbow to have both networks retain the broadcast rights to the 76ers and Flyers.

Within days of the purchase, Comcast indicated that it was considering launching a new regional sports network, and approached the Philadelphia Phillies about entering into a broadcast deal. PRISM and SportsChannel Philadelphia's joint contract to carry most of the Flyers' NHL games was set to end that fall, while the Phillies' contract ended after the 1997 season, leaving them both open to enter negotiations with Comcast Spectacor.

After short-lived discussions between Rainbow Media and Comcast about the latter possibly becoming a part-owner in PRISM and SportsChannel Philadelphia, on April 25, 1996, Comcast Spectacor formally announced plans to create a new Philadelphia-centric sports network, which would carry both the Flyers and Sixers; it also signed a deal with the Phillies, giving the new network rights to most of their Major League Baseball games. The deal strained relations between Rainbow and Comcast Spectacor somewhat; Rainbow offered a lower bid for the Flyers telecast rights during negotiations for a one-year extension of its contract. Disagreements between the Flyers and Rainbow Media over the amount the team would receive for the 1996–97 season contract led the Flyers to announce plans in late September that it would assume production responsibilities for its home game broadcasts and sell the local rights to its game telecasts to individual cable providers as a backup plan if deal did not come to fruition. Rainbow and Comcast Spectacor finally reached a one-year, $5 million contract extension to keep its locally televised games on PRISM and SportsChannel on October 4, 1996, the day before its season home opener.

On July 21, 1997, Comcast acquired the local television rights to broadcast the 76ers' NBA games on the new Comcast SportsNet Philadelphia, with the team choosing to opt out of its contract with PRISM and SportsChannel that was set to run until the 1999–2000 season. After much uncertainty, which included plans for PRISM and SportsChannel to become affiliates of Fox Sports Net (after News Corporation and Liberty Media purchased 40% of the sports assets owned by Rainbow parent Cablevision on June 30, 1997), Comcast then reached agreements with Liberty and Rainbow Media to replace PRISM with the Liberty-owned premium movie channel Starz! (which at the time, was starting to expand its carriage outside of systems operated by its then co-owner Tele-Communications, Inc.).

Reports indicated that Comcast SportsNet initially would charge a per subscriber rate of $1.50 a month (representatives for Comcast Spectacor stated the rate was closer to the range of $1.20 to $1.35) to participating cable providers, described as "one of the most expensive – if not the most expensive" basic cable channel in the United States (a distinction that was eventually assumed by the nationally distributed ESPN); SportsChannel Philadelphia, by comparison, charged providers that carried the network between 25¢ and 35¢ a month per subscriber. The company's demand that CSN Philadelphia be offered as a basic cable service resulted in complaints by some local providers (including Wade Cable, Lower Bucks Cablevision and Harron Communications) because of the higher per subscriber rate; however, Jack Williams, who was appointed as the original president of CSN Philadelphia, said that the company would "not accept any arrangement other than running SportsNet as a basic channel." By September 1997, CSN had secured cable coverage reaching approximately 1.5 million households (or 60% of the network's regional territory).

Williams promised that the network would carry more local programming than other regional sports networks, with an estimated seven to eight hours of live sports, and various news and discussion programs (including a four-hour morning sports news program, and news and interview program in the late afternoon).

Comcast SportsNet Philadelphia launched on October 1, 1997, replacing SportsChannel Philadelphia on local cable systems within the Philadelphia metropolitan area; with the launch, Comcast SportsNet became the Philadelphia affiliate of Fox Sports Net. Comcast expanded the Comcast SportsNet brand to other markets over the next several years, through the purchases of Fox Sports regional networks in San Francisco and Boston as well as the launches of new channels in markets such as Chicago, Houston and northern California.

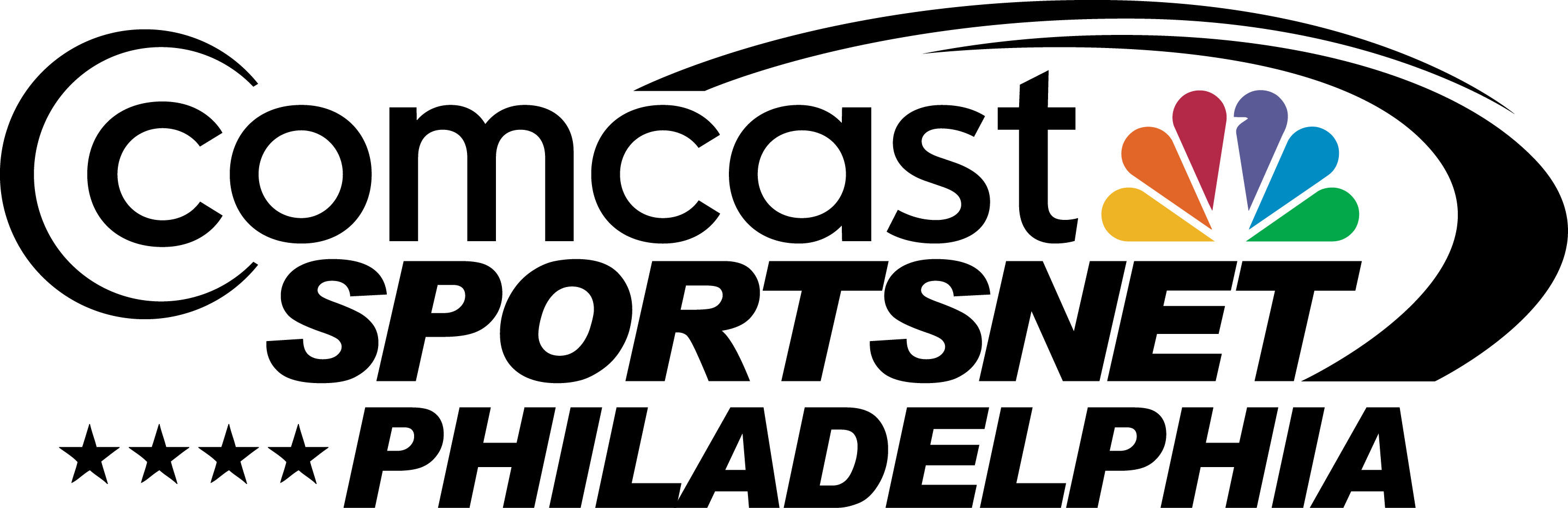
Comcast SportsNet Philadelphia logo from September 2012 through 2016

With Comcast's acquisition of NBCUniversal in 2011, Comcast SportsNet was also integrated into the new NBC Sports Group unit, culminating with the addition of the peacock logo and an updated graphics package to mirror that of its parent network. The updated graphics were implemented on CSN's live game coverage and all studio shows, with the exception of SportsNet Central. In September 2012, Comcast SportsNet Philadelphia and its sister Comcast SportsNet outlets ceased carrying Fox Sports Networks-supplied programming, after failing to reach an agreement to continue carrying FSN's nationally distributed programs. On January 2, 2014, as part of an agreement reached on a 25-year broadcasting contract with the team (with the network paying the team $100 million in rights fees each season through 2041, totaling around $2.5 billion), the Philadelphia Phillies acquired a 25% equity stake in Comcast SportsNet Philadelphia.

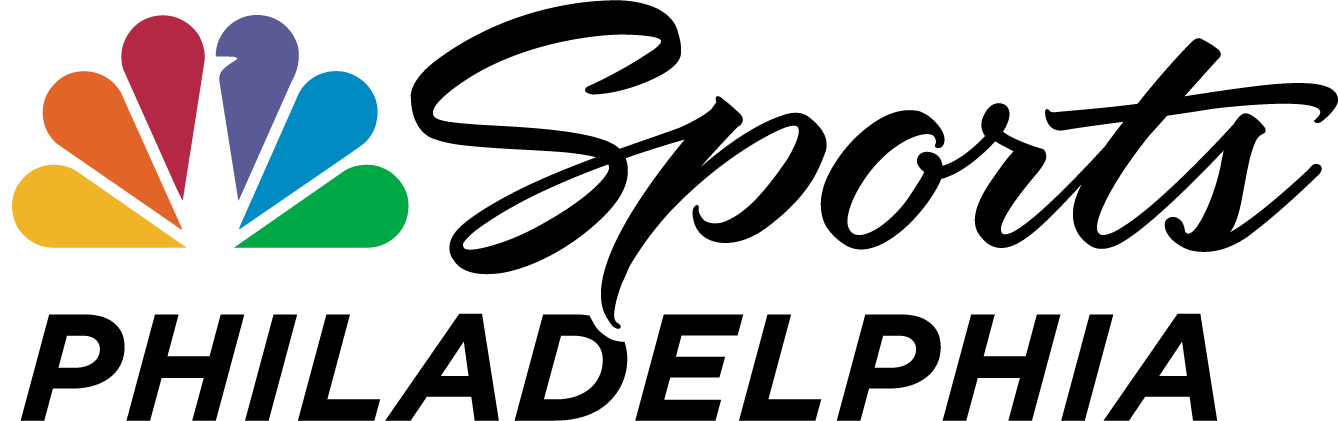
Logo of NBC Sports Philadelphia used from October 2, 2017, until 2023

Comcast rebranded the network as NBC Sports Philadelphia on October 2, 2017, as part of a larger rebranding of the Comcast SportsNet networks under the NBC Sports brand.

== Programming ==
=== Sports coverage ===
NBC Sports Philadelphia holds the regional television rights to the NBA's Philadelphia 76ers, NHL's Philadelphia Flyers, and the Philadelphia Phillies of Major League Baseball. In addition to live game telecasts, the network carries pre-game and post-game shows under the Pregame Live and Postgame Live banners that bookend 76ers (Sixers Pregame Live and Sixers Postgame Live), Phillies (Phillies Pregame Live and Phillies Postgame Live), Flyers (Flyers Pregame Live and Flyers Postgame Live) telecasts. Since 2010, the network has also produced the Phillies' Opening Day game and other select Phillies regular season games for NBC-owned-and-operated sister station WCAU (channel 10). Although it does not hold the regional rights to NFL games involving the Philadelphia Eagles, the network produces pre-game and post-game shows before and after every Eagles game (Eagles Pregame Live and Eagles Postgame Live).

The network formerly broadcast select Major League Soccer matches involving the Philadelphia Union until 2023, when the entire league switched to MLS Season Pass for all regular season match broadcasts. The network also served as the broadcaster for American Hockey League games involving the Philadelphia Phantoms (an affiliate team of the Flyers) until the team relocated to Glens Falls, New York as the Adirondack Phantoms in 2009. It also carried indoor soccer matches involving the Philadelphia KiXX from 1998 until the National Professional Soccer League folded in 2001; as well as National Lacrosse League games featuring the Philadelphia Wings until that team relocated to Uncasville, Connecticut as the New England Black Wolves in 2014.

NBC Sports Philadelphia also maintains the television rights to the Philadelphia Big 5, carrying select games of the annual Big 5 Classic tournament. It also broadcasts numerous men's and women's college sporting events sanctioned by the Atlantic 10 Conference, the Ivy League, and the Coastal Athletic Association. Beginning in 2022, NBC Sports Philadelphia broadcasts college football and men's and women's college basketball home games for Monmouth University. Until Comcast SportsNet discontinued its relationship with its competing RSN in September 2012, the network also carried collegiate sports events from Conference USA, the Pac-12 Conference and the Big 12 Conference, as well as primetime Major League Baseball games on Thursdays distributed by Fox Sports Networks.

=== Other programming ===
==== News ====
- SportsNet Central

Talk

- Unfiltered with Ricky Bo & Bill Colarulo (simulcast with 97.5 WPEN)

==== Phillies ====
- Phillies Clubhouse
- Phillies Nation

Eagles

- Birds Huddle

==== Golf ====
- Inside Golf
- Winning Golf

==== Former ====
- Daily News Live (1997–2013)
- Philly Sports Talk (2013–2019)

== On-air staff ==
=== Current on-air staff ===
- Alaa Abdelnaby – 76ers color commentator
- Rubén Amaro Jr. – Phillies color commentator, Phillies Pregame Live and Phillies Postgame Live analyst
- Jason Avant – Eagles Pregame Live and Eagles Postgame Live analyst
- Michael Barkann – Eagles Pregame Live and Eagles Postgame Live host, Phillies Pregame Live and Phillies Postgame Live host
- Ricky Bottalico – Phillies Pregame Live and Phillies Postgame Live analyst
- Brian Boucher – Flyers color commentator
- Barrett Brooks – Birds Huddle host, Eagles Pregame Live and Eagles Postgame Live analyst
- Ben Davis – Phillies color commentator, Phillies Pregame Live and Phillies Postgame Live analyst
- Scott Hartnell – Flyers color commentator, Flyers Pregame Live and Flyers Postgame Live analyst
- Jim Jackson – Flyers play-by-play announcer
- Marc Jackson – Sixers Pregame Live and Sixers Postgame Live analyst
- John Kruk – Phillies color commentator
- Jim Lynam – Sixers Pregame Live and Sixers Postgame Live analyst
- Tom McCarthy – Phillies play-by-play announcer
- Al Morganti – Flyers Pregame Live and Flyers Postgame Live analyst
- Kate Scott – 76ers play-by-play announcer

=== Notable former on-air staff ===
- Ron Burke
- Ray Didinger
- Scott Hanson
- Neil Hartman
- Ron Jaworski
- Keith Jones
- Seth Joyner
- Jillian Mele
- Jamie Moyer
- Gregg Murphy
- Leila Rahimi
- Matt Stairs
- Matt Yallof

== NBC Sports Philadelphia Plus ==
Logo of NBC Sports Philadelphia Plus, a sister channel of NBC Sports Philadelphia

NBC Sports Philadelphia Plus (NBCSP+), is a full-time channel that also serves as an overflow network in case two local games are scheduled to air simultaneously on NBC Sports Philadelphia. The network was previously known as the Comcast Network.

== Availability ==
=== Peacock ===
Beginning in 2025, NBC Sports Philadelphia has been available via sister streaming service Peacock as an add-on feature.

=== Satellite carriage controversy ===
Unlike most other cable networks, NBC Sports Philadelphia is distributed only via microwave and fiber optic relays. Comcast inherited the terrestrial infrastructure that it uses to transmit the network from PRISM at the time that network shut down. Since NBC Sports Philadelphia did not uplink its signal to any communications satellites, Comcast was able to avoid a regulation outlined by the Federal Communications Commission (FCC) that requires most television channels to be offered to direct broadcast satellite providers; this loophole, known as the "terrestrial exception", was implemented by the FCC in 1992 to encourage investments in local programming by cable providers. As a result of its limited availability, satellite providers DirecTV, Dish Network and the now-defunct PrimeStar experienced a far slower rate of subscriber penetration into the Philadelphia market compared to other American cities. Craig Moffett, a senior analyst with Sanford C. Bernstein & Co. L.L.C., estimated the number of potential customers lost due to the loophole at 450,000.

This issue resulted in DirecTV filing an FCC complaint against Comcast on September 23, 1997, claiming that it used unfair monopolistic control to keep CSN Philadelphia from being made available via satellite (in contrast, DirecTV had carried SportsChannel Philadelphia prior to its shutdown). Three days later on September 26, Comcast spokesperson Joe Waz issued a statement defending the move, stating that it was "about competition" and that Comcast SportsNet could help cable television "distinguish itself from satellite rivals." Waz also accused DirecTV of unfairness in wanting to "profit" from carrying the channel despite having "invested zero in improving the quality of programming available to greater Philadelphia".

On January 20, 2010, the FCC Board of Commissioners voted 4–1 to close the "terrestrial exception" loophole. Lawyers for DirecTV and Dish Network had attempted to show that Comcast, the dominant cable provider in the Philadelphia market, acted in restraint of trade by not uplinking Comcast SportsNet Philadelphia to satellite. Comcast did not appeal the decision, allowing DirecTV and Dish to immediately enter into carriage negotiations to add the network. Both providers formally asked permission from Comcast to carry CSN Philadelphia on June 25, 2010. One month later on July 28, it was reported that Comcast had entered into discussions with DirecTV and Dish Network for carriage of CSN Philadelphia. Two days later, after accusing Comcast of refusing to negotiate in good faith, Dish Network stated it would file a complaint with the FCC. The United States Court of Appeals for the District of Columbia upheld the FCC's original ruling on June 10, 2011. Despite this ruling, Comcast has yet to offer CSN Philadelphia on competing satellite providers. Partly due to this, satellite penetration remains far lower in Philadelphia than in other major cities.

=== Cable ===
Cable providers other than Comcast within NBC Sports Philadelphia's designated market territory do have access to the network. However, on December 4, 2006, Comcast reached a deal with Verizon FiOS to carry CSN Philadelphia on its systems in eastern Pennsylvania, Delaware and southern New Jersey.

In 1998, Comcast SportsNet Philadelphia almost became available in Comcast's New York City service area on systems in southern Middlesex County (in the municipalities of Plainsboro, South Brunswick, Monroe, Cranbury, Jamesburg, Helmetta, Spotswood and East Brunswick), as a replacement for PRISM. However, days before it was set to be added, the NBA issued a cease and desist order against Comcast, blocking the distribution of Philadelphia 76ers games in Middlesex County; this was despite the fact that the league allowed New York Knicks and New Jersey Nets games televised by MSG Network and Fox Sports New York to be shown on both Comcast and TKR (now Cablevision) in Mercer County, which is part of the Philadelphia market. Comcast opted not to carry CSN Philadelphia, unwilling to distribute the network if it had to black out 76ers game telecasts. Despite this, NBC Sports Philadelphia is carried by Comcast Xfinity and Verizon FiOS in Ocean County (within their New York service areas), Cablevision in Monmouth County (within its Allentown service area), Comcast in Lambertville and by Service Electric in Phillipsburg, New Jersey.

=== MLB Extra Innings ===
Phillies games were previously unavailable through MLB Extra Innings on major satellite providers. MLB Extra Innings began transmitting the CSN Philadelphia feed for some games beginning in 2007 on both cable and satellite; the out-of-market sports package began showing both feeds of most games in 2008, at which time all of Comcast SportsNet Philadelphia's Phillies telecasts became available to all subscribers. In 2010, Phillies telecasts produced by CSN Philadelphia for MyNetworkTV affiliate WPHL-TV (channel 17) were also broadcast on Extra Innings. Due to blackout restrictions imposed by Major League Baseball, residents within the Philadelphia area, the eastern half of Pennsylvania and most of New Jersey and Delaware cannot view these games via the MLB Extra Innings package.

=== Highlight packages ===
Because of the network's distribution exclusively in the Philadelphia area, ESPN must reach agreements with ABC owned-and-operated station WPVI-TV (channel 6) – owned by ESPN's majority owner The Walt Disney Company – to provide the network recordings of any sporting events involving teams whose game broadcasts are shown on NBC Sports Philadelphia to include in highlight packages seen on Sportscenter, NBA Fastbreak and Baseball Tonight. These highlight excerpts were originally distributed in 480i standard definition until 2012, when CSN began distributing to ESPN (via WPVI) in 720p high definition.

As a consequence, national sports broadcasts have typically chosen to broadcast clips from the HD "away" feed and avoid the CSN "home" Philadelphia broadcast feed. However, MLB Network (which also has operational control of NHL Network) and NBA TV have full access to NBC Sports Philadelphia's HD feed since, as the rights holder, the network must provide full-quality video to the properties of each league for their internet and cable operations, while Comcast provides full high-definition access to NBC Sports Philadelphia to NHL Network, which carries NHL games nationwide.
