= Al Morganti =

American journalist

- Born: May 28, 1953 (age 73); Boston, Massachusetts, U.S.
- Occupations: Journalist; Television personality Sports radio personality
- Known for: The Philadelphia Inquirer; 94.1 WIP; ESPN; NBC Sports Philadelphia
- Spouse: Carol
- Children: 1
- Awards: Elmer Ferguson Memorial Award

A. "Al" Morganti (born May 28, 1953) is an American journalist, who has covered the National Hockey League (NHL) and international competitions. He is currently a pre-and post-game analyst for the Philadelphia Flyers of the NHL for games broadcast on NBC Sports Philadelphia. He is also a radio personality for 94.1 WIP in Philadelphia.

== Early life and education ==
Originally from Boston, Morganti grew up as a fan of the Boston Bruins. He did not intend to work in journalism until his later years in college. He graduated from the Boston University College of Communication in 1978 with a bachelor's of science. While in college, Morganti started his journalism career writing for The Boston Globe covering high school and college hockey.

== Journalism career ==
=== Early career ===
Morganti's first full-time job in sports journalism came with the Ft. Lauderdale News where he covered the Miami Dolphins. Having a love for hockey, Morganti then joined The Atlanta Constitution in 1979 as a hockey beat writer covering the Atlanta Flames. After five months at The Atlanta Constitution, Morganti served as the Flyers beat writer for The Philadelphia Inquirer from 1979 to 1989. In 1988, Morganti joined The Hockey News as a writer and also wrote a column in the Daily Local News three days a week.

=== Radio career at WIP ===
From 1993 until 2023, Morganti was a sports radio personality for the 94.1 WIP Morning Show in Philadelphia along with co-hosts Angelo Cataldi, Rhea Hughes, and fellow Flyers broadcast crew member Keith Jones. Following Cataldi's retirement, Morganti took a new role at WIP on the weekends.

=== Television ===
In 1990, Morganti was part of The Great Sports Debate on PRISM. Morganti was part of a panel featuring Cataldi, Glen Macnow, Jayson Stark and later Mike Missanelli. Morganti's dog, Fenway, was also a popular part of the show.

Morganti then served as an NHL analyst for ESPN/ABC from 1993 to 2005 where he worked alongside other analysts including Barry Melrose and Jim Schoenfeld and studio host John Saunders. Following his time at ESPN, Morganti accepted a position as a pre-and post-game analyst for Philadelphia Flyers games on Comcast SportsNet.

=== Recognition ===
In 2022, Morganti and Bill Clement were inducted into the Hockey Hall of Fame together, with Morganti getting the Elmer Ferguson Memorial Award for his excellence in hockey journalism career while Clement got the Foster Hewitt Memorial Award for outstanding contributions as a hockey broadcaster.
