= Ron Burke (sportscaster) =

American journalist (born 1963)

Ronald A. Burke (born September 27, 1963) is an American news and sports anchor/reporter/host. He has worked for Comcast SportsNet Philadelphia, NBA TV, and WPBF-TV (West Palm Beach, FL). He also anchored and reported sports news at WBIS-TV (New York, NY), WTVR-TV (Richmond, VA) and WHSV-TV (Harrisonburg, VA). In January 2021, Burke left WPBF to anchor news and sports for KOAT-TV in Albuquerque, NM.

== WPBF-TV ==
Prior to 2018, Burke worked exclusively in sports. He made a transition to news that year when he joined WPBF TV, the ABC affiliate in West Palm Beach, Florida, as weekend morning anchor and weekday reporter.
