= Tom Brookshier =

American football player, coach and sportscaster (1931–2010)

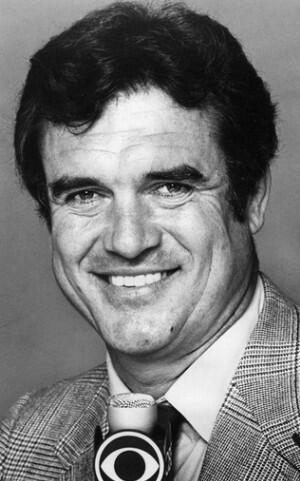
- Brookshier in 1979

No. 45, 40
- Position: Cornerback

Personal information
- Born: December 16, 1931; Roswell, New Mexico, U.S.
- Died: January 29, 2010 (aged 78); Wynnewood, Pennsylvania, U.S.
- Listed height: 6 ft 0 in (1.83 m)
- Listed weight: 196 lb (89 kg)

Career information
- High school: Roswell
- College: Colorado (1950–1952)
- NFL draft: 1953: 10th round, 177th overall pick

Career history

Playing
- Philadelphia Eagles (1953; 1956–1961)

Coaching
- Air Force (1955) Backfield coach

Awards and highlights
- NFL champion (1960); First-team All-Pro (1960); Second-team All-Pro (1959); 2× Pro Bowl (1959, 1960); Philadelphia Eagles Hall of Fame; Philadelphia Eagles No. 40 retired; First-team All-Big Seven (1951); Second-team All-Big Seven (1952)

Career NFL statistics
- Interceptions: 20
- Interception yards: 193
- Fumble recoveries: 8
- Military career
- Allegiance: United States
- Branch: United States Air Force
- Service years: c. 1954–1956
- Rank: Lieutenant
- Unit: USAFA
- Conflicts: Cold War
- Stats at Pro Football Reference

Thomas Jefferson Brookshier (/ˈbrʊkˌʃaɪər/; December 16, 1931 – January 29, 2010) was an American football player, coach, and sportscaster. He played as a cornerback with the Philadelphia Eagles of the National Football League (NFL) for seven seasons, from 1953 to 1961. He later paired with Pat Summerall on the primary broadcast team for NFL games on CBS during the 1970s.

== Early life ==
Born and raised in Roswell, New Mexico, Brookshier graduated from Roswell High School in 1949. At RHS, he received all-state honors in football, basketball, and baseball.

As a three-year letterman in football at the University of Colorado (1950–52), he was a defensive back, fullback, and return specialist. One of his gridiron teammates was astronaut Jack Swigert, a crew member of the ill-fated Apollo 13 mission in 1970, and a congressman-elect in 1982.

Brookshier was also a relief pitcher on the CU baseball team, and played one season of minor league baseball in 1954 for the Roswell Rockets of the class-D Longhorn League.

== NFL career ==
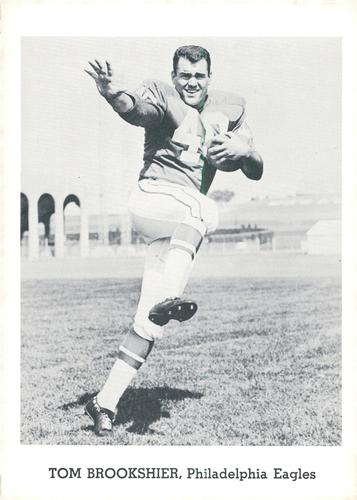
Brookshier c. 1960

A tenth-round selection (117th overall) in the 1953 NFL draft, Brookshier played defensive back for the Philadelphia Eagles of the National Football League from 1953 to 1961, missing both the 1954 and 1955 seasons to serve in the United States Air Force. A starter on the Eagles' NFL Championship team in 1960, he was selected for the Pro Bowl twice.

At age 29, Brookshier's playing career ended midway through the 1961 season; he sustained a compound fracture of his right leg while making a tackle on Willie Galimore in the 16–14 victory over the Chicago Bears at Franklin Field on November 5. He was a member of the Eagles' Honor Roll and was one of only eight players whose numbers were retired by the team; Brookshier's number was 40.

As a lieutenant, he was a backfield coach at the U.S. Air Force Academy for a season in 1955.

== Broadcasting career ==
Brookshier began sportscasting for WCAU-AM-FM-TV in Philadelphia in 1962, and became the station's sports director the following year. He joined CBS in 1965 as a color commentator for Eagles telecasts, and continued to call regional action after the network moved away from dedicated team announcers in 1968.

In the early 1970s, Brookshier and Summerall co-hosted This Week in Pro Football, a weekly syndicated highlights show produced by NFL Films. After CBS dismissed its main pro football voice Ray Scott in 1974, the network went against its standard practice of using a professional announcer for play-by-play by promoting Summerall as play by play and partnering him with Brookshier as analyst. The two former NFL players became arguably U.S. television's most popular sports broadcasting team for the remainder of the decade. Describing the pair's on-air rapport, Summerall said, "With Brookie, it was more of a conversation, like two guys in a saloon." CBS, however, eventually found that their pairing exacerbated each of their respective issues with alcohol (Summerall admitted later that they would do heavy drinking the night before games) and desired more excitement in the booth, as their call of Super Bowl XIV had received mixed reviews. As such, when John Madden soon became an in-demand voice to utilize in broadcasting for CBS, they decided quickly to find a play-by-play voice to pair him with. To Summerall's chagrin, they paired him with Madden for select broadcasts starting in 1981. The result was deemed successful to maintain the two as the lead pair for CBS broadcasts for the decade to come. Besides many regular-season and playoff contests, most of which involved the Dallas Cowboys who were the National Football Conference's most dominant franchise at the time, the duo had called Super Bowls X, XII, and XIV. Brookshier also worked pre-game and post-game shows for four other Super Bowls. He and Summerall also appeared as themselves in the 1977 motion picture Black Sunday, which was partially filmed at Super Bowl X, located at the Miami Orange Bowl.

In 1976, Brookshier and Summerall called a heavyweight title fight between Muhammad Ali and Jean Pierre Coopman live in prime time from Puerto Rico on Friday, February 20. Brent Musburger and Phyllis George of The NFL Today co-hosted the telecast that night. Meanwhile, Don Dunphy supplied some commentary between rounds. A month earlier, CBS assigned Summerall and Brookshier to announce a Ken Norton bout against Pedro Lovell, a mere eight days before they called Super Bowl X.

Retired Oakland Raiders head coach John Madden joined CBS as a color analyst in 1979; when he was paired with Summerall on the primary broadcast team in 1981, Brookshier switched to calling play-by-play.

=== Controversy ===
Brookshier became the subject of controversy because of a remark he made in 1983 during an NFL broadcast of an Eagles–Saints game on December 11. After a program note for an upcoming telecast of an NCAA men's basketball game between defending national champion North Carolina State and Louisville, Brookshier said that the Louisville players had "a collective I.Q. of about forty, but they can play basketball." Given a chance to walk back the statement by partner Charlie Waters, Brookshier doubled down, saying "it's the truth."

This resulted in Neal Pilson, then president of CBS Sports, apologizing to Louisville school officials and later suspending Brookshier for the last weekend of the NFL regular season. Louisville's athletic director, Bill Olsen, felt that the remark was racist, since Louisville's starting five were all African American. Brookshier later apologized, calling his remark "stupid" and "dumb", but was angered over CBS's reaction, saying "I'm not about to be judged on one comment." He added, "I've done a lot of things for charity. Now my own network is bailing out on me and taking me off the air. After 20 years at CBS, I deserve better than this." The apology was accepted by the university and university president Donald Swain invited Brookshier to be the featured speaker at the school's annual football kickoff luncheon in Clarksville, Indiana on August 2, 1984. Brookshier was reinstated in CBS's announcing lineup for the 1984 season, continuing as a network commentator through 1986.

== Later life ==
Brookshier was a partner in the 1987 purchase of radio station WIP (610 AM) by Spectacor in 1987, serving as executive vice president and director of sports operations. In 1989, he hosted WIP's morning show; the program was called Breakfast with Brookshier before he was paired with Angelo Cataldi and the program re-dubbed Brookie and the Rookie, and then finally simply Brookshier and Cataldi. He left broadcasting and was last known to be working as a consultant for real estate broker CB Richard Ellis.

Brookshier died of cancer at Lankenau Medical Center on January 29, 2010. The Broadcast Pioneers of Philadelphia inducted Brookshier into their Hall of Fame in 2007.

Sporting positions
Preceded by Pat Summerall	NFL on CBS lead game analyst 1974–1981	Succeeded by John Madden
