= Mike Missanelli =

American journalist

- Born: November 11, 1955 (age 71); Bristol, Pennsylvania, U.S.
- Education: Pennsylvania State University; Widener University Delaware Law School
- Occupation: Sports radio personality

Mike Missanelli is an American sports radio personality, who most recently served as the afternoon host for ESPN affiliate, 97.5 The Fanatic in Philadelphia. He previously served as a sports journalist for The Philadelphia Inquirer and a sports radio personality for 610 WIP.

== Early life ==
Missanelli was born and raised in Bristol, Pennsylvania. He attended Pennsylvania State University where he played college baseball as a second baseman for the Penn State Nittany Lions. He graduated from Penn State in 1977 and in 1986 graduated from Widener University Delaware Law School.

== Career ==
=== WIP ===
Missanelli started his career working as a writer for The Philadelphia Inquirer. He eventually moved over to radio working on-air at 610 WIP. During his tenure at WIP, Missanelli was engaged in controversy after criticizing Philadelphia Eagles kicker David Akers during an interview. Missanelli called Akers a "girl" and criticized him for not being "a real athlete" and referred to him as "just a kicker". He was fired from 610 WIP in 2006 after an altercation with an on-site producer in which it was alleged that he hit the producer. Missanelli then began a show with comedian Joe Conklin on 93.3 WMMR.

=== 97.5 The Fanatic ===
In January 2010, he signed a multi-year deal at ESPN affiliate, 97.5 The Fanatic, to host their midday show.

In 2016, it was revealed that a longtime caller by the name "Dwayne from Swedesboro" was actually a character created by his producer. Missanelli apologized for having a fake caller and for the racial stereotypes of the character, but he denied having knowledge that the caller was fake.

Starting in 2018, the show began being simulcasted on NBC Sports Philadelphia.

In May 2020, while on the air, Missanelli got into a heated debate with producer Tyrone Johnson and sports update anchor Natalie Egenolf, about an incident in Central Park where a white woman called the police on a black man, who was birdwatching. Right before cutting to commercial, Missanelli could be seen throwing his headset in anger. When the show came back onto television, Missanelli and Johnson could be seen yelling at one another and Missanelli appeared to be cursing at Johnson.

In January 2022, Missanelli gave an interview where he said he has no plans to retire. On May 31, 2022, Missanelli announced on air that it would be his last show. Missanelli's contract was set to expire and 97.5 The Fanatic opted to go in a different direction.

=== The Mike Missanelli Podcast ===
In September 2022, Missanelli announced that he had joined the Chicago-based gaming company Rush Street Interactive to represent its brand Bet Rivers Network. Missanelli has a biweekly podcast on Philadelphia sports that is distributed via multiple outlets.

=== TV work ===
In addition to his work on the radio, Missanelli joined PHL 17 in 2000 where he worked as sports director and anchor. He left the station in 2003 when his contract expired.

Missanelli was fired in 2017 from a weekly gig he had on 6 ABC after he made he said it was "unnatural" for a female broadcaster to call an NFL game.

Starting in 2022, Missanelli began serving as a panelist on the Jakib Sports Pond Lehocky Postgame Show that is broadcast live from the Ocean Casino Resort and show on 6ABC.

=== Personality ===
Missanelli has repeatedly battled the negative perception that exists surrounding Philadelphia sports. Missanelli has written, "Let me assure that when I tear into a guest, like Michael Wilbon or a Skip Bayless or a Keith Law, it’s for a good reason that has absolutely nothing to do with me personally and everything to do with having the backs of the people, who have had to tread the filthy water of Philly fan perception, fostered by lazy national media nitwits, way too long."

== Other ventures ==
Missanelli has worked as a professor at Saint Joseph's University.

In June 2021, Missanelli launched his first off-air business entity, MikeMiss Ventures, that focuses on his interests outside of sports radio. Missanelli also launched "MikeMiss: The EveryDay Cook" show, based on his longtime passion for food and cooking and started "Behind the Mic", in which he evaluates aspiring broadcasters reels and provides feedback in a one-on-one call session and offers "MeetMike", a virtual meet and greet. In 2022, he released a children's book called "Shima the Shiba", which he details the human-like behavior of his Shiba Inu dog and how the dog can lay down valuable lessons in life for young children.

In September 2023, Missanelli launched a weekly sports video blog called "Mike Speaks". Released every Friday on YouTube, Missanelli wraps up the week with insights and analysis of sports and life. Segments include: SOUND OFF (Listeners e-mail their thoughts of the week with Missanelli responding); QUIRKY STORY OF THE WEEK (Missanelli riffs off something unusual that happened during the week); WHAT'S BUGGIN MIKE (Missanelli talks about something that really bugs him); LOCAL SPORTS SPOTLIGHT (Missanelli scans the region for a local sports standout story of the week - viewers also send in nominations). Missanelli also offers one-on-one video chats with fans called, Take 5 with Mike. Viewers will be able to speak with Mike about selected subjects including sports, broadcasting, wine - among other subjects.

== Personal life ==
On April 8, 2026, Missanelli was arrested on charges of simple assault and harassment after allegedly slapping his fiancé on the head during an argument.
