= Neil Hartman =

American sports television personality

Neil Hartman is Senior Director for the Center for Sports Communication and Social Impact at Rowan University and camp director at Play By Play Sports Broadcasting Camps. He was previously a longtime sports personality and was the primetime anchor for Comcast SportsNet Philadelphia since its inception in 1997. On April 28, 2016, Hartman announced he was leaving Comcast SportsNet. Hartman's career spans over 35 years. Before joining CSN, Hartman was sports anchor and reporter for KYW-TV as well as WPHL-TV.

Hartman is best known for instigating Allen Iverson's famous "Practice" rant in May 2002

== Awards ==
He received four Mid-Atlantic Emmy Awards and the Philadelphia Magazine "Best of Philly" Sports Talk Show Award while working for 1210 AM. Hartman was honored by the National Sportscasters and Sportswriters Association as the state's Sportscaster of the Year in 2000.
