= Angelo Cataldi =

American sports radio personality

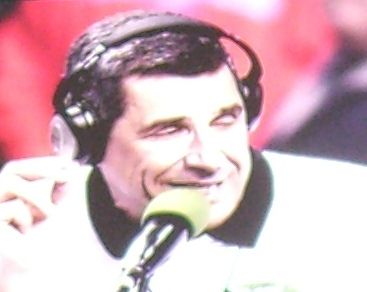
- Cataldi in 2007
- Born: Angelo Anthony Cataldi Jr. March 13, 1951 (age 75); Providence, Rhode Island, U.S.
- Education: University of Rhode Island (BA); Columbia University (MS)
- Occupations: Journalist; Radio host
- Known for: The Philadelphia Inquirer; WIP Morning Show host
- Notable work: Wing Bowl

Angelo Anthony Cataldi Jr. (born March 13, 1951) is an American retired sports radio personality for 94.1 WIP in Philadelphia. Cataldi began his career as a sports journalist for The Philadelphia Inquirer. From 1989 until 2023 he hosted The WIP Morning Show. During Cataldi's tenure the show became one of the most popular shows in Philadelphia radio history. Philadelphia Magazine describes Cataldi as having "done more than anyone to shape how we talk about — and even think about — sports" in Philadelphia.

== Early life ==
Cataldi was born in Providence, Rhode Island on March 13, 1951. He grew up a fan of the New York Yankees. Cataldi graduated from the University of Rhode Island in 1972 with a bachelor's degree in journalism and Columbia University in 1977 with a master's degree in journalism.

== Career ==
Cataldi began his career in 1975 as the news editor for the Narragansett Times. He joined his hometown paper the Providence Journal as their general assignments reporter in 1977. Cataldi is one of only two journalists to have covered the longest professional baseball game, between the Pawtucket Red Sox and the Rochester Red Wings in 1981.

=== The Philadelphia Inquirer ===
Cataldi moved to Philadelphia in 1983 after receiving an offer to be a sports journalist for The Philadelphia Inquirer. During his time at The Inquirer, Cataldi was a finalist for the Pulitzer Prize for his coverage of the 1986 Eagles and their new head coach Buddy Ryan. Cataldi's coverage of the 1986 season revealed that Ryan failed to fulfill many of the promises he had made prior to the season - such as guaranteeing the Eagles would go undefeated against other teams in the NFC East. Following the article being published, Ryan seldom called on Cataldi to answer his questions during press conferences.

At The Inquirer he wrote investigation pieces on fixed horse races and corruption in the sports memorabilia industry. Cataldi wrote a story about how doctor's medical evaluations are undermined by working for sports team, but the story's lede was heavily changed without his permission. This decision by The Inquirer contributed to his decision to move to sports radio.

=== WIP Morning Show ===
Cataldi had a job offer to be a writer for The Los Angeles Times, but he opted to join WIP because the pay was better. Cataldi's first work on radio came in 1988 as a part-time weekday host during the station's 9:00 AM to 10:00 AM hours. At first, Cataldi provided just sports analysis, but his producer told him "stop pontificating and start entertaining. This is not journalism." In 1988, Cataldi joined WIP's morning show with Tom Brookshier. The show was initially titled Brookie and the Rookie before later being renamed Brookshire and Cataldi. Cataldi became the host of the WIP Morning Show in 1993 along with Al Morganti. The show was an instant hit and dominated particularly in ratings among men aged 25 to 54. Rhea Hughes joined as another co-host in 1997 and Keith Jones joined as a co-host in 2002. Beginning in 2003, the WIP Morning Show began broadcasting from the Borgata in Atlantic City every Friday. For 25 years, the WIP Morning Show was broadcast the day before Thanksgiving from the Philadelphia International Airport.

During his tenure as WIP's morning host, Cataldi has been known for both his vocal praise and criticism of Philadelphia's sports teams, coaches, players and fans. In April 1999, Cataldi, along with then-Philadelphia Mayor Ed Rendell, organized a group of Eagles fans - known as the Dirty 30 - to travel to the NFL Draft in New York City where the Eagles had the second pick. The "Dirty 30" were told to cheer if the Eagles drafted running back Ricky Williams, but instead the team drafted quarterback Donovan McNabb, who was greeted with a chorus of boos when he appeared on stage. Cataldi has stated that the boos were not directed at McNabb, but at the Eagle's organization, who passed on drafting Williams. Cataldi has also had feuds with a number of coaches in Philadelphia particularly Andy Reid and Gabe Kapler, as well as former Eagles owner Norman Braman and former Eagles President Joe Banner. Cataldi once challenged former Philadelphia Phillies manager Charlie Manuel to a fist fight.

Cataldi is known for interjecting a large entertainment component into the WIP Morning Show including pop culture mentions and comedy bits. In 1993, the WIP Morning Show founded the Wing Bowl, an annual eating contest, held on the Friday before the Super Bowl, because the Eagles were historically almost never in the game. The Wing Bowl turned into a spectacle attracting more than 20,000 people and from 2000 to 2018 was held at the Wells Fargo Center. The Wing Bowl was ended following the Eagle's victory in Super Bowl LII, which was the franchise's first Super Bowl victory.

Despite generally being seen as a critic of Philadelphia athletes, Cataldi has held events in support of players. In 1992, Cataldi organized an event known as "Honk for Herschel" encouraging Eagles fans to gather at Veterans Stadium and honk their car in support of signing free agent running back Herschel Walker. In 1993, Cataldi organized a 2,000 person event known as "Rally for Reggie" to encourage Reggie White to re-sign with the Eagles. In July 2008, Cataldi launched a campaign to get Phillies' outfielder Pat Burrell into the 2008 MLB All-Star Game. Despite organizing an event where pre-selected fans spent more than 50 hours voting for Pat Burrell at Citizens Bank Park, Burrell was not named to the team.

During his tenure on the air, Cataldi has frequently received calls from Philadelphia politicians including former Pennsylvania Governor Ed Rendell, the late U.S. Senator Arlen Specter, former U.S. Congressman Patrick Murphy and former City Councilman Al Taubenberger. When then-Senator Barack Obama was running for president in 2008, he called into Cataldi's show twice to try and win over Pennsylvania voters in the presidential primary.

The WIP Morning Show is also known for having a number of frequent and engaged callers including Kenny from the Dirty 30, Butch from Manayunk and Eagles Shirley.

Cataldi has been praised for his strong stance against athletes accused of domestic violence including Brett Myers and Odubel Herrera. He suggested that fans protest outside of Citizens Bank Park to call on the Phillies to release Herrera, who was arrested on charges of domestic violence.

Cataldi co-authored The Great Philadelphia Sports Debate with fellow WIP host Glen Macnow in 2004. The Broadcast Pioneers of Philadelphia inducted Cataldi into their Hall of Fame in 2012. That same year, Cataldi was a finalist for the National Association of Broadcasters' Major Market Personality award.

On October 6, 2021, at 8:00 AM, Angelo Cataldi announced that he would retire from WIP radio following the conclusion of the 2022 Philadelphia Eagles season. In his final year on the air, the Phillies made the World Series and the Eagles made Super Bowl LVII. Catladi's final show occurred on February 17, 2023 and featured special guests including former Pennsylvania Governor Ed Rendell and video messages from legendary Philadelphia sports figures including Eagles general manager Howie Roseman, former Eagle's coaches Doug Pederson and Andy Reid, former Phillie's manager Charlie Manuel and former Villanova men's basketball coach Jay Wright.

At 10:00 AM, Cataldi signed off one final time saying "I mocked every athlete who said this when they retire, and I’m going to close by saying it myself — it’s time for me to go, Philadelphia. I need to spend more time with my family. Thank you all for an amazing run. Goodbye."

=== The Great Sports Debate ===
Cataldi served as a personality for The Great Sports Debate, a sports debate show on PRISM. Cataldi was part of a panel featuring Jayson Stark, Al Morganti, Glen Macnow and later Mike Missanelli. The show ran from 1990 to 1997 and is credited for being one of the first sports debate shows on television. One of Cataldi's most notable moments on the show was his live reaction to the not guilty verdict in the murder trial of O. J. Simpson. Cataldi, who believed Simpson was guilty, responded in outrage referring to the verdict as an "outrage" and "a disgrace." Another memorable moment came when Phillies' pitcher Curt Schilling appeared on the show to confront Cataldi, who was a vocal critic of Schilling.

== Personal life ==
Cataldi currently resides in Chestnut Hill, Philadelphia and also owns a home in Sea Isle City, New Jersey. He previously lived in Medford, New Jersey.

In August 1999, Cataldi was arrested and fined $82 for not having a beach tag at the beach in Avalon, New Jersey. Cataldi then proceeded to work with state legislator Neil M. Cohen to challenge the legality of beach tags.

During the 2004 U.S. presidential election, Cataldi ripped President George W. Bush as a "bully" for his stance favoring restriction of freedom of speech on radio and television, and Senator John Kerry as a "phony" for questionable financial dealings, and wrote Ed Rendell's name in for president.

Cataldi is a collector of 1950s memorabilia.

Cataldi wrote a memoir about his career on radio Loud. He co-hosts a podcast discussing television called The TV Show with longtime WIP co-host Rhea Hughes and comedian Jay Black.
