= Black Economic Alliance =

American nonprofit organization and PAC

- Formation: 2018
- Headquarters: Washington, DC
- Co-Chair: Tony Coles
- Co-Chair: Charles Phillips
- CEO: Samantha Tweedy
- Website: https://blackeconomicalliance.org

The Black Economic Alliance (BEA) is an American nonpartisan coalition of Black business leaders and allies established in 2018. Through the BEA Political Action Committee (PAC), it supports candidates advancing Black economic progress and prosperity. While not formally aligned with either the Democratic or Republican political party, it has endorsed many Democratic candidates since it was first launched. Through the nonprofit BEA Foundation, it sponsors research and programs that advance the BEA's economic policy agenda focused on work, wages, and wealth for the Black community.

BEA is led by co-founders and co-chairs Charles Phillips and Tony Coles. Phillips is a technology executive and Coles is a biotechnology executive. The CEO of the Black Economic Alliance is Samantha Tweedy.

== Programs and activities ==
=== Presidential forum and economic policies ===
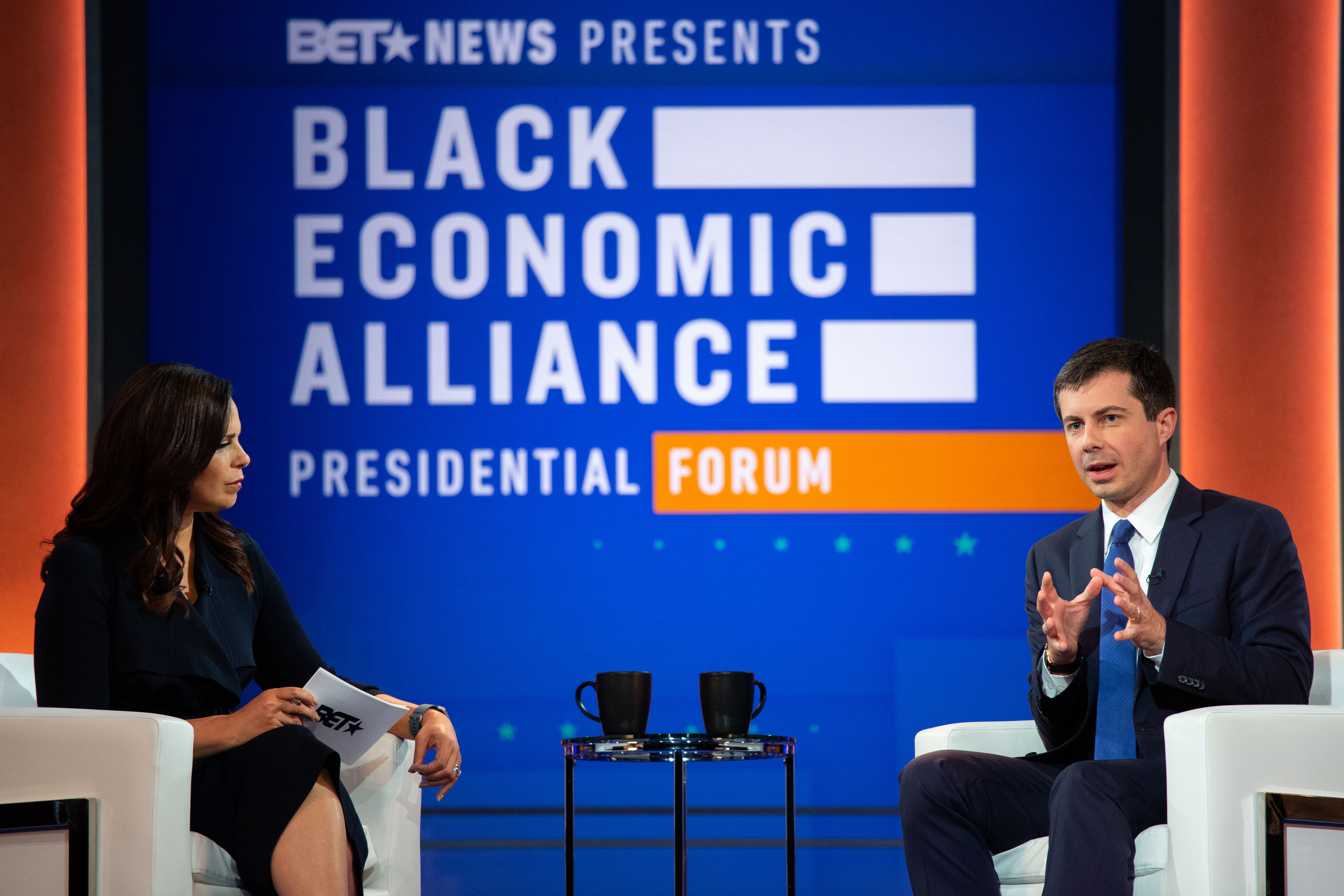
Pete Buttigieg at the BEA Presidential Forum

In June 2019, the organization hosted the BEA Presidential Forum in Charleston, South Carolina, ahead of the state's Democratic convention. Four presidential candidates including former Congressman Beto O'Rourke, Senator Cory Booker, Senator Elizabeth Warren, and Mayor Pete Buttigieg were interviewed on stage by journalist Soledad O'Brien. During the forum, which was later broadcast by BET, each candidate promised to work to close the wealth gap between black and white Americans.

Prior to the forum, the BEA released the results of a nationwide poll of Black Americans conducted by Hart Research and Brossard Research, which it commissioned. Respondents were given a list of 14 economic policies and asked how much they thought each would help the Black community. While the majority of Black Americans supported each of the 14 proposed policies, the highest rated included a higher minimum wage, stronger anti-discrimination laws, and better workplace benefits and training; about 70 percent of respondents said that each of those would help "a great deal".

In August 2024, the BEA hosted a panel on economic mobility at the Democratic National Convention in Chicago.

=== Protecting voter rights ===
In 2021, after the state of Georgia enacted a new law expected to suppress Black voter turnout, BEA co-chairman Charles Phillips helped to draft an open letter signed by 72 Black business executives opposing the law and any form of voting restrictions. The BEA co-sponsored a full-page ad in The New York Times publishing the letter.

As Republican legislators in nearly every state introduced bills to restrict voting, the BEA pushed for corporate America to unequivocally support voter rights and reject attempts to restrict them nationwide. Working with local business coalitions, the BEA persuaded hundreds of companies such as Amazon, Bank of America, Best Buy, Cisco, Citigroup, Facebook, General Motors, Microsoft, and Wells Fargo to sign the statements, despite the fact that they had each donated more than $100,000 to the Republican State Leadership Committee and the Republican Governors Association.

=== Business and democracy ===
In May 2022, the Black Economic Alliance co-founded a new initiative called the Business and Democracy Initiative, with two other nonprofit organizations: Public Private Strategies and the Leadership Now Project. The three organizations also released the results of a poll of 400 business leaders, which found that three-quarters of them believed that companies should influence policies supporting democracy at the state and federal levels. The poll was conducted in the wake of the state of Florida's move to punish Disney for after the company condemned a law widely seen as anti-LGBTQ.

=== Support for entrepreneurs ===
In September 2023, the BEA Foundation announced its submission of an amicus brief in support of the Fearless Foundation, which had faced legal action instigated by Edward Blum alleging that it discriminated against non-Black women. The BEA Foundation also funded a Harris Poll which found that 78% of Americans supported businesses taking steps to ensure that their employee base reflected the diversity of the nation's population. The Fearless Fund was closed one year later following a legal settlement.

=== Voter mobilization ===
In September 2020, David Clunie, then executive director of the Black Economic Alliance, told Bloomberg.com that companies should give employees paid time off to vote before and on Election Day.

In October 2024, the Black Economic Alliance launched a voter mobilization program targeting infrequent Black voters in swing states including Georgia, Michigan, Nevada, North Carolina, and Pennsylvania.

=== Presidential election ===
In July 2024, The New York Times "DealBook" reported that the Black Economic Alliance PAC has convened a call with 250 business leaders, urging them to support Kamala Harris for President. As of July 26, the PAC had raised more than $3 million for the Democratic ticket.

== Leadership ==
In October 2017, The New York Times reported that Black business executives were planning to start a new political action committee (PAC) by early 2018. The main organizers were named as Charles Phillips, then CEO of Infocor; Tony Coles, then head of Yumanity Therapeutics; Marva Smalls, global head of inclusion strategy at Viacom; and William M. Lewis Jr, co-chairman of investment banking at Lazard.

Akunna Cook served as the founding executive director of the Black Economic Alliance from March 2018 through September 2019. In March 2020, the board of directors appointed David Clunie as executive director of the group. In August 2021, Samantha Tweedy was appointed president of the Black Economic Alliance Foundation.

== Notable board members ==
The board of directors is co-chaired by Tony Coles, chair of the board of directors of Cerevel Therapeutics, and Charles Phillips, CEO of Infor. Other notable board members include:

- Broderick Johnson, executive vice president for public policy and digital equity at Comcast
- Deval Patrick, former governor of Massachusetts
- Kneeland Youngblood, founding partner and chairman of Pharos Capital Group

Notable advisory board menbers include:

- Troy Carter, chairman and CEO of Atom Factory
- William Cohen, former Secretary of Defense and Republican Congressman
- Morgan DeBaun, founder and CEO of Blavity
- Bruce Gordon, former Verizon executive and former CEO of the NAACP
- Van Jones, CNN political contributor and host of Uncommon Ground podcast
- Ronald Kirk, former United States Trade Representative and former mayor of Dallas
- Edward Lewis, co-founder and former CEO of Essence magazine
- Heather McGee, former president of Demos
- Spencer Overton, law professor at George Washington University and former president, Joint Center for Economic Studies
- Richard Parsons, former chairman of Citigroup and Time Warner Cable
- Robert Raben, former United States Assistant Attorney General
- John W. Rogers, Jr., founder and chairman of Ariel Capital Management
- Robert E. Rubin, former United States Treasury Secretary and former co-CEO of Goldman Sachs
- Steve Schmidt, political strategist and principal at SES Strategies
- Bakari Sellers, attorney and former member of the South Carolina House of Representatives
- Michael Steele, former lieutenant governor of Maryland and former chair of the Republican National Committee

== See also ==
- Black-owned businesses
