= Rosati-Kain Academy =

Catholic school in St. Louis, Missouri, US

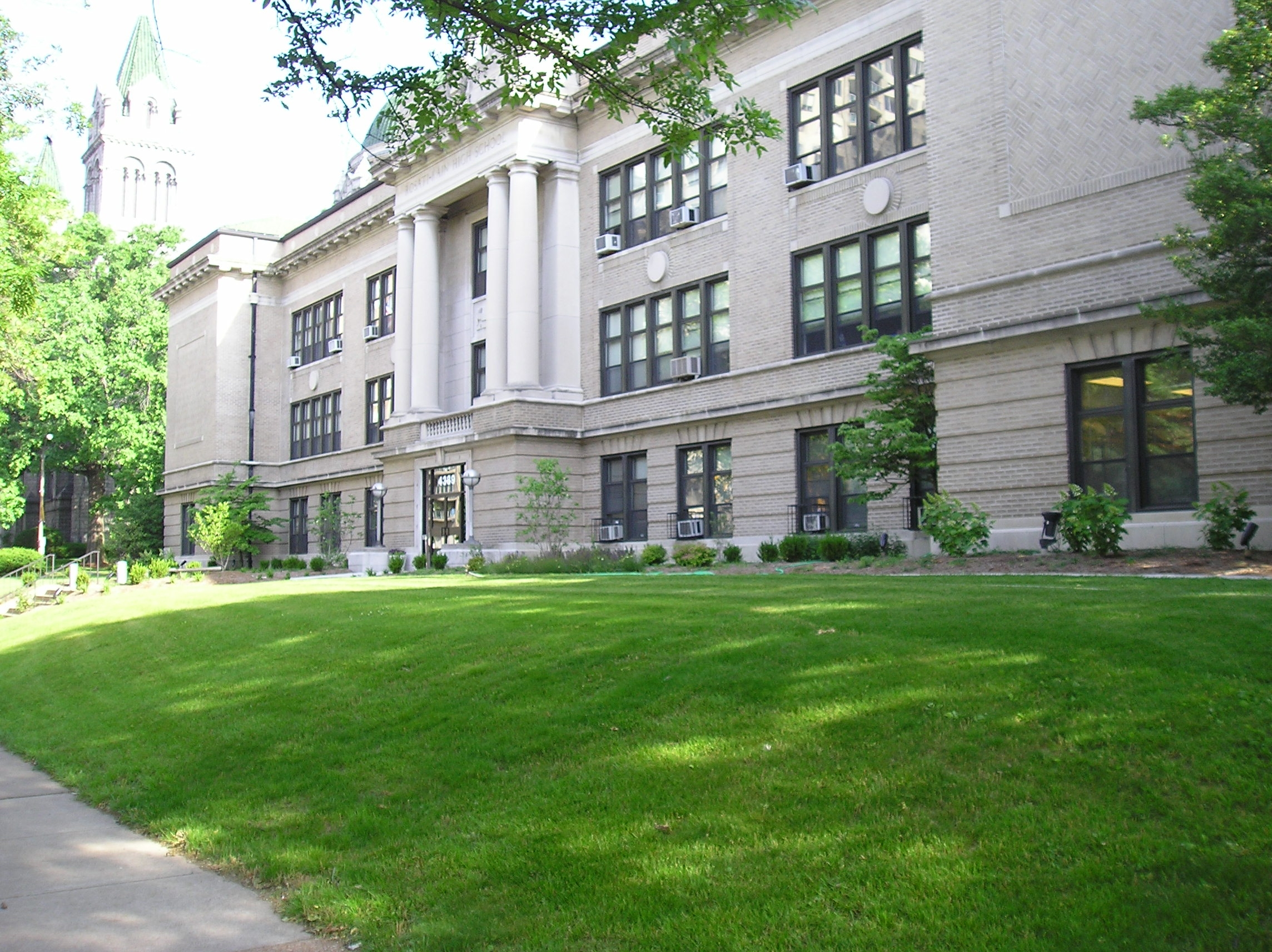

Location
- 4389 Lindell Boulevard; St. Louis, Missouri 63108; United States; 38.6420°N 90.2538°W

Information
- Former name: Rosati-Kain High School (1911–2023)
- Type: Private college-preparatory school
- Religious affiliation: Roman Catholic
- Established: 1911; 115 years ago
- Principal: Masa Massenburg-Johnson
- Faculty: 16.3 (on an FTE basis)
- Grades: 9–12
- Gender: Girls
- Enrollment: 127 (2023–24)
- Colors: Purple and gold
- Athletics conference: Archdiocesan Athletic Association
- Nickname: Kougars
- Accreditation: Cognia
- Tuition: $14,900
- Website: rosati-kain.org

Rosati-Kain Academy (formerly Rosati-Kain High School) is an all-girls Catholic college-preparatory school in St. Louis, Missouri. Located in St. Louis' historic Central West End, Rosati-Kain is just east of the Cathedral Basilica of St. Louis.

== History ==
Rosati-Kain was originally two distinct educational institutions—the Rosati Center run by the Sisters of St. Joseph of Carondelet and the Kain Center run by the School Sisters of Notre Dame. These two centers were named after the first two Archbishops of St. Louis, Joseph Rosati and John Joseph Kain. In 1911, the two centers merged to form one school—Rosati-Kain High School, the first Archdiocesan high school in the Archdiocese of St. Louis.

Between the years of 1911 and 1920, the nuns served as faculty and taught without being paid. They supported the operational expenses of the school with subsidies from their motherhouses and by selling needlework and teaching music.

By 1919, the school had outgrown its original building at the St. Vincent Seminary site at Lucas and Grand Avenues. The school moved to the Hayes Mansion at the corner of Lindell Boulevard and Newstead Avenue. In 1921, the Hayes Mansion was moved to make room to build a new larger structure designed by architect Henry P. Hess. This structure was completed in 1922 and remains the main building for present-day Rosati-Kain Academy. In 1941, the gymnasium, cafeteria, and music room were added to the property with funding raised by the Rosati-Kain Alumnae Association.

By the mid-1940s, more than 1,000 students attended Rosati-Kain in two separate shifts, one in the morning and one in the afternoon. Rosati-Kain became the first high school in the St. Louis area to integrate, enrolling five African-American students in 1947.

The 2011-12 school year marked the 100th anniversary of Rosati-Kain, and the institution held a year-long Centennial Celebration. During this time, funds were raised to renovate the 1922 building and build a 12,000 square foot addition, which was completed in 2015. A new school song was written specifically for the Centennial Celebration by faculty members Luanne Murphy and Laura Govero-Yann.

On September 28, 2022, the St. Louis Post-Dispatch reported that the Archdiocese of Saint Louis planned to close Rosati-Kain along with St. Mary's High School at the end of the 2022-2023 school year as part of the archdioceses' "All Things New Plan," which closed dozens of parishes and grade schools. In December 2022, it was announced that the school would remain open as an independent school under a new name, Rosati-Kain Academy, sponsored by St. Joseph Educational Ministries and with support from its alumnae and community. As of July 2025, Rosati-Kain signed a 25-year lease with the Archdiocese of Saint Louis to remain in its 1922 school building.

== Athletics ==
Rosati-Kain is a full member of the Missouri State High School Activities Association (MSHSAA), and its athletics teams compete as the Kougars.

== Notable alumnae ==
- Jasmine Crockett, member of the U.S. House of Representatives from Texas's 30th district
- Morgan DeBaun, founder of Blavity
- Ellen Foley, actress/singer
- Irene Hannon, author
- Ann Leckie, author
- Patricia Lockwood, poet, novelist, and essayist
- Robin Ransom, first African-American woman appointed to the Missouri Supreme Court
