= Archdiocesan Athletic Association =

High school athletic conference in St. Louis, Missouri, United States

- Conference: MSHSAA
- No. of teams: 11
- Region: Metro St. Louis

The Archdiocesan Athletic Association (AAA) was a high school athletic conference comprising private high schools located in the St. Louis metro area. Most were Catholic schools, operated by the Archdiocese of St. Louis. The conference disbanded in 2022.

== Member schools ==
The Archdiocesan Athletic Association consisted of eleven high schools. The conference was divided into two divisions, split into larger and smaller schools. The conference comprised schools in Class 3, Class 4, and Class 5 (in basketball).

School	Nickname	Colors	City	County	Type
Bishop DuBourg	Cavaliers		St. Louis		Private
Cardinal Ritter	Lions		St. Louis		Private
Duchesne	Pioneers		St. Charles	St. Charles	Private
Father Tolton	Trailblazers		Columbia	Boone	Private
Christian High School	Eagles		O'Fallon	St. Charles	Private
Lutheran St. Charles	Cougars		St. Peters	St. Charles	Private
Notre Dame	Rebels		Lemay	St. Louis County	Private (girls)
Rosati-Kain	Kougars		St. Louis		Private (girls)
St. Dominic	Crusaders		O'Fallon	St. Charles	Private
St. Francis Borgia	Knights		Washington	Franklin	Private
St. Mary's South Side	Dragons		St. Louis		Private (boys)
