= Rue107 =

American women's clothing brand

- Industry: Fashion
- Founder: Marie Jean-Baptiste
- Area served: New York City, New York
- Website: rue107.com

Rue107 is a women's clothing brand founded in 2011 by Marie Jean-Baptiste in New York City. It specializes in a wide gamut of sizes of women's clothing, though it is notable for its selection of women's plus-sized clothing and swimwear lines. Since its inception, the clothing brand has been worn by several celebrities, including Beyoncé, Nicki Minaj, and others. The clothing brand has received praise for its clothing lines as well as the attention it has given to plus-sized women in terms of marketing and clothing options. The brand has also received attention for its independent status, its plus-sized clothing options, and the fact that it was a company created by a black woman.

== History ==
Rue107 was founded by Marie Jean-Baptiste in New York City. Explaining why she decided to create the company, Baptiste stated that she “always had an entrepreneurial spirit” and that a mentor helped introduce her to stretch fabrics, which resulted in her making unique clothes. Prior to Rue107, Baptiste was a Licensed Practical Nurse, all the while planning to create her business. She incorporated her business in July 2011, and spent the year prior testing the market. Baptiste cited her reasons for offering clothing for a wide variety of sizes as being due to her upbringing in Haiti, where beauty standards for her were not defined by size. Specifically, she says that beauty is defined by how people carry themselves.

== Products and marketing ==
Rue107's clothing features a variety of styles, including its “Juicy Fruit” collection. The clothing sizes range from 2 to 24. Multiple celebrities have been seen wearing Rue107 clothing, including Amber Rose, Nicki Minaj, Beyoncé, Dawn Richard, and Christina Millan. Rue107 collaborated with plus-sized model Essie Golden and Monif C. to throw a rooftop pool party to celebrate body positivity.

== Reception ==
Plus Model writer Marcy Cruz praised the company's use of “vibrant colors and prints” from their Vitamin C catalogue, as well as praising its penchant for designs for curvy people. Bustle writer Marie Southard Ospina expressed disappointment in the blandness of both variety and boldness, noting that Rue107 stood out as an exception to this, specifically citing the company's Curve section. Fusion writer Tahirah Hairston included Rue107 in a list of “6 swimwear brands made for women with curves,” saying that the variety of swimwear options would “make Beyoncé proud.” Staff of The Curvy Fashionista called Rue107 one of their favorite brands of the summer. Orit Mohamed for Blavity included it in his list of the 11 black-owned fashion lines that people should check out. The Huffington Post's Taryn Finley similarly included Rue 107 in her list of nine great swimwear lines created by black women. The book “Fashion Divas: The Best Fashion Trends and Styles From 50+ African American Designers” included Marie Jean-Baptiste's Rue 107 in its list. Style Blazer's Marie Denee included Rue107 in a list of noteworthy independent plus-sized designers, praising its use of silhouettes and its bold style, while also calling it a cult hit among “New York trendsetters.”
