= Bill "El Wingador" Simmons =

American competitive eater

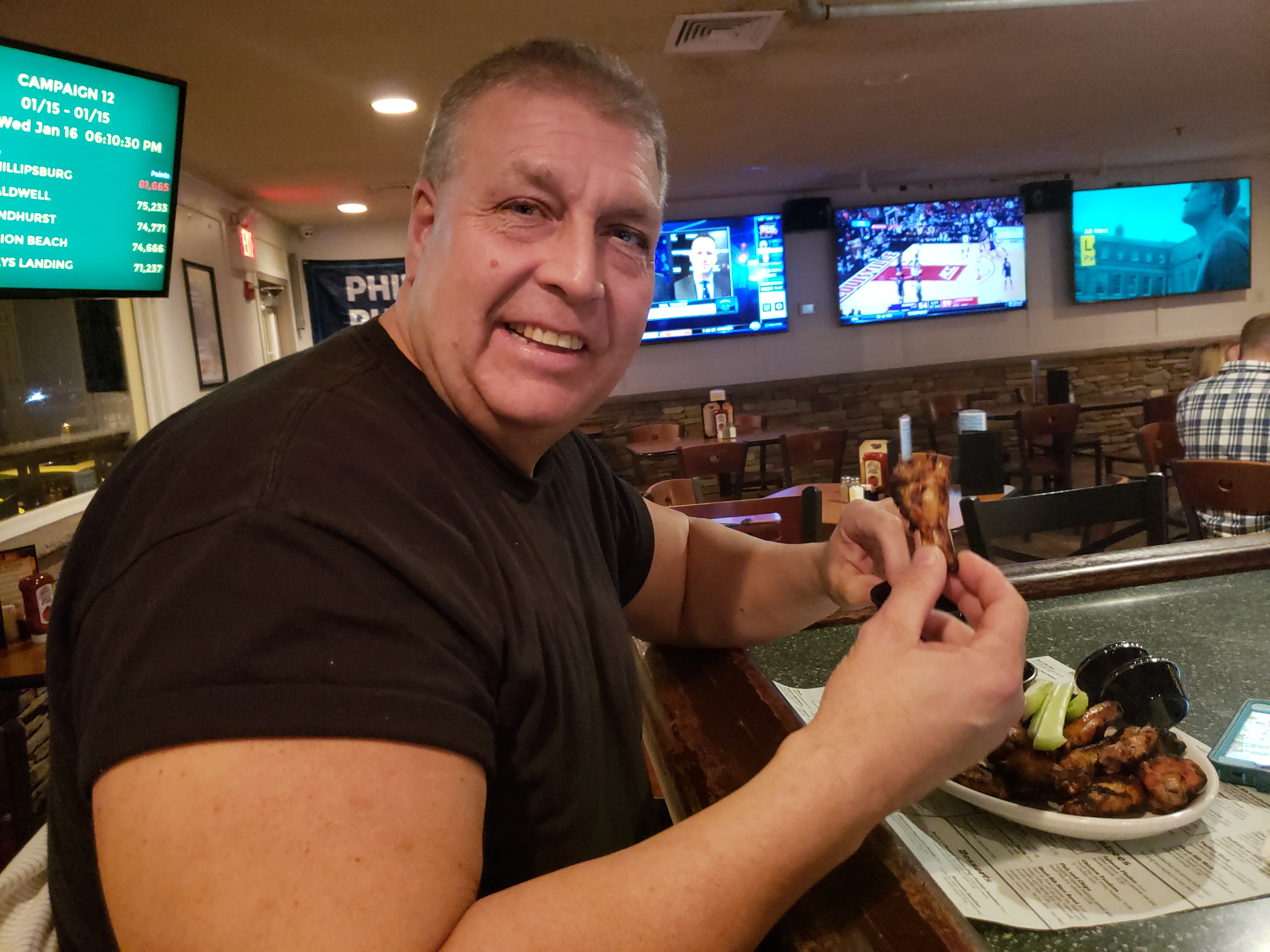
Bill "El Wingador" Simmons in 2019

William Simmons (born November 1, 1961), known as El Wingador, is a competitive eater, author, entrepreneur, speaker and former member of the International Federation of Competitive Eating (IFOCE). Simmons achieved notoriety after winning Philadelphia's Sports Radio 94 WIP's Wing Bowl in January, 1999. Simmons eventually went on to win the competition five times (Wing Bowl IX, X, XI and XIII) between 1999 and 2005, becoming the only eater in Wing Bowl history to accomplish that feat. During Wing Bowl 14 in February 2006, Simmons' was inducted into the Wing Bowl Hall of Fame, and his name appears on a banner in the rafters at Philadelphia's Wells Fargo Center, the site of Wing Bowl since Wing Bowl VIII in 2000. At the peak of his eating prowess, Simmons stood at 6’5” and weighed 290 pounds.

== Television appearances ==
In 2001, Simmons was featured on Glutton Bowl, where he took first place in sushi eating.

== El Wingador Sauce ==
Becoming a local overnight sensation after winning Wing Bowl VII, Simmons decided to expand the El Wingador brand and created his own successful hot sauce, which sold across the country—even receiving orders from Alaska. Simmons announced on his podcast in 2019 that he is planning on restarting the company.

== Personal life ==
On June 16, 2012, Simmons was arrested and charged with first-degree cocaine distribution. Simmons was released on a $10,000 bail and issued the following statement:

"This isn't me. This isn't my style. I messed up big time and I give my sincerest apologies to anyone I have hurt by my actions,"

In July 2013, Simmons pled guilty to second-degree possession of cocaine with the intent to distribute. He was sentenced to seven years in state prison on October 4 of that same year. Simmons was released in May 2015, and vowed to gain control of his life and become a better example for his children, as well as others who made the same mistakes he did.

In January 2022 Simmons was arrested in Lincoln, Nebraska while traveling with 254 pounds of marijuana in vacuum sealed bags, 1-kilo of cocaine and $4,400 in cash bundled up, as well as drug paraphernalia.

== Snow On The Barb Wire ==
During his time incarcerated, Simmons began writing his memoir, Snow On The Barb Wire, with Joe Vallee, a South Jersey-based entrepreneur. Vallee, who often visited Simmons in prison, transcribed the chapters Simmons wrote from legal paper, and converted them into a document. Prior to Simmons' release, half of the book had already been completed. The second half, which detailed Simmons' prison experiences and his adjustment to life post-incarcertation, were finished upon his release—a painstaking task for Simmons, according to Vallee in the book acknowledgements, as recapping the previous events from the last several years was not something that came easily for him. Simmons later viewed the experience as therapeutic, as well as a stepping stone towards a path of spiritual healing.

Snow On The Barb Wire was released to critical acclaim in November 2016. Angelo Cataldi, co-creator of Wing Bowl and SportsRadio 94WIP Morning Show host, provided the foreword to the book. Some discussions with Simmons and Vallee have taken place with several Los Angeles-based film companies, in hopes of adapting the book into a screenplay. As of January 2020, no plans have been announced.

== Wing Vallee Podcast ==
Simmons and Vallee launched a podcast, aptly titled Wing Vallee, on Wildfire Radio in June 2019. The podcast, which centered around their restaurant quest, also featured interviews with fellow competitive eaters, including fellow multiple Wing Bowl champion Molly Schuyler as well as Celebrity Boxing promoter Damon Feldman. Wing Vallee aired for 13 episodes and concluded its run in October 2019.

== Restaurant ==
In September 2017, Simmons kickstarted a Philly Chicken Restaurant. In the wake of the natural disasters in Texas and Puerto Rico, the project proved unsuccessful.
