= Wingette =

Wingette may refer to

- Wing Bowl
- Middle section of chicken wings
