= Deanna Self =

American politician

Member of the Missouri House of Representatives from the 64th district
- Incumbent
- Assumed office January 8, 2025
- Preceded by: Tony Lovasco

Personal details
- Born: Wood River, Illinois, U.S.
- Party: Republican

Deanna Self is an American politician who was elected member of the Missouri House of Representatives for the 64th district in 2024.

Self and her husband have two daughters. She is a Baptist.
