= St. Dominic High School (Missouri) =

Public high school in Missouri, US

Location
- 31 St. Dominic Drive; O'Fallon, Missouri 63366; United States; 38°48′24″N 90°43′21″W

Information
- Type: Private high school
- Motto: Latin: Fortiter in fide (Bravely in faith)
- Religious affiliation: Roman Catholic
- Patron saint: St. Dominic
- Established: 1962; 64 years ago
- Oversight: Archdiocese of St. Louis
- President: Jim Welby
- Faculty: 64.9 (on an FTE basis)
- Grades: 9–12
- Enrollment: 1,087 (2023–24)
- Campus size: 50 acres (20 ha)
- Colors: Blue and white
- Athletics conference: Archdiocesan Athletic Association
- Nickname: (Lady) Crusaders
- Rival: Duchesne High School; St. Francis Borgia High School
- Accreditation: Cognia
- Newspaper: Crusader Nation
- Yearbook: Torch
- Tuition: $13,200 (2026–27)
- Affiliation: NCEA
- Website: stdominichs.org

St. Dominic High School (SDHS) is a private Roman Catholic high school in O'Fallon, Missouri, a suburb of St. Louis in St. Charles County. Founded in 1962 to replace the independent Assumption High School, it is operated by the Archdiocese of St. Louis.

== History ==
Assumption High School was founded in 1929. The school was staffed by the Sisters of the Most Precious Blood. When the school first started, classes took place in a white school house until 1955. By 1961 the increasing enrollment became too much for the small school. The Catholic high school petitioned the archdiocese for assistance with the help of the archdiocese. St. Dominic High School was able to build a new facility for students. It is now a regional high school serving more than eleven parishes. The school changed its name from Assumption to St. Dominic because they wanted to show their gratitude to the Dominican congregation of Our Lady of the Rosary. St. Dominic opened on September 4, 1962, but the first classes were held in the old Assumption building, while the new building and classes were being built. Students began attending the new St. Dominic High School in September 1963.

St. Dominic High School was established in 1962, replacing Assumption High School, which was closed due to deteriorating facilities. In response to growing enrollment, a 13-classroom addition, new library, and enlarged cafeteria were completed in 2000.

=== Staff ===
At one point in time, St. Dominic employed thirteen Dominican sisters. The last Dominican sister to leave, after serving 45 years, was Sr. Jeanne Margaret. The school is staffed by School Sisters of Notre Dame, an archdiocesan priest, and dedicated laymen and women.

== Campus ==
Located by Interstate 70 in O'Fallon, SDHS sits on a 50-acre campus.

In 2000, a new wing was built that included eighteen classrooms and a bigger library. Then in 2004, “Crusader Stadium” was built. In 2010, St. Dominic High School completed the addition of a multipurpose building which includes a gym, locker rooms, weight room, and a performing arts center.

== Athletics ==
St. Dominic competes as a full member of the Missouri State High School Activities Association (MSHSAA), where the boys compete as the Crusaders and the girls as the Lady Crusaders. Boys compete in basketball, soccer, golf, tennis, football, volleyball, track and field, baseball, and ice hockey. Offerings for girls include soccer, basketball, track and field, softball, field hockey, tennis, swimming, dance, golf, lacrosse, and cheerleading.

The school's ice hockey team competes in the Mid-States Club Hockey Association with other high schools in the St. Louis area.

The girls dance team were 2008–09 state champions.

=== MSHSAA state championships ===
The Crusaders and Lady Crusaders have won 16 MSHSAA state championships across six different sports as of the 2026–27 school year.

- Baseball (1): 2008
- Girls' basketball (1): 2011
- Boys' cross country (1): 2001
- Girls' golf (1): 2023
- Boys' soccer (5): 2004, 2008, 2009, 2012, 2013
- Girls' soccer (7): 2001, 2007, 2012, 2013, 2019, 2021, 2022

== Performing arts ==
St. Dominic has had a well-supported performing arts department since its inception. The theatre department puts on a yearly spring musical and fall play. In 2018 the school won several awards at the Saint Louis High School Musical Theatre Awards, including Best Show. St. Dominic has won several band and choir competitions throughout the country. In 2009, the parents and alumni created a performing arts support group called PALS (Performing Arts Lovers). This group is much like the Athletic Association in that it raises money to help support and offset costs for the music and theatre departments at St. Dominic.

== Notable alumni ==
- J. Peter Pham, academic and author
- Tim Ream (2006), soccer player with Fulham F.C. and the USMNT
- Josh Sargent (attended), soccer player with Norwich City F.C. and the USMNT
