= Irene Hannon =

American author

- Born: St. Louis, Missouri, U.S.
- Occupation: Author
- Education: Rosati-Kain High School; Saint Louis University (BA); University of Missouri (MA)
- Genre: Romance
- Spouse: Thomas Gottlieb

Website
- www.irenehannon.com

Irene Hannon (also known as Irene Hannon Gottlieb) is an American author of contemporary romance and romantic suspense novels. She was a communications executive with Anheuser-Busch.

== Early life and education ==
Hannon was born in St. Louis, Missouri to Dorothy Morgan and James Patrick Hannon Sr., an Irish immigrant. She and her brother James, Jr. grew up in Brentwood, Missouri a suburb of St. Louis where she frequently spent time at the local library, eventually working there in high school and college. Hannon graduated from Rosati-Kain High School, a Catholic school. She then graduated with a B.A. in psychology from Saint Louis University and an M.A. in journalism from the University of Missouri in Columbia.

== Career ==
While working at Anheuser-Busch, Hannon began publishing her writing in the 1980s, and eventually left her job to pursue writing fiction full-time.

She is married to Thomas Gottlieb, and she enjoys gardening, cooking, travelling, and singing in musicals. She typically writes 2.5 novels a year.

== Books ==
- Harbor Pointe, April 7, 2026 release, romantic fiction, ISBN 978-0800747596, publisher: Revell
- Out of Time, October 7, 2025 release, romantic suspense, Book 3: Undaunted Courage Series, ISBN 978-0800741907, publisher: Revell
- Sunrise Reef, April 1, 2025 release, romantic fiction, ISBN 978-0800741938, publisher: Revell
- Over The Edge, October 1, 2024 release, romantic suspense, Book 2: Undaunted Courage Series, ISBN 978-0800741891, publisher: Revell
- Sandcastle Inn, April 2, 2024 release, romantic fiction, ISBN 978-0800741921, publisher: Revell
- Into the Fire, October 3, 2023 release, romantic suspense, Book 1: Undaunted Courage Series, ISBN 978-0800741884, publisher: Revell
- Windswept Way, April 4, 2023 release, romantic fiction, ISBN 978-0800741914, publisher: Revell
- Body of Evidence, October 4, 2022 release, romantic suspense, Book 3: Triple Threat Series, ISBN 978-0800736194, publisher: Revell
- Sea Glass Cottage, April 5, 2022 release, romantic fiction, ISBN 978-0800736163, publisher: Revell
- Labyrinth of Lies, October 5, 2021 release, romantic suspense, Book 2: Triple Threat Series, ISBN 978-0800736187, publisher: Revell
- Blackberry Beach, April 6, 2021 release, romantic fiction, ISBN 978-0800736156, publisher: Revell
- Point of Danger, October 6, 2020 release, romantic suspense, Book 1: Triple Threat Series, ISBN 978-0800736170, publisher: Revell
- Starfish Pier, March 31, 2020 release, romantic fiction, ISBN 978-0800736149, publisher: Revell
- Dark Ambitions, October 1, 2019 release, romantic suspense, Book 3: Code of Honor Series, ISBN 978-0800727697, publisher: Revell
- Driftwood Bay, April 2, 2019 release, romantic fiction, ISBN 978-0800727703, publisher: Revell
- Hidden Peril, October 2, 2018 release, romantic suspense, Book 2: Code of Honor Series, ISBN 978-0800727697, publisher: Revell
- Pelican Point, April 3, 2018 release, romantic fiction, ISBN 978-0800728809, publisher: Revell
- Dangerous Illusions, October 3, 2017 release, romantic suspense, Book 1: Code of Honor Series, ISBN 978-0800727673, publisher: Revell
- Sandpiper Cove, April 4, 2017 release, romantic fiction, ISBN 978-0800727680, publisher: Revell
- Tangled Webs, October 4, 2016 release, romantic suspense, Book 3: Men of Valor Series, ISBN 978-0800724542, publisher: Revell
- Sea Rose Lane (A Hope Harbor novel), June 7, 2016 release, romantic fiction, ISBN 978-0800727543, publisher: Revell
- Thin Ice, January 5, 2016 release, romantic suspense, Book 2: Men of Valor Series, ISBN 978-0800724535, publisher: Revell
- Hope Harbor, August 4, 2015 release, romantic fiction, ISBN 978-0800724528, publisher: Revell
- Buried Secrets, April 7, 2015 release, romantic suspense, Book 1: Men of Valor Series, ISBN 978-0800721268, publisher: Revell
- Deceived, October 7, 2014 release, romantic suspense; Book 3: Private Justice Series, ISBN 978-0800721251, publisher: Revell
- Second Chance Summer, May 20, 2014 release, Book 4 Starfish Bay Series: ISBN 978-0-373-87891-8, publisher: Harlequin/Love Inspired
- One Perfect Spring, May 6, 2014 release, romantic fiction; ISBN 978-0373817702, publisher: Revell
- Trapped, September 1, 2013 release, romantic suspense; Book 2: Private Justice Series, ISBN 978-0800721244, publisher: Revell
- That Certain Summer, June 1, 2013 release, romantic fiction; ISBN 978-0800722494, publisher: Revell
- Seaside Blessings, May 21, 2013 release, Book 3 Starfish Bay Series: ISBN 978-0373878185, publisher: Harlequin/Love Inspired
- Vanished, January 1, 2013 release, romantic suspense; Book 1: Private Justice Series, ISBN 978-0800721237, publisher: Revell
- Finding Home, September 1, 2012 release, Book 2 Starfish Bay Series, ISBN 978-0373082513, publisher: Harlequin/Love Inspired
- Lethal Legacy, August 1, 2012 release, romantic suspense; Book 3: Guardians of Justice Series, ISBN 978-0800734589, publisher: Revell
- Seaside Reunion, December 2011 release, Book 1 Starfish Bay Series, ISBN 978-0373877157, publisher: Harlequin/Love Inspired
- Deadly Pursuit, September 2011 release, romantic suspense; Book 2: Guardians of Justice Series, ISBN 978-0-8007-3457-2, publisher: Revell
- The Heart Remembers, 2011, Originally published as "It Had To Be You", ISBN 978-0-373-36418-3, publisher: Harlequin/Love Inspired
- Fatal Judgment, January 2011 release, romantic suspense; Book 1: Guardians of Justice Series, ISBN 978-0-8007-3456-5, publisher: Revell
- In Harm's Way, April 2010 release, romantic suspense; Book 3: Heroes of Quantico Series, ISBN 978-0-8007-3312-4, publisher: Revell; released in India, Pakistan, Bangladesh, Sri Lanka and Nepal by VITASTA PUBLISHING PVT LTD.
- An Eye For An Eye, September 2009 release, romantic suspense; Book 2: Heroes of Quantico Series, ISBN 978-0-800-73311-7, publisher: Revell; German, Swiss, Austrian title/publisher: Im Fadenkreuz des Zweifels/Francke. released in India, Pakistan, Bangladesh, Sri Lanka and Nepal by VITASTA PUBLISHING PVT LTD. Marketed & distributed in India and Sub-continent by Times Group Books, a division of Bennett, Coleman & Co. Ltd., New Delhi.
- Against All Odds, February 2009 release, romantic suspense; Book 1: Heroes of Quantico Series, ISBN 978-0-800-73310-0, publisher: Revell; German, Swiss, Austrian title/publisher: Gegen jede Chance/Francke; Dutch title/publisher: Alle Schijn Tegen/Kok ten Have, Uitgeefmaatschappij. Released in India, Pakistan, Bangladesh, Sri Lanka and Nepal by VITASTA PUBLISHING PVT. LTD.
- Child of Grace, February 2011 release, publisher: Harlequin/Love Inspired
- A Father for Zach, April 2010 release; Book 4: Lighthouse Lane Series, ISBN 978-0-373-87591-7, publisher: Harlequin/Love Inspired
- The Doctor's Perfect Match, January 2010 release; Book 3: Lighthouse Lane Series, ISBN 978-0-373-87572-6, publisher: Harlequin/Love Inspired
- The Hero Next Door, August 2009 release; Book 2: Lighthouse Lane Series, ISBN 978-0-373-87541-2, publisher: Harlequin/Love Inspired
- Tides Of Hope, May 2009 release; Book 1: Lighthouse Lane Series, ISBN 978-0-373-87529-0, publisher: Harlequin/Love Inspired
- Apprentice Father, February 2009 release, ISBN 978-0-373-87515-3, publisher: Harlequin/Love Inspired
- Where Love Abides, 2008, ISBN 978-0-373-87479-8, publisher: Harlequin/Love Inspired
- From This Day Forward, 2007, ISBN 0-373-87455-3, publisher: Harlequin/Love Inspired
- Rainbow's End, 2007, ISBN 0-373-87415-4, publisher: Harlequin/Love Inspired
- The Family Man, 2006, ISBN 0-373-87392-1, publisher: Harlequin/Love Inspired
- All Our Tomorrows, 2006, ISBN 0-373-87381-6, originally published 2006 by Harlequin/Love Inspired
- The Unexpected Gift, 2005, ISBN 0-373-87329-8, publisher: Harlequin/Love Inspired
- Gift From The Heart, 2005, ISBN 0-37387317-4, publisher: Harlequin/Love Inspired
- The Best Gift, 2005, ISBN 9780373873029, publisher: Harlequin/Love Inspired
- Crossroads, 2003, ISBN 0-373-87231-3, publisher: Harlequin/Love Inspired
- Never Say Goodbye, 2002, ISBN 0-373-87182-1, publisher: Harlequin/Steeple Hill
- The Way Home, 2000, ISBN 0-373-87118-X, publisher: Harlequin/Steeple Hill
- One Special Christmas, 1999, ISBN 0-373-87077-9, publisher: Harlequin/Steeple Hill
- It Had To Be You, 1999, ISBN 0-373-87058-2, publisher: Harlequin/Steeple Hill
- A Family To Call Her Own, 1998, ISBN 0-373-87025-6; reissued 2005, ISBN 0-373-80975-1, publisher: Harlequin/Steeple Hill
- A Groom Of Her Own, 1998, ISBN 0-373-87016-7; reissued 2005, ISBN 0-373-80973-5, publisher: Harlequin/Steeple Hill
- Home For The Holidays, 1997, ISBN 0-373-87007-8, publisher: Harlequin/Steeple Hill
- A Delicate Balance, 1993, ISBN 0-8034-9040-2, publisher: Avalon
- A Rainbow In The Glen, 1993, ISBN 0-8034-9012-7, publisher: Avalon
- Mirror Image, 1992, ISBN 0-8034-8990-0, publisher: Avalon
- Spotlight On Love, 1992, ISBN 0-8034-8921-8, publisher: Avalon
- When Lilacs Bloom, 1991, ISBN 0-8034-8891-2, publisher: Avalon
- When The Heart Takes Wing, 1991, ISBN 0-8034-8860-2, publisher: Avalon
- Portrait Of Love, 1985, ISBN 0-8407-7373-0, publisher: Thomas Nelson
- In Name Only, 1985, ISBN 0-8407-7373-0, publisher: Thomas Nelson

== Reissues and anthologies ==
- The Heart Remembers, 2011, originally published as, "It Had To Be You," ISBN 978-0-373-36418-3, publisher: Harlequin/Steeple Hill
- Love Inspired Classics: One Special Christmas/Home for the Holidays, 2010,ISBN 978-0-373-65141-2, publisher: Harlequin/Steeple Hill
- Love Inspired Classics: The Best Gift & Gift From The Heart, 2009, ISBN 978-0-373-65131-3, publisher: Harlequin/Steeple Hill
- Love Inspired Classics: Never Say Goodbye & Crossroads, 2008, ISBN 978-0-373-65117-7, publisher: Harlequin/Steeple Hill
- Love Inspired Classics: A Groom Of Her Own & The Way Home, 2008, ISBN 0-373-65270-4, publisher: Harlequin/Steeple Hill
- Together Again, contains "It Had To Be You," 2003, ISBN 0-373-87130-9, publisher: Harlequin/Steeple Hill
- The Three Gifts, contains "One Special Christmas," 2002, ISBN 0-373-87240-2, publisher: Harlequin/Steeple Hill
- Holiday Blessings, contains "Home For The Holidays," with Debbie Macomber and Janet Peart; 2000, ISBN 0-373-78525-9, publisher: Harlequin/Steeple Hill
- Crossings Inspirational Romance Reader, contains "A Family To Call Her Own," 1998, ISBN 978-0-7394-0528-4, publisher: Harlequin/Steeple Hill

== Awards and reception ==
- 2003 - Romance Writers of America RITA Award, Inspirational Romance – Never Say Goodbye
- 2011 - Romance Writers of America RITA Award, Inspirational Romance – In Harm's Way
- 2015 - Romance Writers of America RITA Award, Inspirational Romance – Deceived

She was also inducted in the Romance Writers of America's Hall of Fame. Her other awards include four Carol Awards, six Holt Medallions, a Daphne du Maurier Award, and a Lifetime Achievement Award from Romantic Times Book Reviews.
