= Susan Carlson (politician) =

American politician

Member of the Missouri House of Representatives from the 64th district
- In office 2011–2013
- Preceded by: Rachel Storch
- Succeeded by: Robert Cornejo (redistricting)

Personal details
- Born: November 2, 1949 (age 76)
- Party: Democratic
- Education: University of Nebraska–Lincoln

Susan Carlson (born November 2, 1949) is an American politician who was as a Democratic member of the Missouri House of Representatives.
