= Robert Cornejo =

American politician (born 1983)

Member of the Missouri House of Representatives from the 64th district
- In office January 7, 2013 – August 2018
- Preceded by: Susan Carlson (redistricted)
- Succeeded by: Tony Lovasco

Personal details
- Born: March 25, 1983 (age 43) St. Louis County, Missouri, United States
- Party: Republican

Robert Cornejo (born March 25, 1983) is an American Republican politician, currently serving as a circuit judge in St. Charles County, Missouri.

He is a former member of the Missouri House of Representatives from the 64th District, first elected in 2012 and having served into 2018. Cornejo resigned in August 2018 when Governor Mike Parson appointed him to become chairman of the Labor and Industrial Relations Commission, which oversees Missouri's Department of Labor and Industrial Relations.

In February 2022 Governor Parson again appointed Cornejo, to Associate Circuit Judge in St. Charles County division 13. In 2024, Cornejo sought election as circuit 11 judge for division 4 and lost in the Republican primary to Matthew Thornhill. After his election loss Cornejo opened his own law practice, Robert Cornejo Law, LLC. On February 26, 2026, Missouri Governor Mike Kehoe appointed Cornejo to Circuit Judge in St. Charles County Division 4 following the vacancy created after the removal of Judge Matthew Thornhill.

In 2005, Cornejo graduated from Washington University in St. Louis with a dual major in Political Science and International Business. He then attended the University of Missouri School of Law, graduating in May 2008.

== Election results ==
Missouri Circuit Court Judge – Circuit 11 Division 4 (2024 primary)
Party	Candidate	Votes	%	±%
Republican	Robert Cornejo	17,008	39%	
Republican	Dennis R. Chassaniol	7,611	18%	
Republican	Matthew Thornhill	18,493	43%	

Missouri House of Representatives — District 64 — St. Charles County (2016)
Party	Candidate	Votes	%	±%
Republican	Robert Cornejo	8,566	64.89%	−2.89
Democratic	Mark Routburg	4,634	35.11%	+2.89

Missouri House of Representatives — District 64 — St. Charles County (2014)
Party	Candidate	Votes	%	±%
Republican	Robert Cornejo	4,280	67.78%	+13.51
Democratic	Laura Castaneda	2,035	32.22%	−13.51

Missouri House of Representatives — District 64 — St. Charles County (2012)
Party	Candidate	Votes	%	±%
Republican	Robert Cornejo	6,353	54.27%	
Democratic	Wayne Henke	5,353	45.73%	
