= Randy Santel =

American competitive eater and social media personality

- Born: Randall Joseph Santel; June 24, 1986 (age 40); St. Louis, Missouri, U.S.
- Education: Missouri State University (BS, BS); Mount Mary University (MS)
- Spouse: Katina DeJarnett (m. 2026)

Instagram information
- Page: randysantel
- Years active: 2012–present
- Followers: 381 thousand

TikTok information
- Page: randysantel
- Years active: 2022–present
- Followers: 1.7 million

X information
- Handle: @RandySantel
- Years active: 2011–present
- Followers: 16.2 thousand

YouTube information
- Channel: RandySantel
- Years active: 2011–present
- Subscribers: 1.84 million
- Views: 597 million
- Last updated: June 7, 2026
- Website: randysantel.com

Randall Joseph Santel (born June 24, 1986) is an American YouTuber, competitive eater, influencer, and dietitian. Santel is well known for traveling to restaurants all over the world to take their food challenges.

== Early life and education ==
Santel attended Duchesne High School. Santel played as an offensive lineman and got first-team Missouri Football Coaches Association All-State Team. During high school, Santel played on their football team, and worked at Subway as a sandwich artist. Santel was also an Eagle Scout.

Santel attended Missouri State University, and played offensive lineman for 3 years on the Missouri State Bears football team. He graduated with a bachelor's degree in Construction management in 2008 Santel get a job working in construction, but within a year he wanted to pursue a different career, and officially retired from working in the construction industry in 2013.

In 2016, Santel went back to Missouri State to obtain a second bachelor's degree in dietetics in 2019. He then attended and graduated from Mount Mary University with a master's degree in dietetics. During his time as a master's student, Santel completed a 1,200-hour long internship.

== Career ==
Santel got into competitive eating in 2010 after he entered and won a 12-week long national body transformation challenge called the "Men's Health/Starz "Spartacus" Challenge" alongside a friend. They both celebrated the win by taking on, what would inevitably be, his first official food challenge where he had to eat a 28-inch pizza. After winning the challenge, Santel decided to pursue food challenges as a career.

In 2011, Santel landed a role on the TV show Spartacus: Blood and Sand.

At some point, Santel held the record for Sinful Burger's "Goliath" Challenge in Bellevue, Nebraska, consisting of eating 5 pounds (2.3 kg) of food including two 1.5 pounds (680 g) hamburgers topped with ten slices of cheese, lettuce, tomato and onions, between two large pieces of Indian fry bread, with a 1 pound (450 g) side of French fries; however, in September 2012 Molly Schuyler set a new record for the Goliath challenge, of 17 minutes and three seconds. Sinful Burger thus renamed Randy's Wall to Molly's Wall. On November 10, 2012, Molly Schuyler defeated Santel in a Goliath challenge face-off, finishing in 6 minutes and 43 seconds.

In 2014, Santel launched foodchallenges.com: a go-to website for aspiring competitive eaters. In June 2015, Santel's channel surpassed 100,000 subscribers. Santel won his 1,000th challenge in May 2021.

== Personal life ==
Santel previously resided in Milwaukee as late as 2023. Santel is married to former bodybuilder and fellow competitive eater Katina DeJarnett (aka Katina Eats Kilos on YouTube) as of October 2026. The couple has resided in Nashville, Tennessee since 2025.

== Food challenges ==
Date	Challenge Title	Restaurant	Location
2010	28-inch Pointersaurus Pizza Challenge	Pointer's Pizza	St. Louis, Missouri
2021	Big Joe	Frank's Pizzeria	Omaha, Nebraska
2021	Brutus' Big Brother	Doo-Dah Diner's	Wichita, Kansas
2021	Culver's Double Deluxe Butter Burger Challenge	Culver's	Brooksville, Florida
2022	5lb Godfather Calzone Challenge	Milano Italian Restaurant	Shelbyville, Kentucky
2023	6lb Double Cheeseburger Challenge	Bean City Bar & Grill	New London, Wisconsin
2024	36" Godfather Pizza Challenge	Sal's Family Pizza	Franklin, Tennessee
2024	28" Pizza Challenge	Benny DiCarta's	Kalamazoo, Michigan
2024	Bamboozler Challenge	Vermillion Club	Tower, Minnesota
2025	Piezilla Pizza Challenge	Cici's Pizza	Lebanon, Tennessee
2025	Gridiron 30" Challenge	End Zone Pizza & Deli	Augusta, Maine
2025	The Big Pig Challenge	Golden Rule BBQ	Irondale, Alabama
2025	Quad Scooter Burger Challenge	Scooters Sports Grill	Scottsboro, Alabama
2025	Scoop Sink Ice Cream Sundae Challenge	Skylar's Skoops	Muscle Shoals, Alabama
