= Tony Lovasco =

American politician from Missouri

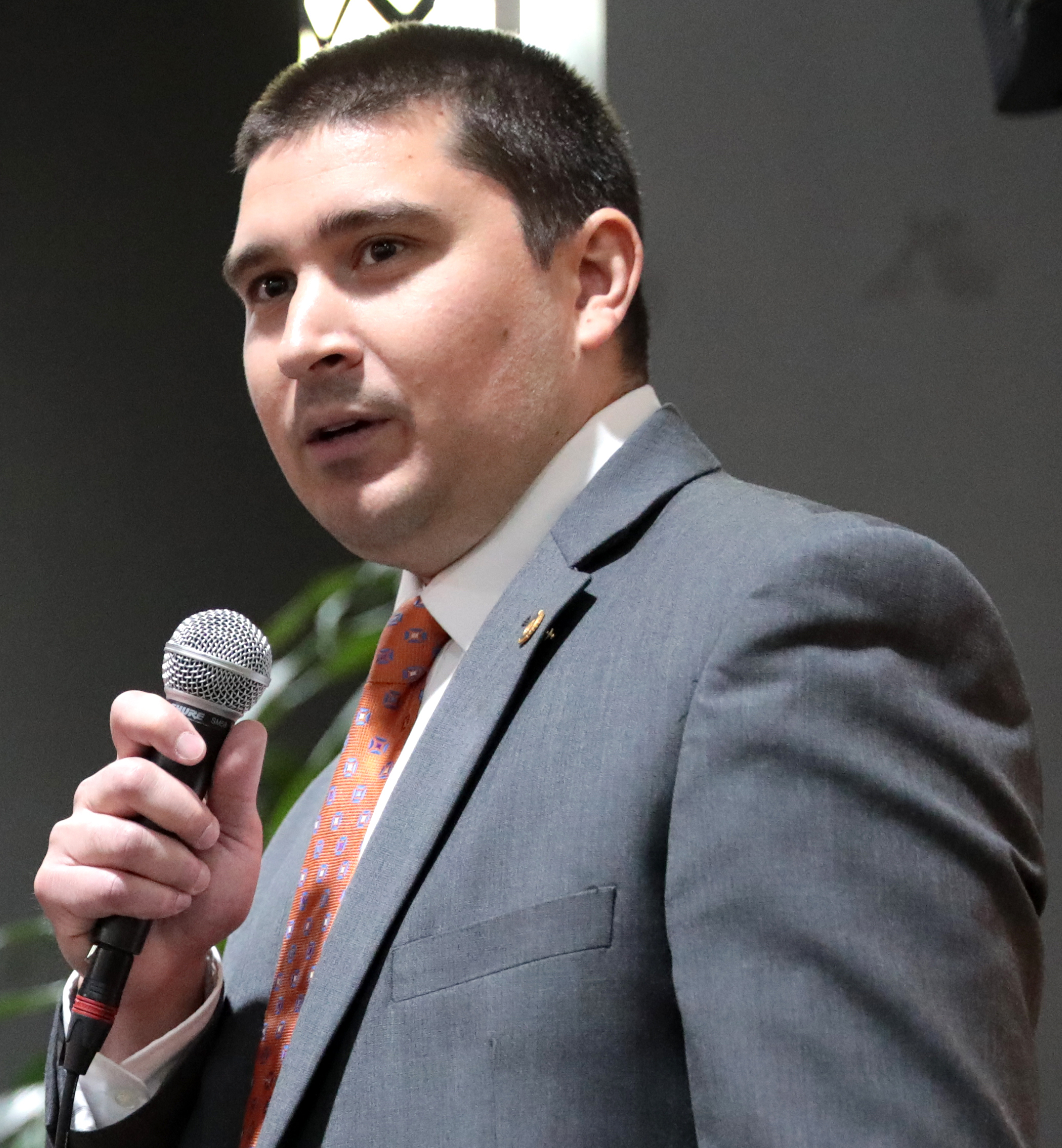
- Lovasco in 2019

Member of the Missouri House of Representatives from the 64th district
- In office January 9, 2019 – January 8, 2025
- Preceded by: Robert Cornejo
- Succeeded by: Deanna Self

Personal details
- Party: Republican
- Spouse: Eva (m. 2014)
- Education: Duchesne High School
- Website: tonylovasco.com

Tony Lovasco is a Republican politician who served as a member of the Missouri House of Representatives from 2019 to 2025. He represented the 64th district, which as of 2022 encompasses a portion of northwest St. Charles County, including a northern part of Wentzville, much of northern O'Fallon, and St. Paul, from 2019 through 2024. Lovasco was elected to the Missouri House in November 2018. In 2026, he is running to represent Missouri's 63rd district, which includes central Wentzville and the intersection of Interstate 70 and U.S. Route 61.

== Education and career ==
Lovasco is a lifelong St. Charles County resident and graduated in 2003 from Duchesne High School in St. Charles. He has attended the University of Missouri–St. Louis. Since his high school graduation, Lovasco has worked in sales for a surplus IT disposition company and has experience with Linux deployment and maintenance.

== Politics ==
Lovasco is active in local Republican organizations and served as a committeeman and board member. After district 64 representative Robert Cornejo resigned in August 2018 to take a job in Governor Parson's administration, Lovasco was appointed by local Republicans to replace Cornejo on the November ballot. Lovasco defeated Democrat Shawn Finklein in the 2018 general election.

On May 29, 2020, Lovasco made national news when, during national protests over the murder of George Floyd by a Minneapolis policeman during an arrest four days earlier, he stated on Twitter that "Looters deserve to be shot...But not by Government. #2A".

Unopposed in the August 2020 Republican primary, Lovasco defeated Democratic challenger Aaliyah Bailey in November 2020 with over 68 percent of the vote.

In response to the removal of a statue of Confederate general Robert E. Lee in Richmond, Virginia, Lovasco tweeted on September 9, 2021, that removal of statues of "reprehensible people" should be "fair and balanced", with an included image of the Lincoln Memorial in Washington, D.C.

Lovasco won the 2022 Republican primary election against two challengers, though by less than two percentage points. He was unopposed in the general election.

In January 2023, he promoted a bill titled "HB869" to the Missouri House of Representatives. The bill was to loosen the penalty for possession and use of psilocybin. The bill was not passed.

Lovasco opposes the death penalty and in 2024 sought commutation for Brian Dorsey, who was convicted of killing his cousin and her husband in 2006. Governor Parson denied clemency and Dorsey was executed in April 2024.

Lovasco lost reelection in the 2024 Republican primary to Deanna Self, a licensed professional counselor and anti-abortion activist.

In 2026, Lovasco is running to represent Missouri's 63rd house district, whose incumbent representative is running for state senator.

=== Legislative assignments ===
As of 2024, Representative Lovasco served on the following committees:

- House General Laws
- Downsizing State Government
- House Ways and Means
- Joint Committee on Tax Policy

In 2020, Lovasco was a member of a special committee on Criminal Justice.

== Electoral history ==
Missouri House of Representatives — District 64 — Lincoln and St. Charles Counties (2018)
Party	Candidate	Votes	%	±%
Republican	Tony Lovasco	10,538	61.55%	
Democratic	Shawn Finklein	6,583	38.45%	
Total votes		17,121	100.00%	

Missouri House of Representatives — District 64 — Lincoln and St. Charles Counties (2020)
Party	Candidate	Votes	%	±%
Republican	Tony Lovasco	15,954	68.88%	+7.33
Democratic	Aaliyah Bailey	7,209	31.12%	−7.33
Total votes		23,163	100.00%	

Missouri House of Representatives Primary Election, August 2, 2022, District 64
Party	Candidate	Votes	%	±%
Republican	Tony Lovasco	1,621	36.25%	
Republican	Deanna Self	1,555	34.77%	
Republican	Mike Swaringim	1,296	28.98%	
Total votes		4,472	100.00%	

Missouri House of Representatives Election, November 8, 2022, District 64
Party	Candidate	Votes	%	±%
Republican	Tony Lovasco	10,252	100.00%	+31.12
Total votes		10,252	100.00%	

Missouri House of Representatives Primary Election, August 6, 2024, District 64
Party	Candidate	Votes	%	±%
Republican	Deanna Self	2,852	59.6%	
Republican	Tony Lovasco	1,936	40.4%	
Total votes		4,788	100.00%	
