= Rockwell Knuckles =

American rapper

- Also known as: Rocky
- Born: Corey Barnett; 1982 or 1983 (age 43–44); St. Louis, Missouri
- Genres: Rap, Hip hop
- Instrument: Vocals
- Years active: 2000–present
- Label: Mech Industries LLC

Rockwell Knuckles is a hip hop/rap artist from St. Louis, Missouri. He has performed at SXSW and has been nominated for several Riverfront Times Music Awards. Rockwell currently resides in Brooklyn, NY.

== Early life and career ==
Corey Barnett was born on the north-side of St. Louis, Missouri. He went to high school at Cardinal Ritter College Prep High School. It was there, where Barnett earned his stage name. After being bullied at a bus stop, he punched the guy in the mouth. After a friend commented that he had 'rocky knuckles,' he started to go by that name. But then a lot of rappers in St. Louis started having names that end in y. So he thought: "What do I do? I rock. I rock well: Rockwell Knuckles." After high school, Rockwell Knuckles enrolled at Harris-Stowe State University, but soon dropped out and joined a group of seven St. Louis rappers who called themselves Pangea. By 2003, the group had split and Rockwell moved to Los Angeles to record a project with a production team called the Art Thugs. In July 2004, his house caught fire and he lost all of his possessions, prompting him to start over on his own and launch his solo career.

== Solo career ==
Rockwell Knuckles produced a 29-track mixtape called The New Standard and released it in late 2005. This mixtape led to opening gigs for artists such as GZA, RJD2 and Brother Ali. In 2007, he worked on writing songs for his first album: Northside Phenomenon, which was released in November 2007. In February 2008, he took part in the Koch Madness competition, losing in the semi-finals to the eventual winner, Nite Owl.

In 2010, Rockwell Knuckles released Choose Your Own Adventure, a project that led to live performances alongside Lupe Fiasco, Pac Div, BIG K.R.I.T., J. Cole, GZA and Yelawolf, among others. He subsequently released his full-length album You're Fucking Out, I'm Fucking In.

On August 30, 2010, a reviewer on Uproxx.com wrote, "Every SXSW creates new stars. It’s undeniable. Everyone that attends leaves the event excited about the performance of a relative unknown, claiming that said artist is going to be the next big music star. Last year was my first SXSW and the artist I pinpointed for greatness was B.o.B This year I pegged two acts for stardom: Yelawolf and Rockwell Knuckles." On April 13, 2010, his song "Government Name" was featured on Good Music All Day.

In the 2011 ski/ride movie One For The Road by Teton Gravity Research, Rockwell Knuckle's song "Play Catch" was featured on the soundtrack. The soundtrack won Best Soundtrack at the International Freeski Film Festival in Montreal, Quebec.
