= Cardinal Ritter College Prep High School =

Private school in St. Louis, Missouri, United States

Cardinal Ritter College Preparatory High School

Location
- 701 North Spring Avenue; St. Louis, Missouri 63108; United States; 38°38′31.7″N 90°14′6.54″W

Information
- Type: Private college-preparatory school
- Religious affiliation: Roman Catholic
- Established: 1979; 47 years ago
- Oversight: Archdiocese of St. Louis
- President: Tamiko Armstead
- Principal: Craig Edwards
- Staff: 22
- Faculty: 39
- Grades: 9–12
- Gender: Co-ed
- Student to teacher ratio: 12:1
- Colors: Maroon, white, and black
- Athletics conference: Archdiocesan Athletic Association
- Nickname: Lions
- Accreditation: Cognia
- Tuition: $10,000
- Alumni news: Roat
- Website: cardinalritterprep.org
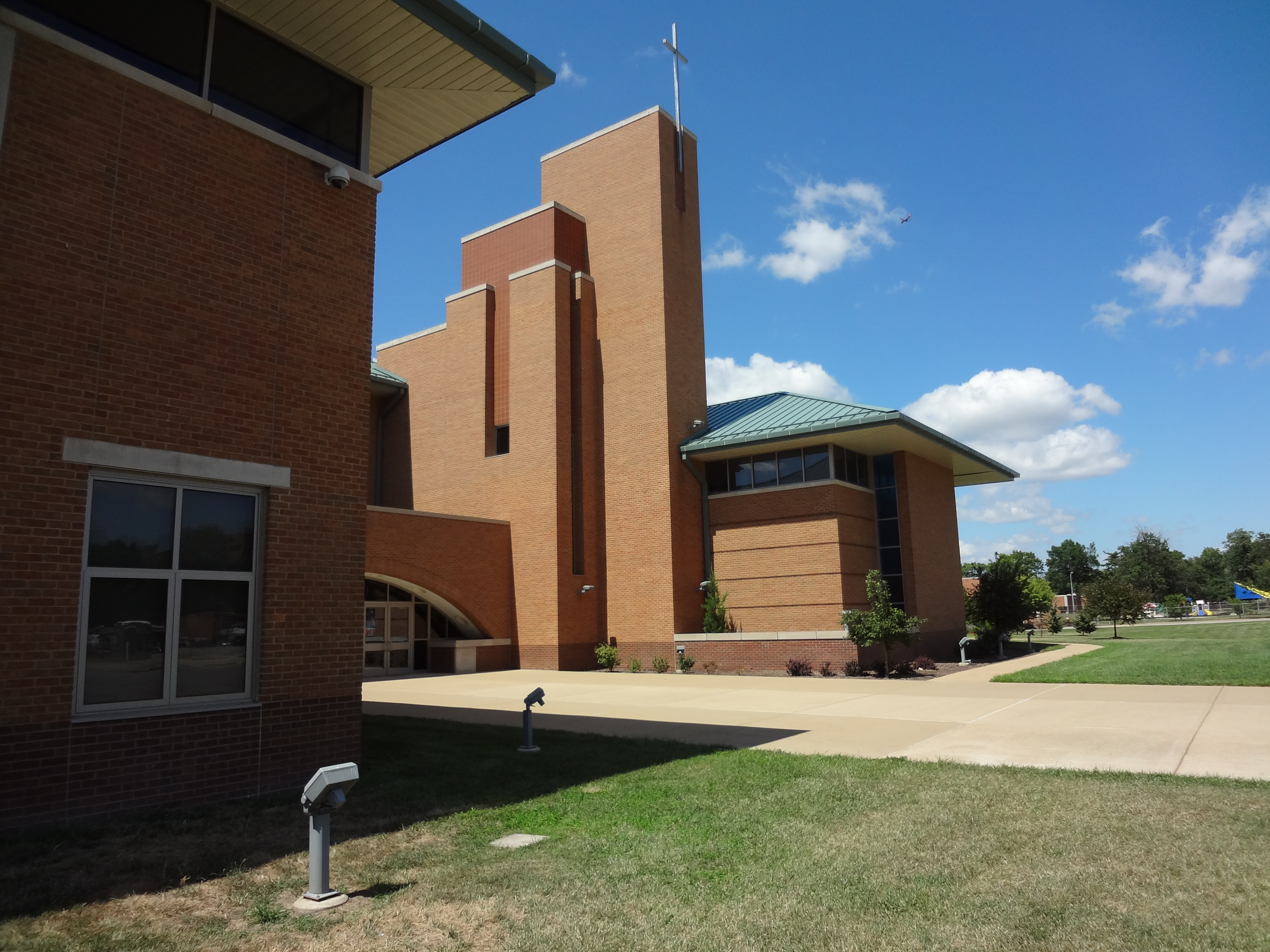

Cardinal Ritter College Prep High School, abbreviated CRCP or CR, is a private, Catholic high school in St. Louis, Missouri. It is located in the Archdiocese of Saint Louis.

== Background ==
Cardinal Ritter Prep opened on September 6, 1979. It is named for Cardinal Joseph Ritter, Archbishop of St. Louis in the mid-20th century. From 1977–1978, a community representative task force was established by the Board of Catholic Education of the St. Louis Archdiocese to study the future existence of a Catholic school in the old Labouré location in North St. Louis. Arrangements to establish Cardinal Ritter College Prep High School as a co-educational college preparatory high school began in August 1979.

On May 18, 2003, Cardinal Justin Rigali dedicated the new Cardinal Ritter Preparatory High School adjacent to the Saint Louis University campus. The school opened for students in August 2003. Ritter Prep is ranked in the top 50% among the large private high schools in Missouri.

== Location ==
When the school first opened, it was located in the neighborhood of Walnut Park. In 2003, a new location was opened adjacent to Saint Louis University on 701 N. Spring Ave.

== Athletics ==
The school is in MSHSAA Class 3, with some sports played in different classes based on size and success. Cardinal Ritter plays soccer in Class 1, while its football program has moved up from Class 3 to the much more prestigious Class 5 in recent years to accommodate the level of success the team has had. The athletic conference they are a member of is the Archdiocesan Athletic Association. The school has 8 varsity sports. Sports offered here are Football, Volleyball, Dance, Cheerleading, Cross Country, Boys Basketball, Girls Basketball, Baseball, Boys Track & Field, and Girls Track & Field.

== Notable alumni ==
- Chopsquad DJ, DJ
- Chris Carrawell, former NBA basketball player
- Ali Jones, rapper
- Rockwell Knuckles, rapper
- Fredrick Moore, American football player
- Jahidi White, basketball player
- Jameson Williams, American football player
- Loren Woods, basketball player
- Luther Burden III, American football player
