= Molly Schuyler =

American competitive eater (born 1979)

Molly Schuyler is an American competitive eater. In 2013, she signed with the competitive eating organization All Pro Eating. She has stated that she "usually swallows her food whole."

== Career ==
In August 2012, she became the first woman to complete the Stellanator, a food challenge at Stella's Bar and Grill in Bellevue, Nebraska. The Stellanator sandwich includes six hamburger patties, six eggs, six pieces of cheese and six pieces of bacon topped with fried onions, jalapeños, lettuce, tomatoes, pickles, two buns, and mayonnaise.

In September 2012, she became the first woman to attempt (and to win) Sinful Burger's "Goliath" Challenge in Bellevue, Nebraska, 5 pounds (2.3 kg) of food that includes two 1.5 pounds (680 g) hamburgers topped with ten slices of cheese, lettuce, tomato and onions, between two large pieces of Indian fry bread, with a 1 pound (450 g) side of French fries. She set a new record for the Goliath challenge, 17 minutes and three seconds. Sinful Burger thus renamed Randy's Wall (for Randy Santel, who held the previous record for the challenge) to Molly's Wall.

In October 2012, she won the Pig Wings Challenge at Starsky's in Omaha, Nebraska, which had previously been featured on the Travel Channel's Man v. Food Nation, in 38 minutes. She later finished the Pig Wing challenge in under 12 minutes. In that same month she became the first woman to try (and to win) the Big Axe Calzone challenge, held by the Old River Pizza Company in Council Bluffs, Iowa. She finished in 11 minutes and 23 seconds, a record for the challenge. Also that month Schuyler and her friend Tyler Danforth ate the Big Joe Pizza at Frank's Pizzeria in Nebraska in 28 minutes. The Big Joe is 12 pounds (5.4 kg) of pizza—4 pounds (1.8 kg) of crust, 2 pounds (910 g) of cheese, 2 pounds (910 g) of pepperoni, 2 pounds (910 g) of sausage and 26 ounces (740 g) of sauce—and two challengers must eat it in one hour to win.

Later in October, Schuyler became the first person to attempt (and to win) the Nebraska Brewing Company's Death Pizza challenge, a 5 pounds (2.3 kg) pie covered in sauce made with ghost chili peppers. She finished in 24 minutes, 56 seconds. Since she was the first person to win the challenge, she got to name the pizza, and named it "Molly's Humble Pie." On November 10, 2012, she defeated Randy Santel in a Goliath challenge face-off, finishing in 6 minutes and 43 seconds.

In December 2012, she became the first woman to win the Adam Emmenecker Challenge—eating a 5-lb (2.3 kg) barbecue meal at Jethro's Des Moines-area restaurant. She did so again a few weeks later, and in January 2013 she did so a third time.

In early 2014, Schuyler broke the 72 ounces (2.0 kg) steak eating world record, having eaten it in 2 minutes and 44 seconds at Sayler's Old Country Kitchen in Portland, Oregon. Schuyler holds a similar May 2014 record at Amarillo's Big Texan Steak Ranch, eating a 72 ounces (2.0 kg) steak with side dishes in 4 minutes 58 seconds and returning for another meal (with a total time of 14 minutes 57 seconds for both meals).

In January 2014, she won Wing Bowl 22 in Philadelphia, Pennsylvania. She ate 363 wings, a Wing Bowl record. The next day, February 1, 2014, she won the IHOP Pancake Bowl, as well as winning the bacon-eating contest at the Blue Ribbon Bacon Festival in Des Moines by eating 5 pounds of bacon in 3 minutes. Shortly after she completed the Adam Emmenecker Challenge on Sunday, February 2, 2014.

In July 2014, she became the first woman to win Z-Burger's Independence Burger Eating Contest in Washington, DC, eating 26 burgers in 10 minutes. She won for the ninth time in July 2023.

In March 2015, she set a world record by eating a four-pound sandwich and one pound of tater tots in 2 minutes and 55 seconds. That same month she established another world record by eating five pounds of bacon in 5 minutes and 2.1 seconds.

In April 2015, she returned to Big Texan Steak Ranch and ate three 72-oz. steak dinners in 20 minutes. She completed the first meal in a record 4 minutes 18 seconds, beating her own (and the restaurant's) record by 40 seconds.

In July 2015, Schuyler won the corndog eating contest at the California State Fair in Sacramento, California by eating 33 corndogs in eight minutes. She also set a new record in Austin, Minnesota for the "Tendermaid Challenge" for consuming 30 burgers, 80 ounces of water, a bag of chips, and a malt in less than 30 minutes.

In September 2015, Schuyler claimed first prize at New York City's Dumpling Festival's dumpling eating contest by eating 93 dumplings in two minutes, beating her own 2013 record of 90 dumplings in two minutes. She currently holds the record in both the men's and women's divisions.

On February 11, 2017, Schuyler and Tony Mitchell teamed up for The Don, a 32-inch pizza at Mamma Mia's in Rockford, Illinois. The challenge was completed by them in 15 minutes.

In June 2017, Molly visited Wards House of Prime in Milwaukee, WI and ate 360 ounces (10.2 kg) of Ward's Famous Prime Rib in 90 minutes.

Molly Schuyler was named the winner of the July 27, 2017, episode of ABC's revived The Gong Show. Her performance consisted of her eating six large deli containers full of cottage cheese in under 90 seconds.

In February 2018, she won Wing Bowl 26 in Philadelphia, Pennsylvania. She ate 501 wings, a Wing Bowl record.

Schuyler completed a double Chubby's Avalanche Challenge at Chubby's Southern Barbecue in Emmitsburg, Maryland on August 17, 2019. Each Avalanche burger includes eight half-pound hamburger patties, each with two slices of American cheese, eight Louisiana hot link sausages, lettuce, and tomato; to complete the double challenge, she ate two Avalanche burgers—about 16 pounds (7.5 kg) of food—in 29 minutes, 1 second.

In July 2025, she captured her 11th title of the annual Z-Burger Independence Burger Eating Championship.

== Personal life ==
Formerly of Montevideo, Minnesota, she currently lives in Harwood, Maryland. She is married with four children.

== See also ==
- List of competitive eaters
