= N. Anthony Coles =

American physician and biotechnology executive

- Born: Neavelle Anthony Coles; May 17, 1960 (age 65); Roanoke, Virginia, U.S.
- Education: Johns Hopkins University (BA); Harvard University (MPH); Duke University (MD)
- Occupations: Physician, biotechnology executive
- Spouse: Robyn Coles
- Children: 3

Neavelle Anthony Coles (born May 17, 1960) is an American physician and biotechnology executive. He has served as chairman of the board of directors of Cerevel Therapeutics, a company focused on neurological disease treatments, since 2018, and was its chief executive officer from 2019 to 2023.

== Early life and education ==
Coles was born in Roanoke, Virginia, to Neavelle Anthony Coles, an accountant and minister, and Leona Rogers Coles, an office manager. He graduated from DuVal High School in Lanham, Maryland.

Coles earned a Bachelor of Arts from Johns Hopkins University, a Master of Public Health from Harvard University, and a Doctor of Medicine from Duke University. He completed cardiology and internal medicine training at Massachusetts General Hospital and a research fellowship at Harvard Medical School. In 2024, Duke University School of Medicine honored him with its Transformational Leadership Award.

== Career ==
Coles began his career in pharmaceuticals, holding executive roles at Merck & Co. (marketing ACE inhibitors), Bristol-Myers Squibb (senior vice president of strategy and policy, and marketing for neuroscience and infectious diseases), and Vertex Pharmaceuticals (senior vice president of commercial operations).

From 2005 to 2008, Coles served as chief operating officer and president of NPS Pharmaceuticals, becoming chief executive officer in 2006. He was president and CEO of Onyx Pharmaceuticals from 2008 to 2013, and chairman from 2012 to 2013, overseeing its $10.4 billion sale to Amgen in 2013.

In 2014, Coles co-founded Yumanity Therapeutics with Susan Lindquist, serving as chairman and CEO until 2018, focusing on treatments for Alzheimer’s and Parkinson’s diseases. Since 2013, he has been chairman and CEO of TRATE Enterprises, a private real estate and ventures company.

At Cerevel Therapeutics, Coles served as CEO from 2019 to 2023, leading a $445 million public listing in 2020, and has been chairman since 2018. He also serves on the board of directors of Regeneron Pharmaceuticals. In 2021, he was elected to the American Academy of Arts and Sciences.

== Civic and professional affiliations ==
Coles is co-founder and co-chair of the Black Economic Alliance, a nonprofit focused on economic equity. He serves on the boards of the Metropolitan Museum of Art, the Council on Foreign Relations, and the U.S. Olympic and Paralympic Foundation, and is a former trustee of Johns Hopkins University.

== Personal life ==
Coles is married to Robyn Coles, and they have three sons. Their eldest son was diagnosed with non-Hodgkin’s lymphoma at age 12 and underwent treatment at Memorial Sloan Kettering Cancer Center.
