= J. Peter Pham =

American academic and author

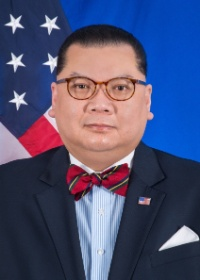

United States Special Envoy for the Sahel Region of Africa
- In office March 1, 2020 – January 20, 2021
- President: Donald Trump
- Preceded by: Office established

United States Special Envoy for the African Great Lakes
- In office October 29, 2018 – March 1, 2020
- President: Donald Trump
- Preceded by: Tom Perriello

Personal details
- Born: John Peter Pham
- Education: University of Chicago (B.A.), Gregorian University (Ph.D.)

John Peter Pham is an American academic and author specializing in international relations with a focus on African affairs. Pham was the United States Special Envoy for the Sahel Region of Africa, from March 2020 until the end of President Donald Trump's administration in January 2021. Prior to this, he served as the Special Envoy for the Great Lakes Region of Africa from November 2018. Prior to these appointments, Pham was also Vice President of the Atlantic Council and Director of its Africa Center. In September 2020, Pham was accorded the personal rank of ambassador, becoming the first Vietnamese American to achieve that rank. After leaving the Trump administration, Pham rejoined the Atlantic Council as a Distinguished Fellow, and also serves on the boards of several listed as well as privately held corporations.

== Career ==
Pham attended St. Dominic High School in O'Fallon, Missouri, suburb of St. Louis. He then received a B.A. in economics from the University of Chicago, and a Ph.D. from the Gregorian University. In August 2004, Pham joined the faculty of James Madison University in Harrisonburg, Virginia as a member of the institution's new justice studies program. He thereafter became a tenured associate professor of Justice Studies, Political Science, and Africana Studies, was director of the Nelson Institute for International and Public Affairs.

Pham went to Liberia in 2005 to serve as member of the USAID-funded International Republican Institute (IRI) delegation monitoring the national elections in that country. In 2006 and 2007, Pham served in the IRI pre-election assessment and observation delegations in Nigeria, respectively. He served on an IRI election observation delegation in Somaliland in 2010.

While on sabbatical from James Madison University from 2009 to 2011, Pham served as senior vice president of the National Committee on American Foreign Policy, and editor of its bimonthly journal, American Foreign Policy Interests, and has been a member of the Senior Advisory Group of the United States Africa Command from its creation until 2013. Since 2011, Pham has been director of the Africa Center at the Atlantic Council think tank in Washington, D.C. and, since 2016, also served as vice president for research and regional initiatives.

In April 2015, the Regents of the Smithsonian Institution elected Pham to the National Advisory Board of the National Museum of African Art, of which he is currently co-vice chair. Pham is the incumbent vice president of the Association for the Study of the Middle East and Africa, an American learned society dedicated to research and teaching in Middle East and African Studies, and was editor-in-chief of its quarterly Journal of the Middle East and Africa. He is also a frequent guest lecturer on African affairs at the Foreign Service Institute, the U.S. Army War College, the Joint Special Operations University, and other U.S. Government professional educational institutions, and appears as a commentator on broadcast and print media outlets.

In late 2016, Pham "published a paper widely taken as an Africa policy manifesto for the new administration" of President-elect Donald Trump. It was thereafter reported in January 2017 that Trump was considering Pham for the position of Assistant Secretary of State for African Affairs in the State Department. On November 9, 2018, the State Department announced Pham's appointment as United States Special Envoy for the Great Lakes Region of Africa. On March 1, 2020, it was announced that Pham was appointed to the newly created position of United States Special Envoy for the Sahel Region of Africa. After serving in the first Trump administration, Pham joined the boards of several companies involved in strategic sectors in Africa, including Africell, the sole U.S.-owned mobile network operator in Africa; Rainbow Rare Earths Ltd., which appointed Pham as a non-executive director in May 2021, and Ivanhoe Atlantic, the U.S. company developing the Kon Kweni iron ore resource in Guinea, of which he is non-executive chairman.

As an ordained Episcopal priest, Pham is a volunteer assistant at St. Paul's Parish, K Street, in Washington, D.C.

== Publications ==
Pham has written several books and several hundred articles, primarily on African history, politics and economics.

- "Africa in the Second Trump Administration" (The Jerusalem Strategic Tribune, 2024)
- "Getting Real about Critical Minerals" (The National Interest, 2024)
- "Without Africa, Biden's Energy Policies are a Win for China" (The National Interest, 2024)
- "China's Middle East Marathon" (The Jerusalem Strategic Tribune, 2023)
- The Good and Bad Continuity of Biden's New Africa Strategy (with Samuel B. Millner; The National Interest, 2022)
- After the Accords: How the Biden Administration Can Bolster Israeli-Moroccan Ties (with Samuel B. Millner; The National Interest, 2022)
- A Measured US Strategy for the New Africa (with James L. Jones; Atlantic Council Strategy Papers, 2017)
- State Collapse, Insurgency, and Counterinsurgency: Lessons from Somalia (Didactic Press, 2015)
- India in Africa: Implications of an Emerging Power for Africom and U. S. Strategy (Strategic Studies Institute, 2011)
- Africa: Mapping New Boundaries in International Law (coauthor, Hart Publishing, 2007)
- Child Soldiers, Adult Interests: Global Dimensions of the Sierra Leonean Tragedy (Nova Publishers, 2005)
- Liberia: Portrait of a Failed State (Reed Press, 2004)

For a number of years, Pham also wrote a weekly syndicated column on African security issues and American interests, "Strategic Interests", which is distributed by the World Defense Review, and in recent years has contributed to various online sources such as The Hill, Huffington Post, and U.S. News & World Report.
