= Duchesne High School (Missouri) =

High school in St. Charles, Missouri, US

Location
- 2550 Elm Street; St. Charles, Missouri 63301; United States; 38°47′52″N 90°30′1″W

Information
- Type: Private college-preparatory school
- Motto: Shaping leaders in mind, body, and spirit
- Religious affiliation: Roman Catholic
- Established: 1956; 70 years ago
- President: Paul Boschert
- Principal: Kurt Schneider
- Grades: 9–12
- Gender: Coeducational
- Enrollment: 247 (2025–26)
- Average class size: 20
- Student to teacher ratio: 14:1
- Colors: Royal blue and white
- Athletics conference: Archdiocesan Athletic Association
- Nickname: Pioneers
- Rival: St. Dominic High School
- Accreditation: Cognia
- Newspaper: The Pioneer Press
- Tuition: $14,250 (2026–27)
- Website: duchesne-hs.org

Duchesne High School is a private, coeducational, Catholic high school in St. Charles, Missouri, USA, in the Archdiocese of Saint Louis. The name commemorates St. Rose Philippine Duchesne, whose pioneering spirit was the driving force behind her missionary work throughout the region. Duchesne is classified as a regional high school by the Archdiocese of St. Louis, which means that certain parishes are "assigned" to this school as the primary areas served.

Duchesne High School was established as St. Peter High School in 1924. The school moved to its current location in 1956 and was renamed Duchesne Catholic High School.

== Athletics ==
Duchesne is a member of the Archdiocesan Athletic Association and of the Missouri State High School Activities Association (MSHSAA).

Varsity teams have earned 76 conference titles, 87 district titles, have made 56 appearances in the state final four (up to 2009), and have won 15 state championships. The girls' soccer team won its sixth overall state title in 2019 (their 5th state title in 7 years) as well as the conference and district titles. The girls' soccer team has also won State Championships in 2009, 2013, 2014, 2015, and 2016.

The following MSHSAA-sponsored sports are available to Duchesne students:

- American football (men) – freshman, junior varsity and varsity
- Baseball (men) – freshman, junior varsity and varsity
- Basketball (men & women) – freshman, junior varsity and varsity
- Cheerleading (women & men) – junior varsity and varsity
- Cross Country (men & women) – junior varsity and varsity
- Danceline (women & men) – varsity
- Golf (men & women) – junior varsity and varsity
- Soccer (men & women) – freshman, junior varsity and varsity
- Softball (women) – junior varsity and varsity
- Swimming (women) – varsity
- Tennis (men & women) – junior varsity and varsity
- Track & Field (men & women) – junior varsity and varsity
- Volleyball (women) – freshman, junior varsity and varsity
- Volleyball (men) – junior varsity and varsity

Duchesne also has a championship hockey team but it operates separately from the other interscholastic sports offered. On March 11, 2020, led by Jack Johnsen (Captain), Jack Boschert, Kevin Burke, and Derek Cagle (Alternate Captain), the Duchesne hockey team captured its first Wickenheiser Cup Championship in a 3–1 win over Oakville. Duchesne also recently won a cup game against rivals Saint Dominic in an annual game called the Catholic Cup. On December 26, 2025, the Duchesne Pioneers defeated the Saint Dominic Crusaders 3-1 to claim the cup on the backs of goals from Dylan Slattery, Owen Kelsey and Ryan Adkerson while goalie Quinn Meyer made 35 saves.

== Traditions ==
=== Prayer to St. Rose Philippine Duchesne ===
Philippine Duchesne,

You were a pioneer woman, called to join a pioneer endeavor - to explore, to begin, to expand the educational frontiers of a new world.
Each of us, as a Duchesne Pioneer, asks that, through your intercession, we be able to face our 'frontiers' and meet the challenge of being 'pioneers.' As boundaries appear before us, help us to step gently over despair and fashion a resurrection realm, a hope-hallowed world.
Help us follow your model, as we strive for a world which we cannot explain, risk our lives to find new life, challenge social patterns which give false comfort, enter the Heart of the One who is Beginning and End, share in the restlessness of the Spirit, and become instruments of peace.

Amen.

This prayer is said every Monday morning to begin the school week. The leader reads the first segment and the whole student body joins in at "Each of us..."

=== End of the day prayer ===
May the Lord bless and keep you.

May the Lord look kindly upon you and give you his peace. St. Damien DeVeuster pray for us; St. Katharine Drexel pray for us; St. Issac Jogues pray for us; St. Kateri Tekakwitha pray for us; and St. Rose Philippine Duchesne pray for us.

Amen.

== Notable alumni ==
- Dan Borgmeyer, mayor of St. Charles, Missouri since 2019
- Tom Heintzelman, MLB player for the St. Louis Cardinals and San Francisco Giants
- Brandon Joyce, UFL and CFL player
- Tony Lovasco, Missouri state representative since 2019
- Tara Osseck, Miss Missouri 2009, and Miss America 2010 contestant
- Scott T. Rupp, Missouri state senator from 2006–2014 and Missouri state representative from 2003–2006
- Randy Santel, competitive eater
