= Charles Phillips (businessman) =

American business executive (born 1959)

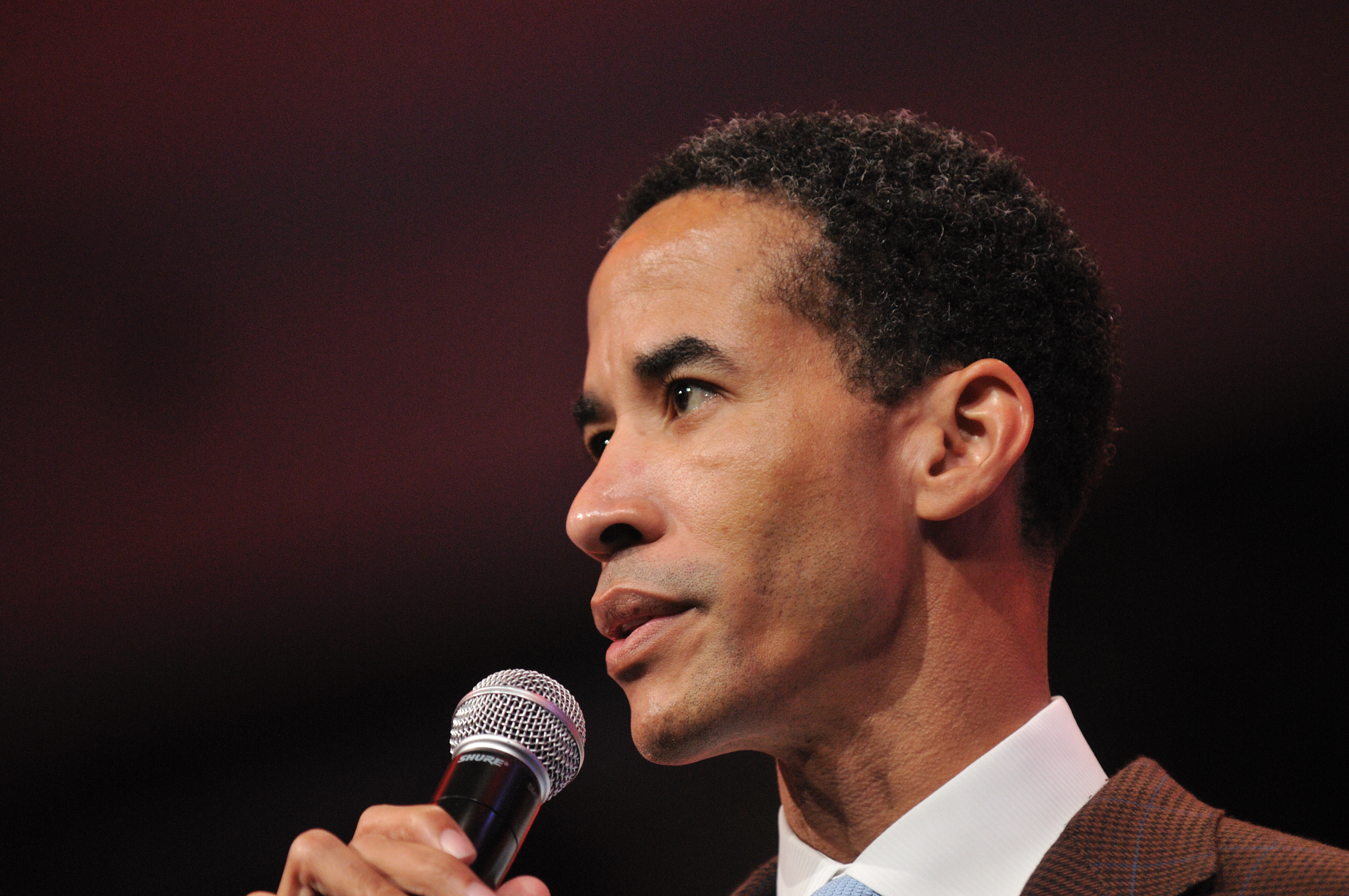
- Born: Charles Edward Phillips Jr. 1959 (age 66–67); Little Rock, Arkansas, U.S.
- Education: United States Air Force Academy (BS); Hampton University (MBA); New York Law School (JD)
- Occupations: Chairman and Former CEO of Infor

Charles E. Phillips (born June 1959) is an American business executive in the tech industry. He is the co-founder of Recognize, a focused investment firm. From 2010 to 2019, he was the CEO of Infor, a company that specializes in enterprise software applications for specific industries.

In his first three years as CEO of Infor, Phillips grew the company significantly through numerous strategic acquisitions, created an in-house design agency to improve software user interface and visual appeal, and updated and upgraded software to better meet niche-industry needs. In 2014, he led Infor to become the first industry cloud company – the first ERP vendor in the cloud offering complete software products for businesses and unique sub-industries – and by 2018 Infor was also the first ERP provider to make a complete transition to the cloud, with the majority of its customers, applications, and revenues cloud-based. In August 2019 he stepped down as CEO to "focus on strategy development, customer relationships, and new acquisitions", as Infor's Chairman.

Prior to joining Infor, Phillips was co-president and director of Oracle Corporation from 2003 through 2010, and a managing director in the investment banking technology group at Morgan Stanley from 1994 to 2003. He is also a director at Viacom Corporation.

== Early life and education ==
Charles E. Phillips Jr. was born in June 1959 in Little Rock, Arkansas, where his father was stationed in the Air Force. During his childhood his family moved often from state to state, and to Europe as well.

Phillips was fascinated by computers and technology from an early age, and spent his spare time during high school building computers. His father expected at least one of his four sons to join the Air Force, and Phillips enrolled at the United States Air Force Academy in Colorado Springs, Colorado, and earned a BS in computer science in 1981. When his eyesight did not meet the rigorous standard to be a pilot, he accepted a commission in the Marines. He joined as a second lieutenant, rising to the rank of captain, and was stationed at Camp Lejeune in Jacksonville, North Carolina, where he worked on computer systems.

Phillips obtained an MBA from Hampton University in 1986. He also attended New York Law School, obtaining a JD in 1993. In 2015 he received an honorary Doctor of Science from City University of New York's New York City College of Technology.

== Career ==
=== Early career ===
From 1981 to 1986, Phillips was in the U.S. Marine Corps in the 2nd Battalion, 10th Marines artillery unit at Camp Lejeune in Jacksonville, North Carolina, managing computer systems. He had joined as a Second Lieutenant and rose through the ranks to become a captain.

Phillips began his civilian career in 1986, and he and his wife Karen moved to New York, where his wife had relatives. He joined BNY Mellon as vice president of Software, and was at the company for four years. He then transferred to SoundView Technology Group, where he was senior vice president from 1990 through 1993, and Kidder Peabody, where he was senior vice president from 1990 through 1994.

In 1994, he joined Morgan Stanley as an enterprise software-industry analyst in the investment banking technology group, and he was promoted to managing director, a role in which he served through 2003.

Phillips spent his time on Wall Street nurturing relationships with hedge funders, venture capitalists, private equity executives, technology CEOs, and other business and financial leaders, and gained a reputation for being one of the most aggressive, connected, influential, and prolific technology investment analysts. Institutional Investor ranked him the number one Enterprise Software Industry Analyst for ten consecutive years, from 1994 to 2003.

=== Oracle ===
Among Phillip's industry contacts during his Wall Street years was Oracle Corporation CEO Larry Ellison, who invited him to join Oracle in 2003. Phillips accepted, and served as co-president and director of Oracle from 2003 to 2010.

Phillips led Oracle's field organization, and during his tenure he oversaw the company's revenue growth of nearly 300%. He also played a key role in Oracle's long series of acquisitions of 70 companies, including PeopleSoft, BEA Systems, Hyperion Solutions, and Siebel Systems, among others. Responsible for Oracle's sales and acquisitions, he utilized his networking, negotiation, and closing skills, and became one of the highest-profile African-Americans in the technology industry in the mid-2000s. In 2007, InformationWeek called him "Oracle's Secret Weapon". After seven years growing the company, Phillips resigned from Oracle in September 2010.

=== Infor ===
==== 2010–2013 ====
In October 2010 Phillips was announced as CEO of Infor, the world's third largest provider of enterprise applications and services, and the world's largest privately owned software company. He was joined by several high-ranking Oracle executives. Within four months of being hired, he led Infor's $2 billion acquisition of Lawson Software, a competitor focused on the health care industry, and continued Infor's acquisitions at the rate of two or more per year. In October 2011, Phillips moved Infor's headquarters from the Atlanta suburb of Alpharetta, Georgia to New York City's Silicon Alley.

He immediately set about re-directing Infor and its efforts, instilling a corporate culture of camaraderie, goodwill, and reward. He also focused Infor on excellent design and product coherence, establishing product usability and highly attractive modern interface as key components in Infor's software lines. To optimize user experience design, Phillips and his team formed Hook & Loop, an internal creative agency of writers, designers, developers, and filmmakers who develop software that is beautiful and user-friendly and has social-media type elements. Infor now maintains a design directive of "work is beautiful", and Hook & Loop is one of the largest digital design agencies in New York City.

To further differentiate Infor from its competitors, including Oracle and SAP, he focused Infor on niche acquisitions: smaller companies, and highly specialized divisions within large corporations that are applicable to "micro-verticals" or unique sub-industries. Under his direction Infor updated big industry-specific applications from older software languages to .Net and Java programming languages. Phillips also changed Infor's focus from building scale to innovation and products. He refocused Infor towards enhanced product integration, and to custom-creating and fine-tuning software for the specific needs of individual industries. Within three years of his leadership, Infor launched 300 new products and hired 1,500 new engineers. He also directed the company to open-source infrastructure.

==== 2014–present ====
In 2014 Phillips announced his intention for Infor to be the world's first industry cloud company – the first ERP vendor in the cloud offering complete software solutions for businesses and unique sub-industries. At the 2014 Amazon Web Services Summit, he gave the keynote address, and announced the launch of Infor CloudSuite, the first group of industry-specific application suites to be available on Amazon Web Services's cloud. In 2014 Infor also launched Dynamic Science Labs, located in Kendall Square on the Massachusetts Institute of Technology (MIT) campus, where a team of more than 70 PhD-level scientists develop applications for predictive analytics, machine learning, managing retail assortments, optimizing inventory, and planning segmented pricing for customers.

In October 2015 he launched Infor CloudSuite Retail, and Whole Foods became the first retailer to partner with Infor and utilize the suite.

Phillips continued to lead Infor's acquisitions, including the predictive talent-management software company PeopleAnswers (Talent Science) and the cloud-based CRM software Saleslogix in 2014, the cloud-based global trade, e-commerce, and supply-chain management network and platform GT Nexus in 2015, the retail predictive analytics provider Predictix and the retail software maker Starmount in 2016, the business intelligence specialist Birst in 2017, and the hospitality software maker Vivonet and the food-industry systems integrator Alfa-Beta Solutions in 2018. In 2017 Infor partnered with the marketing technology company Marketo, to jointly sell their products to companies in order to compete with sales and marketing software from Oracle, SAP, and Salesforce, and fully acquired IT consulting and services Ciber's Infor practice.

In 2016 Infor's in-house design agency that Phillips created in 2012, Hook & Loop, expanded to launch H&L Digital, which offers "digital-as-a service", working directly with customers to create end-to-end digital cloud solutions by strategizing, designing, assembling, and running client-specific software.

Beginning in 2015 he also focused Infor on networking different businesses and on analytics. This, in addition to his focus on artificial intelligence and machine learning, culminated in 2017 in the creation of Coleman AI, an artificial-intelligence platform named for Katherine Coleman Goble Johnson. Coleman AI allows Infor to leverage business data captured by its applications to provide predictive analytics, optimizations, industry benchmarks, and correlations; it was launched in 2018.

To develop more talent for the company, in 2014 he instituted Infor's Education Alliance Program, sponsoring courses at higher-education institutions which offer certifications on Infor's software suites plus opportunities for internships and other trainings that help students develop skills for careers in the tech industry. By 2017 the initiative had programs in 25 colleges in the U.S., and programs in China, India, Korea, and Thailand.

Under Phillips' leadership, by 2018 Infor became the first ERP provider to make a complete transition to the cloud, utilizing a model of multi-tenant, industry-specific software as a service (SaaS) CloudSuites.

Much of Infor's 2017–2018 expansion and innovation was fueled by a more than $2 billion investment from Koch Industries in early 2017; their company Georgia Pacific had been a longtime Infor customer. Koch Industries made a further investment of $1.5 billion in Infor in early 2019.

In late 2018, Phillips led Infor to team with #YesWeCode to form GenOne, an initiative to increase the diversity of the tech workforce.

In August 2019, Phillips became chairman of the Board and was succeeded by his CFO Kevin Samuelson in the CEO role. As Chairman Phillips will "focus on strategy development, customer relationships, and new acquisitions".

== Advisorships and philanthropy ==
Phillips has been on the board of directors of Viacom since 2004. He has been on the board of managers of Infor's subsidiary SoftBrands Holdings since December 2011. He is on the board of directors of Business Executives for National Security (BENS), the Posse Foundation, and the United States Air Force Academy Endowment. In the arts, he is on the board of directors of Jazz at Lincoln Center, and is vice chairman of the board of directors of the Apollo Theater. He is a member of Business Roundtable.

He is on the board of trustees of New York Law School, New York City Police Foundation, and the American Museum of Natural History. In 2017 he was appointed to the advisory board of the Transit Innovation Partnership, a public-private initiative launched by the Metropolitan Transportation Authority and the Partnership for New York City.

Phillips is on the International Advisory Board of Banco Santander, and he has been a Class B Director of the Federal Reserve Bank of New York since January 2018. He is a member of the Council on Foreign Relations.

He was a Democratic Party delegate from New York in 2004. In February 2009, Phillips was appointed as a member to the President's Economic Recovery Advisory Board to provide President Barack Obama and his administration with advice and counsel in addressing the late-2000s recession. In 2017 he was a lead organizer of a new political action committee (PAC), which became the Black Economic Alliance in 2018; the PAC aims to help elect representatives who will vigorously push an economic agenda for African Americans, and Phillips is on its board of directors.

Phillips has made large contributions to non-profits, schools, community groups, and civic groups. In 2010, he combined several of his charities into the Phillips Charitable Organization (PCO), a non-profit foundation. PCO's primary focus is on helping single parents, wounded veterans, and students working towards engineering, science, technology, or mathematics degrees. PCO is a major backer of Harlem Village Academies.

== Honors ==
- Institutional Investor's #1 Enterprise Software Industry Analyst (1994–2003)
- Black Enterprise's "Top 50 African Americans on Wall Street" (2002)
- Black Enterprise's "75 Most Powerful African Americans in Corporate America" (2005)
- Arkansas Black Hall of Fame (2012)
- Business Insider's "46 Most Important African-Americans In Technology" (2013)
- Savoy Magazine's Top 100 Most Influential Blacks in Corporate America (2012–2014)
- Crain's 200 Most-Connected Business People in New York (2014)
- In 2016, Inside Philanthropy listed him among the Top 20 Philanthropists of Color
- The Perlmutter Award for Excellence in Global Business Leadership, from the Perlmutter Institute for Global Business Leadership at the Brandeis International Business School (2017)
- In 2017, Black Enterprise listed him among the 300 most powerful African American executives in corporate America

== Personal life ==
Phillips and his wife Karen, whom he met in high school and married after college, live in Manhattan. They are jointly involved in philanthropy, including in particular the Phillips Charitable Organization, which they founded together in 2010. They have a son, Chas.

In 2010, Phillips was the subject of a series of billboards in New York City, San Francisco, and Atlanta. The billboards included images of him with a mistress, YaVaughnie Wilkins, and the URL of a website that detailed their affair. Wilkins claimed that she bought the billboards for $250,000 and created the website after discovering that Phillips was married. Phillips confirmed that he had had an eight and half year extramarital affair with Wilkins, which had since ended.
