= Kneeland Youngblood =

American businessman (born 1955)

Kneeland Youngblood (born December 13, 1955) is an American physician, businessman, and political figure. He is the founding partner, Chairman & CEO of the private equity firm Pharos Capital Group, LLC. Pharos Capital Group, LLC focuses on providing later stage funding, generally for growth, acquisitions, and recapitalizations, to growing healthcare companies that lower costs, improve outcomes and expand access to care, especially in underserved regions. Youngblood is listed as a top bundler for Barack Obama.

== Early life and education ==
Youngblood was born in Galena Park, Texas. He became involved in politics at a young age, and was a page in the Texas State Legislature at age 14. Youngblood attended Princeton University and earned his Bachelor of Arts degree in political science/Science in Human Affairs in 1978. During his junior year, he studied a semester in Stockholm, Sweden and a semester in Oxford, England. Before he graduated (at the risk of expulsion) Youngblood participated in a sit-in calling for Princeton's divestment from South Africa under apartheid.

He attended the University of Texas, Southwestern Medical School at the University of Texas Southwestern Medical Center and earned his MD in 1982. He was a resident in Emergency Medicine at the Emory University School of Medicine from 1983 to 1985, training primarily at Grady Memorial Hospital. Youngblood worked in medicine from 1985 to 1997 as an emergency medicine physician at the Medical Center of Plano.

== Career ==
From 1993 to 1999, Youngblood served on the board of the Teacher Retirement System of Texas (TRS) as a trustee and chairman of the Fund's Real Estate Committee, directing asset allocations and managing the fund's $1.4 billion portfolio. In 1994, President Bill Clinton nominated Youngblood to the board of directors of the United States Enrichment Corporation (USEC). While on the board Youngblood traveled to Africa and met Nelson Mandela, which led him to write the essay "From Sit-in to Soweto." While with the Clinton administration, he also served on the Task Force on National Health Care Reform headed by First Lady Hillary Clinton.

In 1997, Youngblood, along with Michael Devlin and Robert Crants, founded Pharos Capital Group, LLC, a private equity firm.

Youngblood's other board memberships include or have included: Scientific Games, AMR Investments, Starwood, Burger King, Gap, Inc., and the Dallas, Texas Employee Retirement System. He is Director Emeritus of the U.S. Enrichment Corporation and iStar Financial, a NYSE-traded real estate investment trust (REIT). He is also a member of the Council on Foreign Relations.
