= Wing Bowl =

Once-yearly Buffalo Wing eating competition

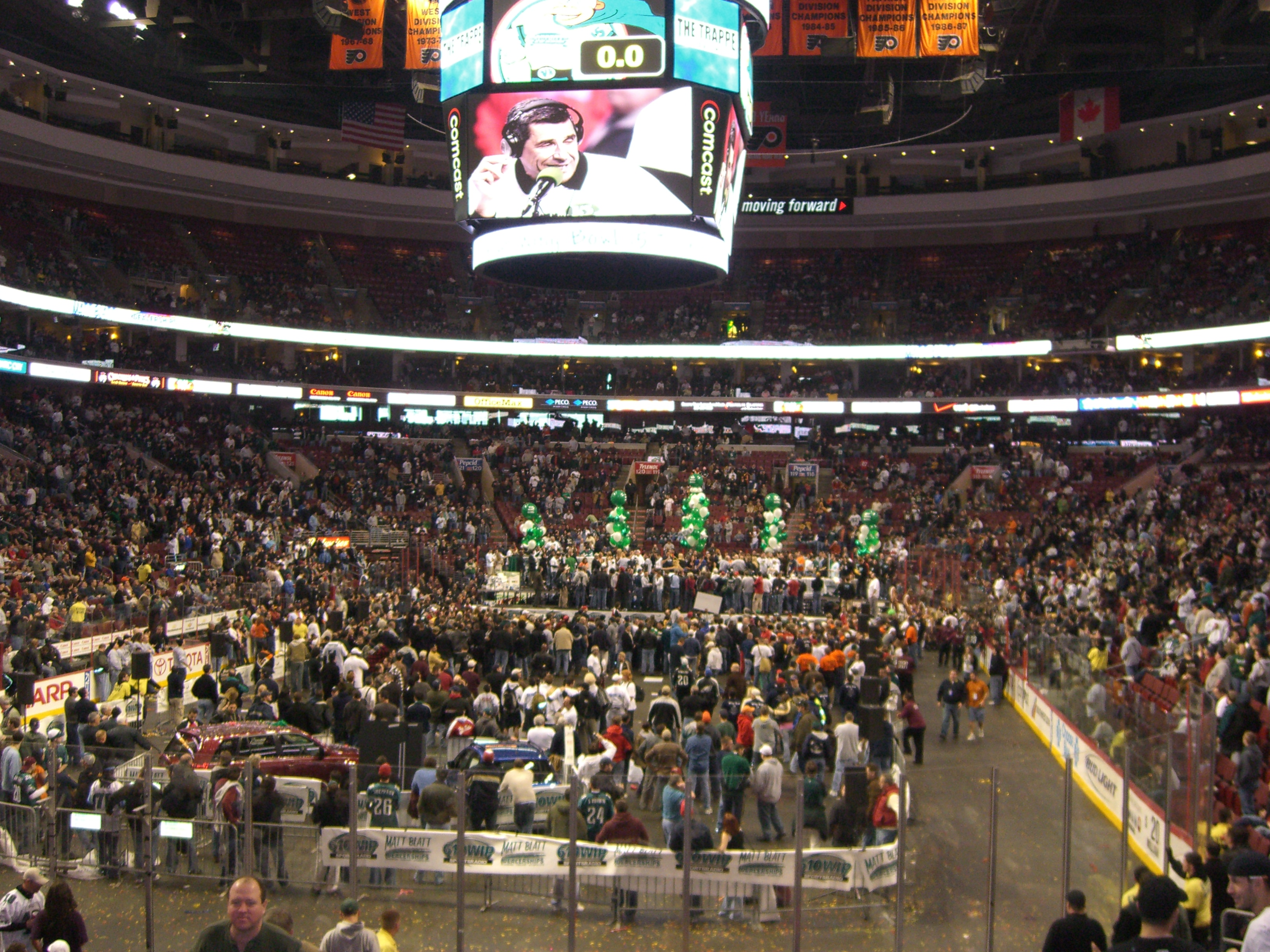
- Wing Bowl XV
- Status: Inactive
- Genre: Competitive eating competition
- Date: Friday before the Super Bowl
- Frequency: Ended
- Venue: Wells Fargo Center
- Location: Philadelphia
- Country: United States
- Inaugurated: January 29, 1993
- Founders: Al Morganti, Angelo Cataldi
- Most recent: February 2, 2018
- Attendance: 20,000+
- Leader: Commissioner - Jon Dorenbos
- People: Last champion - Molly Schuyler
- Sponsor: WTEL (AM)
- Website: wingbowlmovie.com

Wing Bowl was an annual eating contest founded in 1993 by Philadelphia talk-radio hosts Angelo Cataldi and Al Morganti. The contest was first broadcast on WIP.

About 150 people attended Wing Bowl I (held in a hotel) in 1993 to see a competition between two contestants. The event pitted competitive eaters in a Buffalo wing eating contest. The Wing Bowl was traditionally held on the Friday before the Super Bowl. The event, which began as a radio promotion, grew to encompass television, the Internet, and a contest for women who were termed "the Wingettes."

From 2000 to 2018, the event was held at Philadelphia's Wells Fargo Center, where they did live broadcasts on 94-WIP-FM. There were no television deals to broadcast the event live; however, a replay was usually shown on CW 57, Comcast SportsNet, or one of the other local stations within the following week. The Wing Bowl drew crowds of over 20,000.

The final Wing Bowl in Philadelphia, Wing Bowl XXVI was held on February 2, 2018, and the winner was Molly Schuyler, who devoured a record 501 wings in a half hour.

After a hiatus following Wing Bowl XXVI in 2018, the event is set to return on February 7, 2026, in Las Vegas at the Plaza Hotel & Casino. Reviving its legacy as a raucous and competitive eating spectacle, the event promises to blend the original Philly spirit with new Vegas energy. Officially titled Wing Bowl Las Vegas, the 2026 edition will feature 20 competitors battling for the crown in front of a live audience on Super Bowl Saturday weekend. A documentary called No One Died: The Wing Bowl Story, will be released on August 15, 2026 to stream on platforms such as Amazon, AppleTV and YouTube.

== Background ==
Wing Bowl was the brainchild of WIP radio host Al Morganti, who came up with the idea when it became apparent the Philadelphia Eagles were not going to make the Super Bowl anytime soon. It is also suggested that Morganti was fed up with the Buffalo Bills going to the Super Bowl and not winning. The first Wing Bowl was held in the lobby of the Wyndham Franklin Plaza Hotel in Center City, and was a small event featuring just two combatants. Joan Brewington, who arrived wearing a bathrobe and boxing gloves, punching the air like a prizefighter and began the tradition of competitive hoopla associated with the event. Carmen Cordero walked away with the inaugural title, receiving a hibachi as his prize.

Since then, media coverage has grown to the point where every one of the major Philadelphia television stations has covered the event. The ABC 6, CBS Channel 3 and Fox 29 affiliates all aired live reports from the event during their morning news. Features on the event have appeared in the Courier-Post, The Philadelphia Inquirer and Daily News as well as a host of newspapers in the surrounding counties. The event has been featured on ESPN and the syndicated television shows Real TV and The Montel Williams Show. Segments on Wing Bowl have appeared on TV newscasts in cities throughout the country. Several Wing Bowl contestants, including "El Wingador," competed in Fox's "Glutton Bowl" in the spring of 2002. The 2007 Wing Bowl was carried on Comcast Cable's On Demand channel.

Then Mayor of Philadelphia and future Governor of Pennsylvania Ed Rendell attended Wing Bowls II, III, IV and VI, where he presented the winner with a "Liberty Bell" trophy. Other celebrities who have appeared include retired heavyweight boxer Randall "Tex" Cobb, former 76ers President Pat Croce, former Phillies manager Larry Bowa, U.S. Senator Arlen Specter, and others. Major-league umpire Eric Gregg served as the "Commissioner" of Wing Bowl from its second year until his death from a stroke on 5 June 2006. From December 2006 to 2013, Pat Croce was the second commissioner. Jon Dorenbos served as the last commissioner from 2014, and served the final 5 editions.

== Qualifications ==
(As per Wing Bowl Commissioner Jon Dorenbos) Entry into Wing Bowl can be gained in two ways, the first of which is successfully performing an "eating stunt" on air during The Morning Show at the 94 WIP studios in Center City, Philadelphia, with Al Morganti as judge. Stunts have included eating 20 cups (~4,800 mL) of cooked oatmeal, eating 3.75 pounds (1.70 kg) of creamed spinach with 3.75 pounds (1.70 kg) of hot sauce, and eating five Big Macs. The stunt must be completed within a time limit negotiated between the contestant and Morganti. Morganti, known to be a tough judge, has disallowed stunts that involved what he considers "cheating", such as dipping bread into a beverage to make it easier to swallow, or breaking up a food item into constituent parts for easier chewing (such as separating hot dogs from their buns). He is also tough on contestants who suggest a stunt involving liquid consumption; The Morning Show hosts prefer eating stunts over drinking stunts. If a person offers to perform a drinking stunt, it must be compelling to the hosts, such as Wing Bowl XIV champion Joey Chestnut's offer to drink 1 US gallon (3.8 L) of milk. The hosts deemed it not difficult enough, but, fortunately for Chestnut, former champion Bill "El Wingador" Simmons was present and declared the stunt to have a high level of difficulty, upon which the hosts accepted his offer, with a five-minute time limit to complete the challenge.

The other way to gain entry to Wing Bowl is to win a "Wingoff." A "Wingoff" is a 10-minute eating contest held at a Philadelphia or South Jersey bar hosted by former Philadelphia Eagle and WIP Host Hugh Douglas and WIP Personality Marc Farzetta. The "Wingoffs" began in 2005 when 610 WIP decided to spoof the Big 5 Philadelphia area universities basketball teams. The winner of these "Wingoffs" gain automatic entry into the Wing Bowl.

== Cancellation ==
WIP announced on October 30, 2018, that event was being canceled after 26 years because the time for doing so felt right after the Eagles won Super Bowl LII. According to WIP program director Spike Eskin, "When Wing Bowl started ... a large part of it was the lead-up to the Super Bowl never involved the Eagles. We just wanted to get to the promised land."

== Champions ==
Wing Bowl	Date	Venue	Winner	Wings	Runner-up	Wings
I	January 1, 1993	Wyndham Franklin Plaza Hotel	Carmen "The Beast From the East" Cordero	100		
II	January 28, 1994	The Main Event	Kevin "Heavy Keavy" O'Donnell	127		
III	January 1, 1995	Club Egypt	Kevin "Heavy Keavy" O'Donnell	133		
IV	January 26, 1996	Electric Factory	Glen "Fluffmaster" Garrison	155		
V	January 24, 1997	Electric Factory	Eric "Gentleman E" Behl	120		
VI	January 30, 1998	First Union Spectrum	Mark "Big Rig" Vogeding	164		
VII	January 29, 1999	First Union Spectrum	Bill "El Wingador" Simmons	113		
VIII	January 28, 2000	Wells Fargo Center	"Tollman Joe" Paul	90		
IX	January 26, 2001	Wells Fargo Center	Bill "El Wingador" Simmons	137		
X	February 1, 2002	Wells Fargo Center	Bill "El Wingador" Simmons	135		
XI	January 24, 2003	Wells Fargo Center	Bill "El Wingador" Simmons	154	Rich "The Gavone" Sica	129
XII	January 30, 2004	Wells Fargo Center	Sonya "The Black Widow" Thomas	167	Ed "Cookie" Jarvis	153
XIII	February 4, 2005	Wells Fargo Center	Bill "El Wingador" Simmons	162	Sonya "The Black Widow" Thomas	161
XIV	February 3, 2006	Wells Fargo Center	Joey Chestnut	173	Rich "The Locust" LeFevre	151
XV	February 2, 2007	Wells Fargo Center	Joey Chestnut	182	Patrick Bertoletti	170
XVI	February 1, 2008	Wells Fargo Center	Joey Chestnut	241	Patrick Bertoletti	227
XVII	January 30, 2009	Wells Fargo Center	Jonathan "Super" Squibb	203	"Not Rich"	180
XVIII	February 5, 2010	Wells Fargo Center	Jonathan "Super" Squibb	238	"Not Rich"	145
XIX	February 4, 2011	Wells Fargo Center	Jonathan "Super" Squibb	255	Bill "El Wingador" Simmons	254
XX	February 3, 2012	Wells Fargo Center	Takeru Kobayashi	337	Jonathan "Super" Squibb	271
XXI	February 1, 2013	Wells Fargo Center	Jamie "The Bear" McDonald	287	Jonathan "Super" Squibb	282
XXII	January 31, 2014	Wells Fargo Center	Molly Schuyler	363	Patrick Bertoletti	356
XXIII	January 30, 2015	Wells Fargo Center	Patrick Bertoletti	444	Molly Schuyler	440
XXIV	February 5, 2016	Wells Fargo Center	Molly Schuyler	429	Patrick Bertoletti	409
XXV	February 3, 2017	Wells Fargo Center	Bob "Notorious B.O.B." Shoudt	409	David T. "Wings & Things" Brunelli	386
XXVI	February 2, 2018	Wells Fargo Center	Molly Schuyler	501	David T. "Wings & Things" Brunelli	396

== Past Wing Bowls ==
=== 2007 - Wing Bowl XV ===
Wing Bowl 15 is known as "Philadelphia Against The World". Tickets sold out on the first day of sales. Wing Bowl 15 was presented by Philadelphia Park Casino. Pat Croce was this year's Wing Bowl Commissioner. Pat took the helm after the tragic loss of WIP's dear friend Eric Gregg.

=== 2008 - Wing Bowl XVI ===
Going into Wing Bowl 16, WIP Host Angelo Cataldi billed it as the greatest Wing Bowl ever. With El Wingador coming out of retirement to square off against the number one eater in the world, Joey Chestnut. Wing Bowl 16 also featured a change in chicken wing providers, which contributed to the shattering of the elusive 200 wing mark.

=== 2009 - Wing Bowl XVII ===
Unlike the past years in which professional eaters were allowed to participate, Wing Bowl 17 on January 30, 2009, at the Wachovia Center, was an all Amateur eater event, promoting eaters from the local neighborhoods in and around the Philadelphia area. There are 25 eaters in Wing Bowl 17, with Wing Bowl 8 Champion "Tollman Joe" participating. This marks the first occasion that Wing Bowl creator Al Morganti gave a special dispensation that Tollman Joe did not have to perform an eating stunt to be in the Wing Bowl field, since he has been the only amateur to beat Bill "El Wingador" Simmons.

Jonathan "Super" Squibb of Winslow Twp., NJ, took the Wing Bowl 17 title of Wing Bowl Champion by eating 203 wings.

=== 2010 - Wing Bowl XVIII ===
Wing Bowl 18 took place on February 5, 2010. Jonathan Squibb finished with a total of 238 wings to win his second Wing Bowl in a row. Squibb finished 93 wings ahead of the second-place finisher and won a Ford F-150 truck and a championship ring as prizes.

=== 2011 - Wing Bowl XIX ===
Jonathan Squibb won for the third consecutive year by 255 eating wings to win Wing Bowl 19. Squibb's total broke the record of 241 wings set by Joey Chestnut at Wing Bowl 16 (2008) and was one wing more than second-place finisher Bill "El Wingador" Simmons was able to eat. Squibb won $20,000 in cash and 2011 Dodge Ram truck.

=== 2012 - Wing Bowl XX ===
Takeru Kobayashi set a new competition record by eating 337 wings to win Wing Bowl 20. Kobayashi's total was 82 wings more than the previous competition record set by Jonathan Squibb. Squibb also broke his own record, but finished in second with 271 wings. Kobayashi won $20,000 in cash and a championship ring as prizes.

=== 2013 - Wing Bowl XXI ===
Wing Bowl 21 was won by James McDonald who ate a total of 287 wings. McDonald finished five wings ahead of three-time champion Jonathan Squibb to win $20,000 in cash and a $7,500 championship diamond ring.

=== 2014 - Wing Bowl XXII ===
Molly Schuyler won Wing Bowl 22 by eating a total of 363 wings. Schuyler's total broke the previous record of 337 set at Wing Bowl 20 by Takeru Kobayashi. Patrick Bertoletti finished second with 356 wings. Schuyler received the $22,000 top prize for her win.

=== 2015 - Wing Bowl XXIII ===
The winner of Wing Bowl 23 was Patrick Bertoletti. Bertoletti ate 444 wings to set a new Wing Bowl record and finished four wings ahead of defending champion Molly Schuyler. Bertoletti received a Harley Davidson Fat Boy motorcycle, $10,000 in cash, and a one-of-a-kind commemorative ring for winning.

=== 2016 - Wing Bowl XXIV ===
Molly Schuyler won Wing Bowl 24 with a total of 429 wings to finish 21 wings ahead of second-place finisher Patrick Bertoletti. Schuyler won a 2016 Harley Davidson Fat Boy motorcycle, $10,000 in cash, and a custom made Wing Bowl 24 championship ring as prizes.

=== 2017 - Wing Bowl XXV ===
Bob "Notorious B.O.B." Shoudt won Wing Bowl 25 with a count of 409 wings to finish ahead of David T. "Wings & Things" Brunelli by 23 wings. Celebrity guests included actor/rapper, Coolio and former pro-wrestler, Ric Flair. Shoudt won $10,000 in cash, a Hyundai Santa Fe, a ring and a medal as prizes. In total the $50,000 worth of prizes was the largest amount ever won in an open, qualifying, eating contest.

=== 2018 - Wing Bowl XXVI ===
Molly Schuyler broke her own record and devoured an event-record 501 wings to win the title. She received $5,000, a 2018 Hyundai Sonata, a ring and medal. "Wings & Things" was 2nd, 105 behind her.

== See also ==
- Competitive eating
