= Morgan DeBaun =

American entrepreneur and corporate advisor

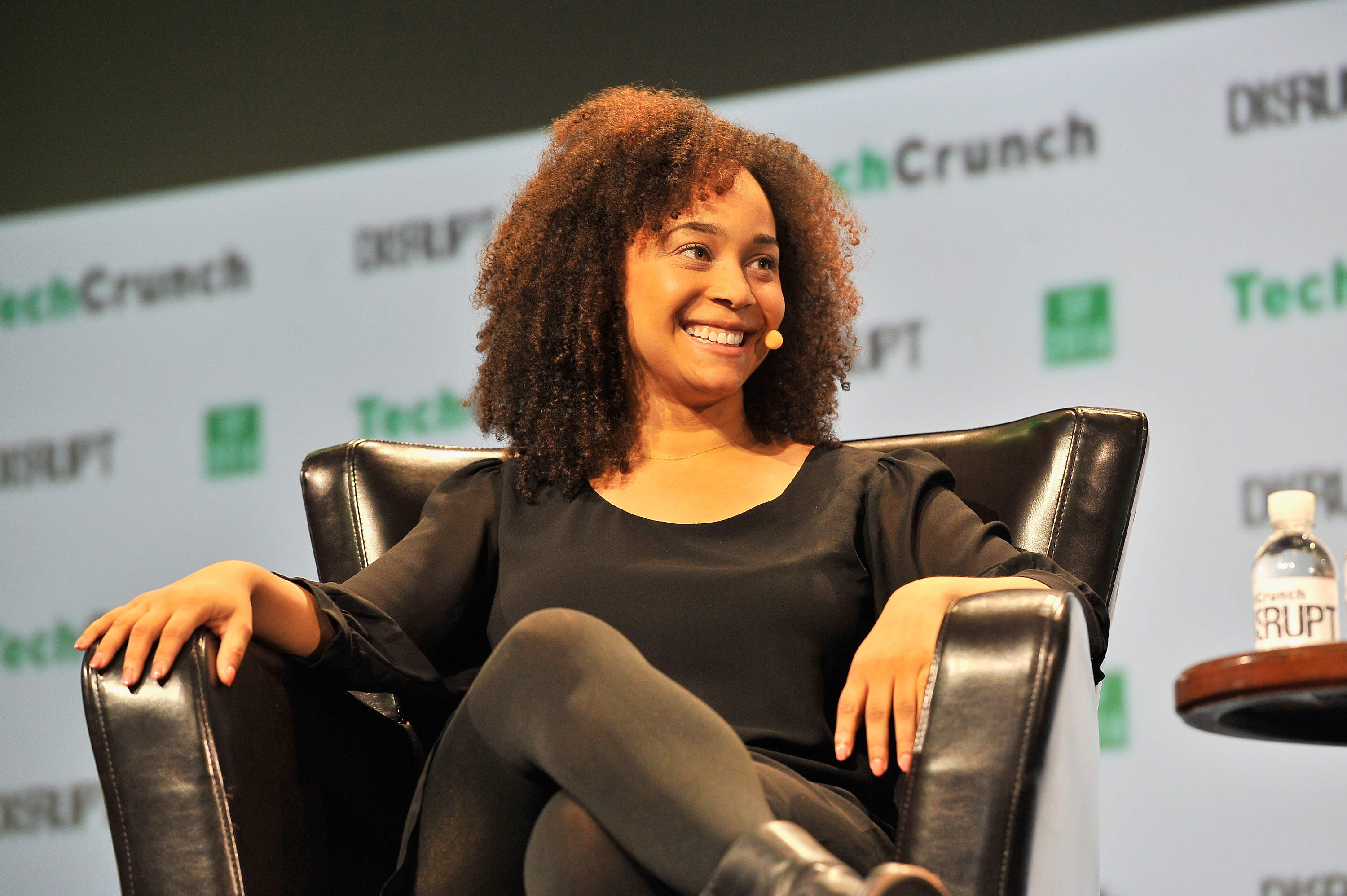
- DeBaun in 2016
- Born: 1990 (age 35–36); St. Louis, Missouri
- Education: Washington University in St. Louis (BA)
- Occupation: Entrepreneur
- Website: morgandebaun.com

Morgan DeBaun (born 1990) is an African American serial entrepreneur and corporate advisor. She is the Founder and CEO of Blavity Inc., a digital media company for Black culture.

== Early life and education ==
DeBaun was born in St. Louis, Missouri. Her father was a pediatrician at Washington University. While living in a predominantly white suburban neighborhood, her family surrounded her with positive black role models. For middle school, She attended a magnet school in the city, so she could be around more children like herself. In high school, she attended the Catholic all-girls Rosati-Kain Academy in the Central West End neighborhood of St. Louis.

DeBaun showed an interest in business at an early age. She sold sugary snacks to her fellow students in their middle school that lacked vending machines, and she learned about investing from her father at age 14.

She came up with the idea of Blavity Inc. while attending Washington University in St. Louis. Black students there would sit together at lunch and talk for hours. She referred to this gathering of African-American students as Black Gravity, or Blavity.

== Career ==
DeBaun began her career working on product management and business development at Intuit. She kept her full time job at Intuit but was spending all her nights and weekends working on Blavity. She ultimately left Intuit and committed to Blavity full time due to her dissatisfaction with the media coverage of Michael Brown's death.

DeBaun cofounded Blavity with Aaron Samuels and Jeff Nelson in 2014. They started with a curated video newsletter and built a website, which was only the beginning. The site features content created by and for young black Americans, including subjects such as the Black Lives Matter movement and protests of the National Anthem.

The news site has grown into a digital ecosystem with a monthly reach of over 100 million people and over 100 corporate partners per year. Their portfolio of brands includes Blavity News, AfroTech, Travel Noire, Shadow and Act, 21Ninety and Lunchtable. Their conferences include Summit21 for Black women creators and AfroTech, the largest tech conference connecting a global community of 20,000+ Black tech innovators through a series of digital and in-person events.

In 2021, Blavity Inc. launched Blavity.org, a 501(c)(3) nonprofit, with the mission to drive Black economic advancement forward through entrepreneurial fellowship programs featuring grants, education & mentorship.

DeBaun is one of few African-American female founders that have raised more than $1 million in venture capital. As of June 2021, DeBaun had raised $12 million for Blavity, Inc.

DeBaun additionally acts as an advisor to influential global brands and companies including Disney, American Airlines, CES, and Pantora Bridal and often partners Blavity with big brands to help them authentically reach Black audiences.

DeBaun is also the creator of WorkSmart, a business podcast and small business advising program and founder of M Roze Essentials and Growth Notebook. DeBaun also advises entrepreneurs and start up founders in her WorkSmart Program.

== Awards and recognition ==
- 2016 – Forbes 30 Under 30 list of "young people transforming the future of media"
- 2016 – The Root 100 list of the 100 most influential African Americans
- 2016 – MVMT50 Top 10 Innovators of the Year
- 2018 – Forbes' America's Top 50 Women In Tech
- 2019 - Culture Creators Innovators & Leaders Technology Award
- 2020 - Dot.LA Rising Entrepreneur
