= Z-Burger =

American fast-food chain

Z-Burger is an American fast-food chain based in Washington, D.C. It is owned by Peter Tabibian. It runs an annual eating contest.
