= St. Francis Borgia High School =

Catholic secondary school in Washington, Missouri

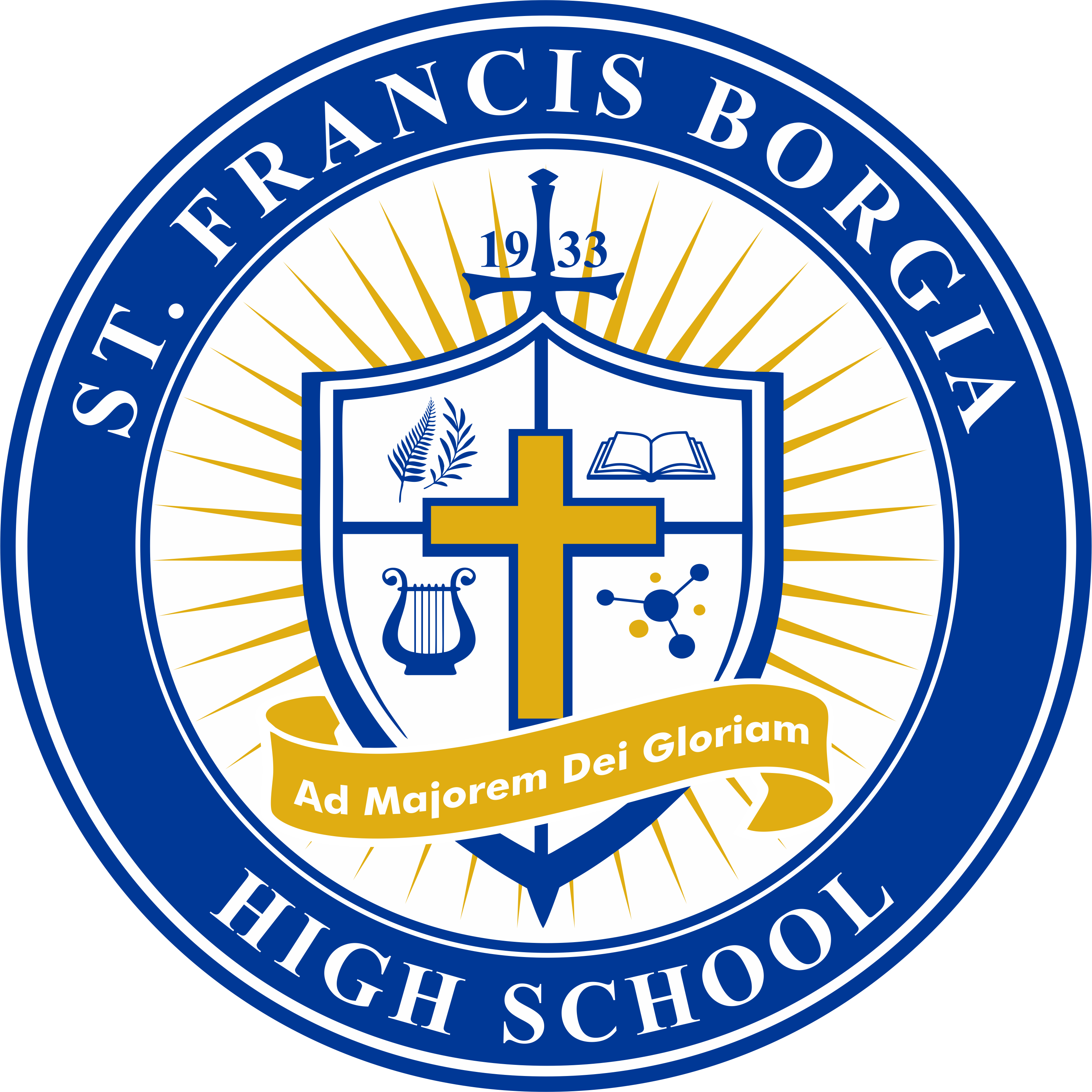

Location
- 1000 Borgia Drive; Washington, Missouri 63090; United States; 38°33′1″N 91°1′32″W

Information
- Type: Private co-ed school
- Motto: Latin: Ad majorem Dei gloriam (For the greater glory of God)
- Religious affiliation: Roman Catholic
- Patron saint: St. Francis Borgia
- Established: 1933; 93 years ago
- Oversight: Archdiocese of St. Louis
- President: Matt Schutte
- Principal: Pam (Ruether) Tholen '02
- Chaplain: Fr. Donald Morris
- Grades: 9–12
- Enrollment: 441 (2023)
- Colors: Blue and gold
- Slogan: We Are Borgia
- Nickname: Knights
- Rivals: Washington High School; St. Dominic High School
- Accreditation: Cognia
- Publication: Knightline
- Yearbook: The Borgian
- News Production: The Knightly News Live
- ITS Troupe: 2787
- Website: borgia.com

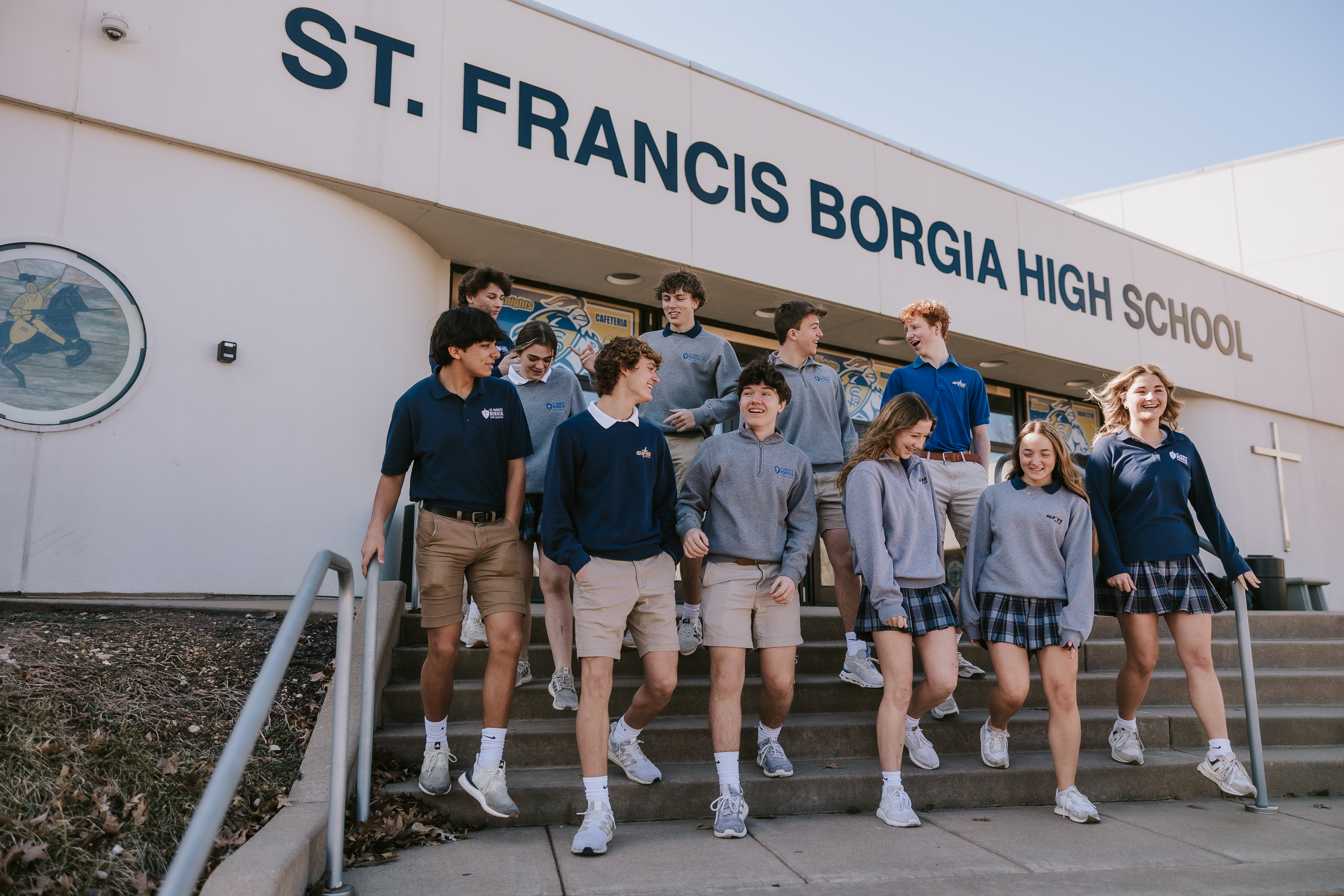
Front of school

St. Francis Borgia High School, known simply as Borgia, is a Roman Catholic secondary school in Washington, Franklin County, Missouri, established in 1933. As of 2023, its enrollment is 441 students.

== History ==
St. Francis Borgia High School dates back to 1901 when the school enrolled twenty-three students to further their education past the grade school level. In 1910 the school became a two-year Commercial School, and then in 1934 St. Francis Borgia officially became a four-year parish high school. As the school expanded and more students enrolled, a larger campus was needed. It went through four locations before finally settling in 1982 at current location near downtown Washington.

In 1985 over half of the student body came from outside of the Washington city limits. The growing number of students and more rigorous academic requirements made way for another expansion program which began in 1998. This included thirteen new classrooms, two remodeled science labs, remodeling and enlargement of the theater, chapel, and cafeteria, a weight room, an elevator, additional offices, and restrooms. In 2001 the high school was accredited as a college preparatory high school by the North Central Accrediting Association.

A new AstroTurf football field and a regulation-sized track were added to the facilities in the summer of 2010. In the 2012–13 school year, iPad technology was integrated into learning.

In 2015, a new multipurpose building was constructed near the existing gymnasium and connected with a covered walkway. It was named after past school president George Wingbermuehle.

== Academics ==
Borgia offers an eight-class block schedule. A student can earn up to 58 college credit hours through East Central College. The class sizes are small, with a school enrollment of 445 students.

== Athletics ==
The school often competes at the state level and has won a total of 23 MSHSAA state titles across 8 different sports:

- Baseball (1): 2019
- Boys’ basketball (5): 1993, 1994, 1998, 2006, 2009
- Boys' cross country (2): 1999, 2000
- Football (1): 1993
- Boys’ golf (2): 1999, 2012
- Boys’ soccer (1): 2022
- Boys' track and field (1): 2025
- Girls’ volleyball (11): 1987, 1988, 1989, 1990, 1992, 1993, 1995, 2000, 2004, 2013, 2019

Borgia has also earned state titles in non-MSHSAA activities:

- Starry Knights Dance Team (8): 2006, 2007, 2009 , 2010, 2011, 2012, 2013, 2014
- Knights Cheer Team (6): 2011, 2013, 2014, 2015, 2016, 2017

== Student life ==
Student clubs at Borgia include scholar bowl, National Honor Society, student council, art club, speech, Soul Singers, and Borgia on Stage Society. Religious groups include Campus Ministry and CLIF (Christ Leaders in Faith). There are also two language clubs, Spanish and German.

== Notable alumni ==
- Paige Hulsey (2008)
- Kyle Marquart (1981), Missouri state legislator
- Brock Olivo (1994), American football player and coach
- Matt Pickens (2000), soccer player and coach
- Jack Wagner (1978), actor
