= Blavity =

African-American culture blog

- Website type: New media and lifestyle for African Americans
- Available in: English
- Creators: Morgan DeBaun; Aaron Samuels
- Website: blavity.com
- Launched: July 2014; 12 years ago
- Current status: Online

Blavity is an American digital media company and website based in Los Angeles. Founded in 2014, it aims to serve black millennials.

== History ==
Blavity was founded by CEO Morgan DeBaun, Jonathan Jackson, Jeff Nelson, and Aaron Samuels in 2014; DeBaun left Intuit, where she had worked for three years, to found the company. Blavity's name is a combination of the words "black" and "gravity", a reference to the way black undergraduates at Washington University gravitated to the lunchtime cafeteria conversations between DeBaun and her friends. The company has said it aims to "economically and creatively support Black millennials across the African scape, so they can pursue the work they love, and change the world in the process."

In 2016, co-founders DeBaun and Samuels were named to the Forbes 30 Under 30 list of "young people transforming the future of America". Blavity launched two conferences: EmpowerHer, a conference in New York City for black women, and Afrotech, a San Francisco summit for black people in technology. By September 2016, Blavity was reaching millions of unique visitors per month. That month, the company closed a $1 million round of seed funding. An investor and mentor was African-American businesswoman Monique Woodard.

In 2017, Lihle Z. Mtshali wrote in Essence that the site, which had about 40% user-generated content, focused "on sub-cultures, community, and local happenings in different cities rather than covering celebrities and mainstream black culture."

In 2017, Blavity launched a black women's lifestyle platform, 21Ninety, and acquired the black entertainment website Shadow and Act and the black travel website Travel Noire.

In July 2018, Blavity raised $6.5 million through GV, Comcast Ventures, Plexo Capital, and Baron Davis Enterprises to enlarge the company's engineering group, which works on new content, and establish a new office in Atlanta.

In January 2023, Blavity launched Home and Texture, aimed at multicultural audiences buying homes, designing their spaces, and starting families.
