= List of Philadelphia Eagles broadcasters =

The first Philadelphia Eagles game was broadcast on October 22, 1939 on the experimental station W2XBS, the predecessor to WNBC. Beginning with the 2008 season, Eagles games were broadcast on both WYSP (now WIP-FM) and Sports Radio 610 WIP, as both stations were owned and operated by CBS Radio. Merrill Reese, who joined the Eagles in the mid-1970s, is the play-by-play announcer, and former Eagles wide receiver Mike Quick is the color analyst. Former Eagles linebacker Bill Bergey is among several Eagles post-game commentators on the FM.

Most preseason games are televised on WCAU, the local NBC owned and operated station. Television announcers for these preseason games are Scott Graham and Ross Tucker.

== Eagles radio announcers ==
Years	Flagship station	Play-by-play	Color commentator	Sideline reporter
1939	WCAU	Taylor Grant	Bob Hall and Harry McTique	
1940–41	WCAU	Byrum Saam	Bob Hall	
1942–44	WCAU	Byrum Saam	Chuck Thompson	
1945	WCAU	Byrum Saam	Claude Haring	
1946–49	WIBG	Byrum Saam	Claude Haring	
1950	WPEN	Franny Murray	Del Parks and Jules Rind	
1951	WCAU	Bill Sears		
1952–54	WCAU	Byrum Saam	Claude Haring	
1955	WCAU	Byrum Saam	Claude Haring and Bill Bransome	
1956	WCAU	Bill Campbell	Bill Bransome	
1957	WCAU	Bill Campbell	Bill Bransome and Ed Romance	
1958–59	WCAU	Bill Campbell	Bill Bransome	
1960	WCAU	Bill Campbell	Ed Harvey and Russ Hall	
1961	WCAU	Bill Campbell	Ed Harvey, Russ Hall, Jack Buck, or Tommy Roberts	
1962	WCAU	Bill Campbell	Bobby Thomason and Tom Brookshier	
1963	WCAU	Bill Campbell	Tom Brookshier	
1964	WCAU	Bill Campbell	Byrum Saam and Tom Brookshier	
1965	WCAU	Andy Musser	Charlie Gauer and Stan Hochman	
1966–67	WCAU	Andy Musser	Charlie Gauer and Ed Harvey	
1968	WCAU	Andy Musser	Charlie Gauer	
1969	WIP	Charlie Swift	Clarence Peaks and Thacher Longstreth	
1970	WIP	Charlie Swift	Al Pollard, Clarence Peaks, or Thacher Longstreth	
1971–76	WIP	Charlie Swift	Al Pollard	
1977	WIP	Charlie Swift; Merrill Reese	Merrill Reese; Herb Adderley	
1978–81	WIP	Merrill Reese	Jim Barniak	
1982	WIP	Merrill Reese	Jim Barniak and Bill Bergey	
1983	WIP	Merrill Reese	Bill Bergey	
1984–91	WIP	Merrill Reese	Stan Walters	
1992–97	WYSP	Merrill Reese	Stan Walters	
1998–2007	WYSP	Merrill Reese	Mike Quick	
2008–2014	WIP-AM/WTEL and WYSP/WIP-FM	Merrill Reese	Mike Quick	Howard Eskin
2015–2024	WIP-FM	Merrill Reese	Mike Quick	Howard Eskin
2024	WIP-FM	Merrill Reese	Mike Quick	Howard Eskin; Devan Kaney
2025	WIP-FM	Merrill Reese	Mike Quick	Devan Kaney
2026	WIP-FM	Merrill Reese	Mike Quick	
