= Bill Werndl =

American Sports Broadcaster

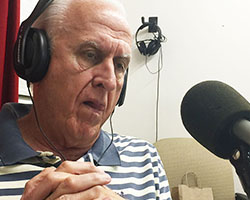
- Bill Werndl in studio at WCHE
- Born: December 29, 1945 (age 80); Darby, Pennsylvania, U.S.
- Other names: Philly Billy; The Icon
- Years active: 1966-Present (54 years)

Bill Werndl (born December 29, 1945) is a sports talk radio host, currently broadcasting from WCHE 1520 AM and WBCB 1490 AM. Bill Werndl has been broadcasting for over fifty years and was the first full-time sports producer in the Philadelphia market. He also teaches a class at Widener University.

== Career in Broadcasting ==
Bill Werndl began his broadcasting career on May 9, 1966, at WFIL Radio and TV working in the mail room. In December 1966 he was promoted to newsreel and he covered over 3,000 stories over the next 30 years. His first interview was with basketball player Wilt Chamberlain. He then became an Associate Producer on various sports programs before becoming the spotter on Philadelphia Eagles radio broadcasts in 1973. He worked under Charlie Swift and then under Merrill Reese, whom he is still close to. As of 2016, Werndl spots for Reese during Eagles home games. He has spotted over 800 football games, including an Eagles pre-season game against the New Orleans Saints in Japan in 1993.

In September 1974 Bill became the first full-time Sports Producer in the Philadelphia market. Bill has worked with such notable sports broadcasters, including Joe Pellegrino, Don Tollefson, "Big Al" Meltzer, Jim "Sports" Kelly, Ron Burke and Ron Franklin.

In July, 1996, Bill moved to San Diego to work for Extra Sports 690. He replaced the late Chet Forte on the Loose Cannons program with Steve Hartman. Werndl also worked at XX1090 before returning to his native Philadelphia market in 2008.

Bill Has worked for CBS, ABC/ESPN, NBC, FOX, NFL Network, Comcast Sports Network, WPVI-TV, WYSP, WCHE and WBCB during his over fifty years of broadcasting.

He currently hosts the "Sports Chatter" on WCHE and co-hosts "Jolly and the Loon" on WBCB with Paul Jolovitz.

In 2017 he was inducted into the Pennsylvania Sports Hall of Fame.

== Career as an Author ==
Bill began working on the publication "Ourlad's Guide to the NFL Draft" in 1982, which at the time had 44 subscribers. By 1996, it was up to 6,000.

In 2016 Bill Werndl released his memoir, "No Curveballs: My Greatest Sports Stories Never Told," co-written by Joe Vallee. The book is an autobiographical look back at his encounters with many figures that he has covered and become friends with throughout sports history.
