= Joe DeCamara =

American sports radio host (born 1978)

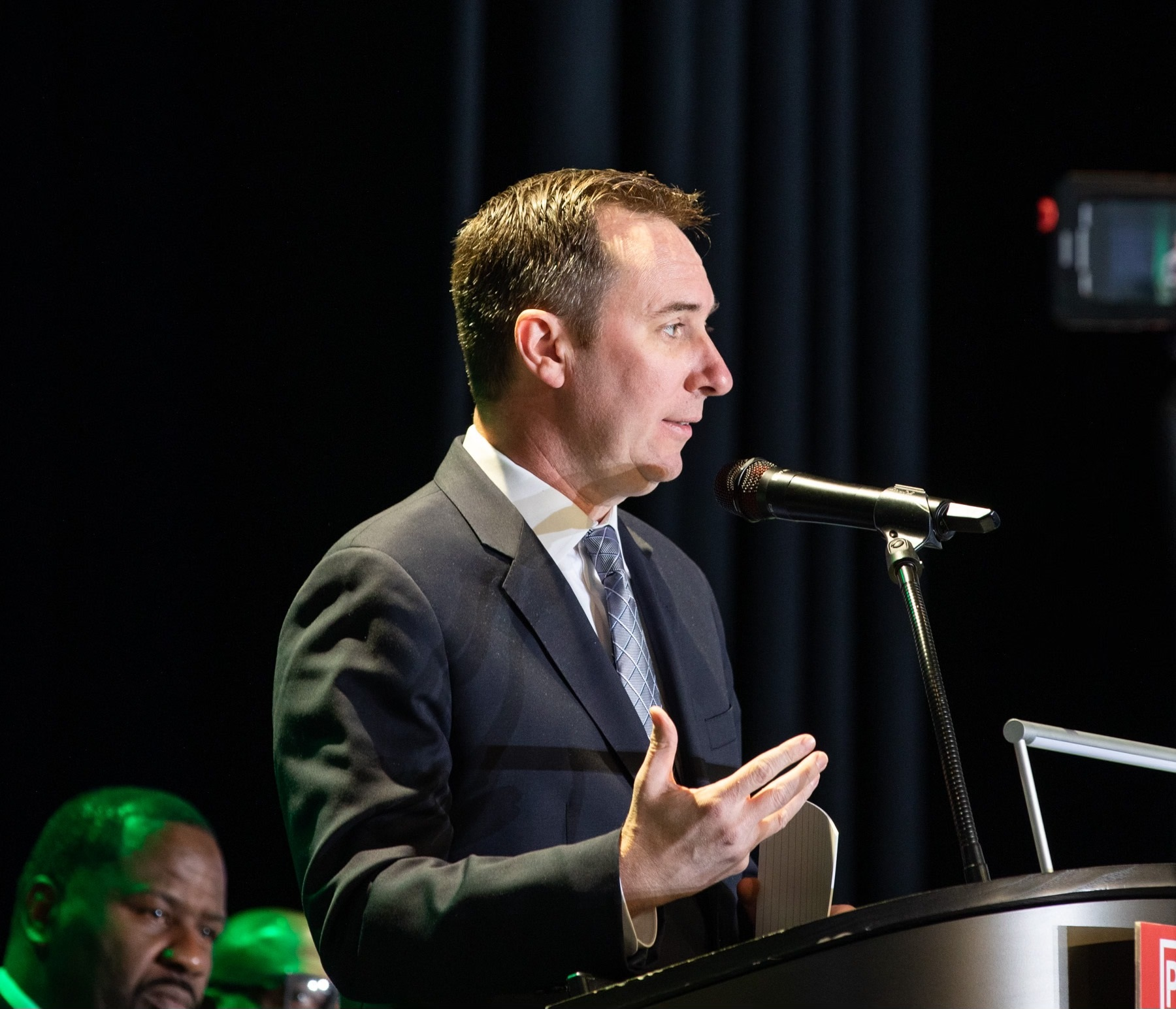
- DeCamara in 2023
- Born: Joseph Gerald DeCamara; April 26, 1978 (age 48)
- Education: Fairfield University (BA)
- Presenting career
- Show: WIP Morning Show (2023–present)
- Station: WIP-FM
- Time slot: 6:00–10:00 a.m. ET; Monday–Friday
- Country: United States
- Previous show: WIP Midday Show (2016–2023)

Joseph Gerald DeCamara (born April 26, 1978), nicknamed "the Hammer", is an American sports radio host for 94.1 WIP in Philadelphia. He currently serves with Jon Ritchie as a co-host of the station's morning show. DeCamara previously worked as a host at WBCB 1490 and 97.5 The Fanatic, along with hosting nationally syndicated shows for ESPN Radio.

== Early life and education ==
DeCamara was born on April 26, 1978, to Phil and Terese DeCamara. He is the youngest of five children. His father, Phil, ran a fire sprinkler company in Bucks County, but died suddenly of a heart attack when Joe was five years old. He graduated from St. Joseph's Prep in 1996 and from Fairfield University in 2000 with a degree in history.

== Career ==
Prior to entering sports broadcasting, DeCamara worked in finance at ING Barings. In 2002, DeCamara, seeking a career change, contacted Tom Bigby, 610 WIP's then-program director. DeCamara told Bigby to "remember my name" as he began his career in sports radio, seeking a potential future role with the station. Bigby responded that if DeCamara was to work at WIP, then "[DeCamara] would not have to find him, he would find [DeCamara]."

DeCamara began his radio career as an intern at WBCB, a radio station owned by Philadelphia Eagles play-by-play announcer Merrill Reese. Three-and a-half months into his tenure at WBCB, DeCamara was selected to host a sports show on Mondays and Thursdays after Philadelphia Phillies games. His mother Terese produced the show, and his four older siblings and uncle were frequent callers. Reese helped secure DeCamara a job in 2003 producing WYSP-FM's Eagles pre- and postgame shows.

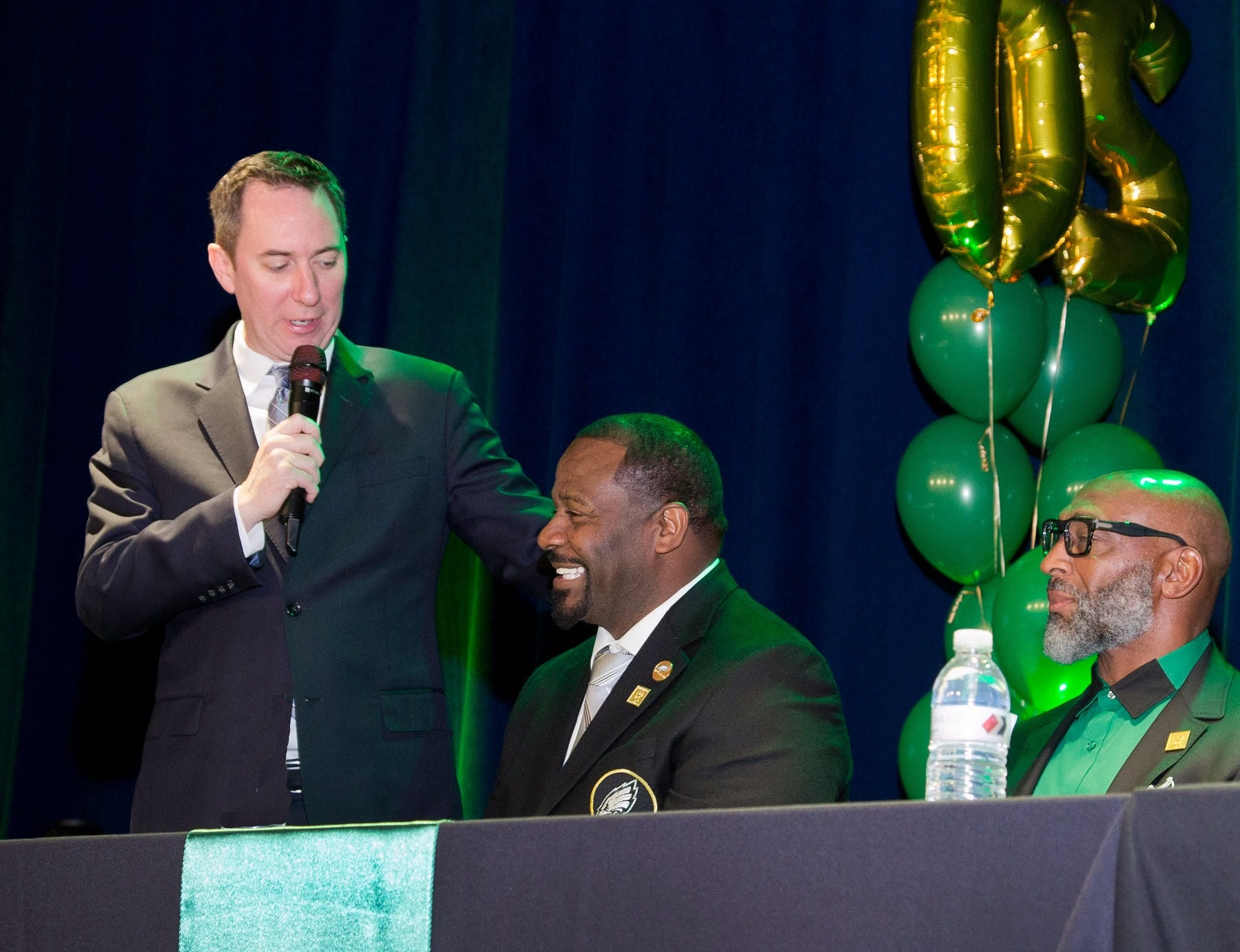
DeCamara (left) as emcee at the annual Philadelphia Sports Hall of Fame ceremony in 2023

In 2004, he joined 610 WIP to produce Howard Eskin's show on the station. DeCamara then joined Sports Radio 950 as part of their launch in 2005, and eventually became the station's assistant program director in 2007. In 2011, DeCamara began hosting his own weeknight show on the station. He also hosted the station's Eagles pregame show, along with a weekly show with former Eagles quarterback Ron Jaworski on Wednesday nights. In 2013, he began hosting a nationally-syndicated weekend show for ESPN Radio.

DeCamara also worked as an announcer for the Arena Football League. He was the play-by-play announcer for the Philadelphia Soul in 2016 on Comcast SportsNet Philadelphia and a color analyst for ArenaBowl XXX in 2017.

In 2016, DeCamara left 97.5 The Fanatic to join WIP as a co-host of the station's midday show with former Eagles fullback Jon Ritchie. Spike Eskin, WIP's then-program director, said he opted to hire DeCamara because he was impressed by DeCamara's "preparation for his show and his desire to get better." In February 2023, DeCamara and Ritchie's show moved to the morning drive timeslot, with the new show featuring the duo along with Rhea Hughes, Devan Kaney, James Seltzer, and producer Joe Weachter. DeCamara and Ritchie would replace longtime morning host Angelo Cataldi, who retired after 33 years on air.

=== "Beat the Hammer" ===
While hosting at WIP, DeCamara has run a trivia game every Friday known as "Beat the Hammer". In "Beat the Hammer", DeCamara competes with a caller to answer questions based on a category relating to Philadelphia sports, with the show's producer James Seltzer serving as the moderator. As of November 13, 2026, DeCamara holds a 326–56 (.853) record in the game.

== Bibliography ==
- The Best of Philly Sports: Amazing Moments and Stories in Philadelphia Sports History (2025). Triumph Books ISBN 978-1637279489
