= Werndl =

Werndl is an Austrian name and may refer to:

- Werndl–Holub rifle

== People ==
- Bill Werndl (born 1945), sports talk radio host
- Josef Werndl, Austrian arms producer and inventor
- Charlotte Werndl, Austrian philosopher
- Jessica von Bredow-Werndl (born 1986), German dressage rider
