= WBCB =

WBCB may refer to:

- WBCB (AM), a radio station (1490 AM) licensed to Levittown, Pennsylvania, United States
- WBCB (The CW), a digital sub-channel of WFMJ-TV in Youngstown, Ohio, which uses the false callsign WBCB
