= Steve Hartman (disambiguation) =

Steve Hartman is an American broadcast journalist.

Steve or Steven Hartman may also refer to:

- Steven Hartman, a translator of Stig Dagerman (Sleet: Selected Stories)
- Steve Hartman (sportscaster)
- Steven Hartman (voice actor) in It Was My Best Birthday Ever, Charlie Brown etc.
