= List of Yale Bulldogs in the NFL draft =

This is a list of Yale Bulldogs football players in the NFL draft.

== Key ==
B	Back	K	Kicker	NT	Nose tackle
C	Center	LB	Linebacker	FB	Fullback
DB	Defensive back	P	Punter	HB	Halfback
DE	Defensive end	QB	Quarterback	WR	Wide receiver
DT	Defensive tackle	RB	Running back	G	Guard
E	End	T	Offensive tackle	TE	Tight end

== Selections ==
Year	Round	Pick	Overall	Player	Team	Position
1936	9	8	80	Bob Train	Detroit Lions	E
1937	9	7	87	Larry Kelley	Detroit Lions	E
1938	12	6	106	Clint Frank	Detroit Lions	RB
1945	10	8	95	Paul Walker	Detroit Lions	E
1947	1	3	3	Fritz Barzilauskas	Boston Yanks	G
1947	30	2	277	John Prchlik	Boston Yanks	G
1947	31	7	292	Bill Shuler	New York Giants	E
1948	8	4	59	Robert Furse	Boston Yanks	B
1948	24	4	219	Jack Roderik	Boston Yanks	E
1950	19	6	241	Fritz Barzilauskas	New York Giants	G
1950	29	9	374	Fred Nadherny	Chicago Bears	B
1952	16	7	188	Bob Spears	Chicago Bears	B
1953	11	3	124	Ed Woodsum	Chicago Cardinals	E
1956	12	2	135	Phil Tarasovic	Pittsburgh Steelers	E
1957	8	6	91	Al Ward	Chicago Bears	B
1957	8	8	93	Paul Lopata	Washington Redskins	E
1957	24	1	278	Dennis McGill	Philadelphia Eagles	B
1961	6	14	84	Ben Balme	Philadelphia Eagles	G
1961	7	5	89	Mike Pyle	Chicago Bears	C
1964	20	14	280	Dick Niglio	Chicago Bears	RB
1965	3	3	31	Chuck Mercein	New York Giants	RB
1967	4	4	84	Bob Greenlee	Miami Dolphins	T
1969	1	24	24	Calvin Hill	Dallas Cowboys	RB
1969	8	11	193	Bruce Weinstein	Miami Dolphins	TE
1969	11	17	277	Brian Dowling	Minnesota Vikings	QB
1971	7	1	157	Don Martin	Oakland Raiders	DB
1971	13	26	338	Tom Neville	Baltimore Colts	LB
1971	14	24	362	Jim Gallagher	Minnesota Vikings	LB
1973	4	13	91	Dick Jauron	Detroit Lions	DB
1973	6	21	151	Bob Leyen	Dallas Cowboys	G
1975	9	12	220	Greg Dubinetz	Cincinnati Bengals	G
1975	14	24	362	Tom Doyle	Oakland Raiders	QB
1975	15	11	375	Rudy Green	Detroit Lions	RB
1975	17	16	432	Elvin Charity	Cincinnati Bengals	DB
1976	10	16	281	Gary Fencik	Miami Dolphins	DB
1979	9	25	245	John Spagnola	New England Patriots	TE
1980	8	1	194	Ken Hill	Oakland Raiders	DB
1982	2	26	53	Jeff Rohrer	Dallas Cowboys	LB
1982	5	25	136	Rich Diana	Miami Dolphins	RB
1982	6	20	159	Curt Grieve	Philadelphia Eagles	WR
2001	7	23	223	Than Merrill	Tampa Bay Buccaneers	DB
2001	7	24	224	Eric Johnson	San Francisco 49ers	TE
2004	6	16	181	Nate Lawrie	Tampa Bay Buccaneers	TE
2011	7	20	223	Shane Bannon	Kansas City Chiefs	RB
2018	6	26	200	Foyesade Oluokun	Atlanta Falcons	DB
2022	7	18	239	Rodney Thomas II	Indianapolis Colts	DB
2024	3	11	75	Kiran Amegadjie	Chicago Bears	T

== Notable undrafted players ==
Note: No drafts held before 1936

Debut year	Player name	Debut NFL/AFL team	Position
1979	Bill Crowley	Buffalo Bills	LB
1980	Arnie Pinkston	Seattle Seahawks	DB
1981	John Nitti	New York Jets	RB
1982	John Rogan	New York Jets	QB
1983	Joe Dufek	Buffalo Bills	QB
1985	Marc Quinlivan	Pittsburgh Steelers	WR
1986	Gene Profit	New England Patriots	CB
1988	Kelly Ryan	Dallas Cowboys	QB
1996	Chris Hetherington	Cincinnati Bengals	FB
2001	Rashad Bartholomew	Tennessee Titans	RB
2002	Josh Phillips	Houston Texans	S
2015	Tyler Varga	Indianapolis Colts	RB
2018	Jaeden Graham	Atlanta Falcons	TE
2018	Matt Oplinger	Arizona Cardinals	LB
2020	Dieter Eiselen	Chicago Bears	C
2024	Mason Tipton	New Orleans Saints	WR
