= Al Pollard =

American football player (1928–2002)

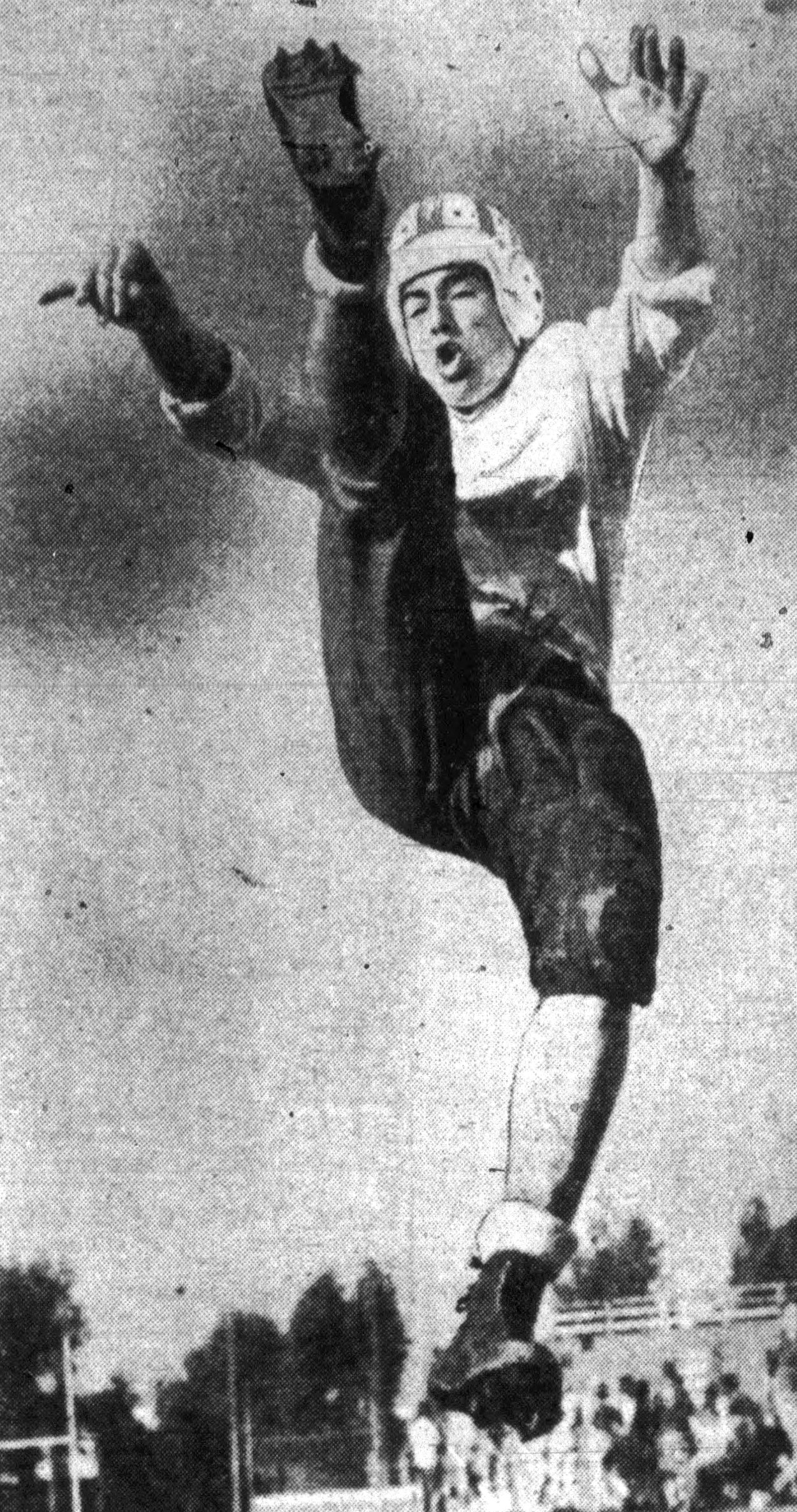
- Pollard, circa 1946

No. 21, 56, 92
- Positions: Halfback, fullback

Personal information
- Born: September 7, 1928; Glendale, California, U.S.
- Died: March 3, 2002 (aged 73); Devon, Pennsylvania, U.S.
- Listed height: 6 ft 0 in (1.83 m)
- Listed weight: 196 lb (89 kg)

Career information
- High school: Loyola (Los Angeles, California)
- College: Loyola Marymount (1947–1948); Army (1949–1950)
- NFL draft: 1951: 21st round, 251st overall pick

Career history
- New York Yanks (1951); Philadelphia Eagles (1951-1953); BC Lions (1954-1956); Calgary Stampeders (1957)

Awards and highlights
- First-team All-Eastern (1950)

Career NFL statistics
- Rushing yards: 351
- Rushing average: 3.4
- Receptions: 18
- Receiving yards: 127
- Total touchdowns: 1
- Stats at Pro Football Reference

Alfred Lee Pollard (September 7, 1928 – March 3, 2002) was an American professional football fullback and halfback. After a brief stint at Loyola University, he decided to transfer to the United States Military Academy (Army) in the spring of 1949 where he played under the renowned Vince Lombardi as his backfield coach. In his 1950 season, he was Army's statistical leader in scoring and rushing. He resigned from the school after being involved in an cribbing scandal which decimated the ranks of Army's sports teams. He was drafted by the New York Yanks in the 21st round of the 1951 NFL draft, and Pollard played a total of 30 games in the NFL with the Yanks and the Philadelphia Eagles, scoring one career touchdown. In 1954, he left the Eagles for opportunity and played in the Western Interprovincial Football Union, later known as the Canadian Football League (CFL), for the BC Lions, achieving "All Canadian" status. After retiring from football in 1957, he pursued a number of business ventures in Canada including a beverage distributorship and a well regarded Steakhouse restaurant. He move back to Pennsylvania and became a color commentator on Eagles broadcasts, first with CBS television from 1961 to 1964, and then on WIP radio, where he worked with play-by-play man Charlie Swift from 1969 to 1976. Pollard also anchored a postgame Eagles program for WCAU-TV. During his broadcasting years, he worked as a regional sales manager with a large commercial printing company and developed an ice skating and tennis court facility in Berwyn, Pa. He died of lymphoma on March 3, 2002.

== Early life ==
Pollard was born in Glendale, California, on September 7, 1928. His mother was Phyllis Pollard. He starred as a halfback at Loyola High School, where he excelled at executing T formations. In 1946, his senior year, he scored 23 touchdowns and gained a total of 1,772 yards from scrimmage. These achievements earned him his second consecutive "Player of the Year" award for Southern California high school football players by the Helms Athletic Foundation.

== College career ==
=== Loyola ===
Not heavily recruited by major colleges, Pollard decided to attend Loyola University, now known as Loyola Marymount, where high school coach Bill Sargent would be coaching. His 1947 recruiting class was known as the "Golden Boys", and the Los Angeles Times said he was the most glamorous of them. Injuries plagued his redshirt freshman campaign, and he dropped out of Loyola on February 18, 1949. This decision surprised Loyola officials; Pollard said he simply needed rest.

=== Army ===
Pollard transferred to the United States Military Academy on March 22, where he played under coach Red Blaik. Vince Lombardi was their backfield coach. Due to transfer rules, Pollard was forced to sit out the 1949 season, and he enrolled at Rutherford Preparatory School to pass West Point's entrance exam. While at Army, he was known to focus his attention mainly on football. Gil Reich, his roommate at West Point, noted that he and several other friends of Pollard frequently helped each other so as to not see anyone drop out.

In his only season on the football team (1950), he was Army's statistical leader in rushing, averaging 7.3 yards per carry, and in scoring, with 83 total points. Prior to Army's game with Penn, a scout for the latter team said Pollard was the best fullback in college football. In December, the Helms Athletic Foundation named him to their 1950 All-American team, along with fellow Army cadet Dan Foldberg. He was also named to the Associated Press and United Press All-East teams. The Associated Press praised his running capabilities, commenting that "any time he lugs the ball he's liable to go all the way."

Following the end of that season, he was one of the 90 cadets, also including coach Blaik's son, who were forced to resign from the academy because of a cribbing scandal. The scandal was chronicled in the ESPN original film Code Breakers. According to Pollard in a 1951 interview with The Philadelphia Inquirer, the whole fiasco "broke [his] heart." Following the scandal, he received scholarship offers from five major schools and a number of smaller ones. Pollard called Moose Krause, athletic director at Notre Dame, about transferring and playing for their football program, but was informed the Notre Dame Fighting Irish had not accepted transfers for six years. Although he was technically a sophomore, Pollard's class had graduated and he declared himself eligible for the 1951 NFL draft.

== Professional career ==
=== National Football League ===
Paul Myerberg of USA Today named Pollard the fifth best player from Army to play in the NFL. Pollard was selected by the New York Yanks as the eighth pick in the 21st round of the 1951 NFL Draft and 251st overall. In his third practice with New York, Pollard tore a ligament. He played six games with the Yanks, where he rushed for two yards and received 18. In addition, he returned three punts and five kickoffs for 34 and 134 yards, respectively. The Yanks, who offered him a salary of $7,000, waived him in November, and he was signed to the Philadelphia Eagles for $100.

Finishing the last six games of the 1951 season, he carried the ball 24 times and in the process gained 119 yards. He also recovered two fumbles, returned 15 punts for 114 yards, and returned 14 kickoffs for 326 yards. In his autobiography, NFL Hall of Famer Art Donovan shares the following anecdote about Pollard, his teammate in 1951: "All I remember about the game was playing with Al Pollard, a maniac back from West Point who I believe had been thrown out of the academy. He was some kind of physical-fitness nut, and between plays he'd stand there doing jumping jacks or handstands or some such nonsense."

Pollard's best season statistically was in 1952, when, in 12 games, he rushed for 186 yards and his sole touchdown in the NFL, received eight passes for 59 yards, recovered three fumbles, and returned 28 kickoffs for 528 yards. In 1953, he played in 12 games which saw him rush for 44 yards and receive for 33, recover three fumbles, gain 106 yards in 20 punt returns, and gain 150 yards in 13 kickoff returns.

Pollard was at the center of a small brawl with the San Francisco 49ers in their game on September 28, 1953. The brawl erupted in the fourth quarter, when San Francisco's Charley Powell squared off against Pollard. The Eagles ended up losing 31–21, and Pollard received no disciplinary action, although Powell was ejected.

=== Western Interprovincial Football Union ===
In September 1954, he heard his minutes would be slashed, and after the second exhibition game, Pollard retired from the Eagles. As he was under contract, Pollard was threatened with legal action from General Manager Vince McNally. He avoided the legal tangle by never officially signing with another team again, thus voiding the reserve clause on his contract. Pollard explained his rationale in a 1954 interview with The Philadelphia Inquirer: "I just got fed up... I knew they wouldn't give me much of a chance to play... I carried the ball only 23 times in 12 games last year, so something had to be wrong."

When considering joining the Western Interprovincial Football Union (now Canadian Football League), Pollard reported being given a good deal of propaganda to turn him away. He was picked up by the British Columbia Lions of the WIFU, with whom he played for until 1956. Pollard then played a single season for the Calgary Stampeders in 1957. He did not see much action with the Stampeders and ended his career due to health problems.

== Later life and broadcasting career ==
While in Canada, Pollard opened a beverage store and a restaurant. He became sports director of CKLG radio station in Vancouver. After moving back to Pennsylvania, Pollard was a color commentator on broadcasts of Eagles games for WIP radio and worked with Charlie Swift, the play-by-play man, from 1969 to 1976. The former anchored a postgame Eagles program for WCAU-TV and occasionally commented for CBS television. His voice and knowledge of sports was praised by Eagles publicist Jim Gallagher.

Between 1976 until the mid-1980s, upon retiring from broadcasting, Pollard owned and managed an ice skating rink and tennis court facility in Valley Forge, Pennsylvania. He also was regional sales manager for a large commercial web printing company and participated in organizations such as Eagles Alumni. In addition, he chaired the committee which ran the Liberty Bowl.

== Death ==
On March 2, 2002, Pollard died at his home in Devon, Pennsylvania, at the age of 73. The stated cause of death was lymphoma. Patricia Ann Root (1932–2019), his wife of 47 years; children John, Kurt (1962–2007), and Melissa Mozer; and eight grandchildren survived him in death. He was buried on March 7 at SS. Peter and Paul Cemetery in Marple Township, Pennsylvania.
