= WTXF-TV =

Television station in Philadelphia

- Philadelphia, Pennsylvania; United States
- Channels: Digital: 31 (UHF); Virtual: 29
- Branding: Fox 29 Philadelphia

Programming
- Affiliations: 29.1: Fox; for others, see § Technical information and subchannels

Ownership
- Owner: Fox Television Stations, LLC

History
- First air date: May 16, 1965
- Former call signs: WIBF-TV (1965–1969); WTAF-TV (1969–1988)
- Former channel numbers: Analog: 29 (UHF, 1965–2009); Digital: 42 (UHF, 1998–2019)
- Former affiliations: Independent (1965–1986)

Technical information
- Licensing authority: FCC
- Facility ID: 51568
- ERP: 1,000 kW
- HAAT: 336 m (1,102 ft)
- Transmitter coordinates: 40°2′26″N 75°14′18″W
- Repeater: 25 (UHF) Allentown

Links
- Public license information: Public file; LMS
- Website: www.fox29.com

WTXF-TV (channel 29) is a television station in Philadelphia, Pennsylvania, United States. Owned and operated by the Fox network through its Fox Television Stations division, the station maintains studios on Market Street in Center City and a primary transmitter on the tower farm in Roxborough, with a secondary transmitter on South Mountain in Allentown.

Channel 29 is the longest continuously operated UHF station in Philadelphia, since May 16, 1965, as WIBF-TV from studios in the suburb of Jenkintown. WIBF-TV was owned by the Fox family alongside WIBF-FM 103.9. It was the first of three new commercial UHF outlets that year, broadcasting as an independent station focusing on community and sports programming. Taft Broadcasting purchased channel 29 in 1969 and renamed it WTAF-TV. Under Taft, the station slowly emerged as the leading independent station in the Philadelphia market with popular sports coverage, movies, and syndicated programs. The station was the broadcast outlet for the Philadelphia Flyers hockey team between 1971 and 1985 and for the Philadelphia Phillies baseball team from 1983 to 1992. The latter deal came after Taft Broadcasting purchased 47 percent of the team. In early 1986, WTAF-TV began producing a 10 p.m. local newscast. Later that year, it became affiliated with the new Fox television network.

Ownership of channel 29 shifted to TVX Broadcast Group in 1987 as part of its purchase of Taft's five large-market independent stations; the call sign was changed to WTXF-TV the next year. The deal left TVX highly leveraged and ultimately led to the station's sale in two parts between 1989 and 1991 to Paramount Pictures. Paramount nearly lost the station's Fox affiliation when Fox tried to buy another Philadelphia station in 1993. That purchase fell through, and Fox ultimately purchased WTXF-TV itself in a deal approved in 1995. Fox expanded the news department, first with a morning show—Good Day Philadelphia—and later with additional early evening and other newscasts.

== History ==
In November 1952, the first construction permit for channel 29 in Philadelphia was received by WIP radio, then owned by Gimbels department store, as part of a wave of ultra high frequency (UHF) station applications and assignments following a four-year-long freeze on permit awards. WIP returned the permit in May 1954, finding that building and operating the proposed station would be economically infeasible.

=== WIBF-TV: Early years ===
In August 1962, William Fox, whose family owned WIBF-FM (103.9) in Jenkintown as well as real estate interests there, received a construction permit from the Federal Communications Commission (FCC) to build a new television station on channel 29. The new station would focus on local and regional programming, including news, local sports, and educational shows; it was the second commercial UHF station approved for the Philadelphia area after channel 17 (originally WPCA-TV). The construction permit initially specified Jenkintown as the city of license, but this was changed to Philadelphia in 1963.

In 1965, plans for channel 29 became more definite as the station announced several launch dates: first April 15, then May 1, though the station did not start broadcasting until May 16. It had contracted to air feature films and several British children's shows. Local programs included the teen show Discotheque, as well as local talk and conversation with former WCAU host Taylor Grant on the station's late newscast. Channel 29 also broadcast network shows that the city's ABC affiliate, WFIL-TV, opted not to air. Its attempts to pick up a similarly unaired NBC show were rejected because the station could not broadcast it in color.

The number of operating commercial UHF stations in the Philadelphia area would go from zero to three in 1965. After WIBF-TV, Kaiser Broadcasting debuted WKBS-TV (channel 48) on September 1, and channel 17 returned to the air after three years as WPHL-TV on September 17. To increase its coverage area, in 1966, WIBF-TV built a new transmitting tower in the Roxborough area, its transmitter having previously been located at the Fox family's Benson East apartments along with the studio. In 1967, WIBF-TV debuted Market, a six-hour stock market review program.

=== WTAF-TV: The Taft years ===
By late 1968, the Foxes disclosed that their broadcasting operations were operating with a deficit of more than $2 million (equivalent to $14.1 million in 2025 dollars). This would prove to be a major factor in the decision to sell WIBF-TV to Cincinnati-based Taft Broadcasting, a transaction which closed in May 1969 for $4.5 million, including assumption of debt (equivalent to $31.8 million in 2025 dollars), at the time the most spent for a UHF facility; an article in Variety declared of the purchase price, "For many it symbolizes the 'arrival' of UHF in the television scheme of things." Taft had room for a second UHF station—in addition to WNEP-TV (channel 16) in Scranton—because it had sold WKYT-TV in Lexington, Kentucky, the year before. However, Taft needed FCC waivers because the company already owned five stations in top-50 markets and because the signals of the two Pennsylvania stations overlapped.

On October 20, 1969, the call letters changed from WIBF-TV—which had represented members of the Fox family—to WTAF-TV, reflecting the new ownership. The call sign change was part of a wider plan to improve every aspect of the station's operation, from programming to facilities. One early priority was to leave Jenkintown—where the sign on the building still read WIBF—for more centrally located and accessible studios. While Taft's idea of moving into 30th Street Station was made infeasible by the financial problems of owner Penn Central, the station relocated to its present facilities at 4th and Market streets in December 1972.

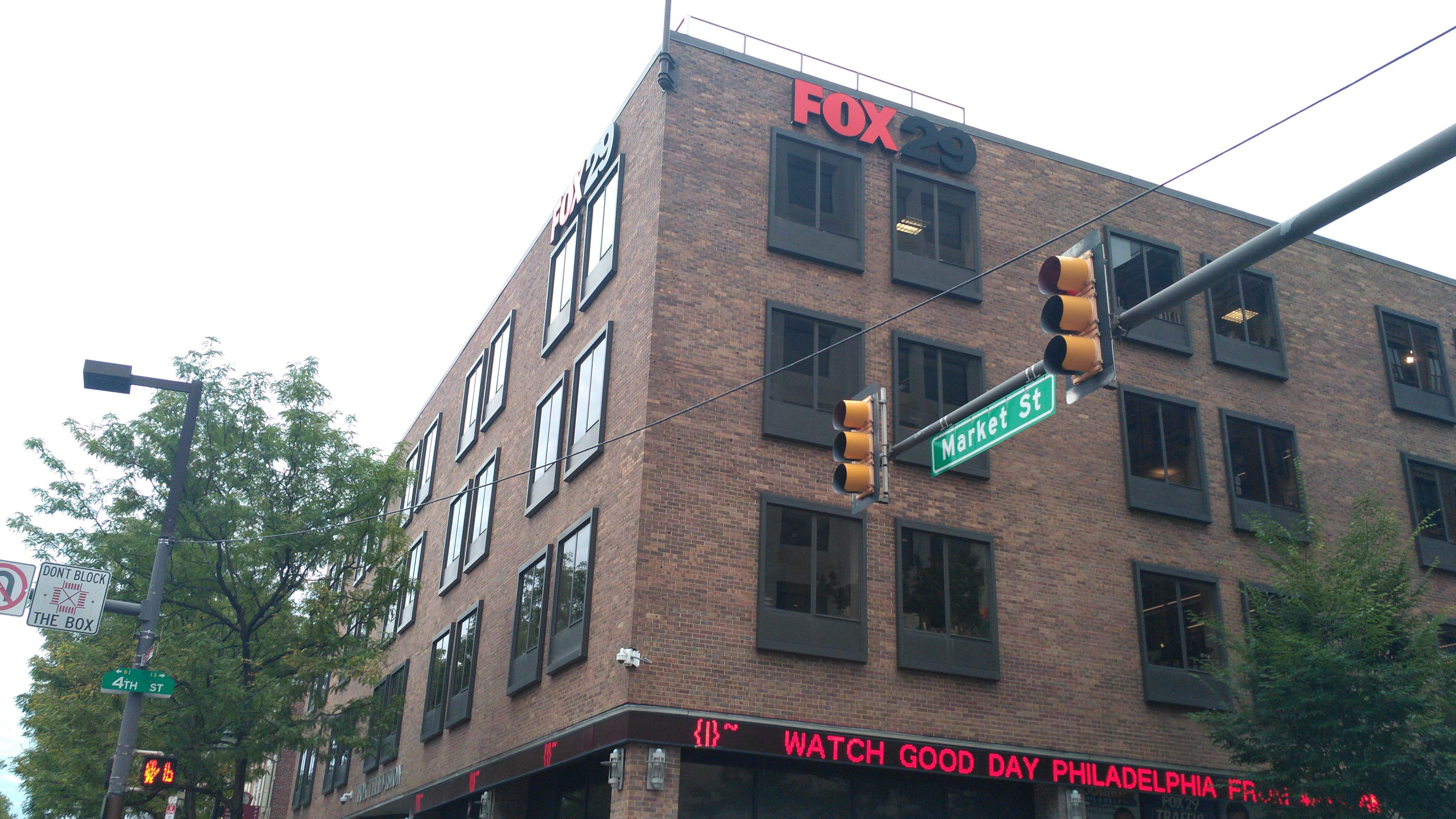
Channel 29 has operated from this building at the corner of 4th and Market streets since 1972.

Taft also expanded channel 29's local sports coverage. In 1971, channel 29 began telecasting road games of the Philadelphia Flyers of the NHL. The station also telecast the Philadelphia 76ers of the NBA, Philadelphia Freedoms of World TeamTennis, Philadelphia Wings lacrosse, and road games of the Philadelphia Bell of the short-lived World Football League in 1975 (the Bell had played on WPHL-TV in 1974). On August 29, 1975, the Bell were playing a televised contest against the Southern California Sun in Anaheim. The game began late at night because of the time difference, and WTAF-TV viewers never got to see the end of the 58-39 Sun victory, as the station signed off before the game was completed.

WTAF-TV continued to lose money in its first years under Taft, but it slowly improved its ratings and financial position over the decade. In the second half of the 1970s, WTAF-TV emerged as Philadelphia's highest-rated independent station after having previously trailed WPHL and WKBS. Flyers coverage and the strength of the station's nightly movies were cited as particular bright spots in the program lineup. It was profitable in each year between 1975 and 1978.

=== Taft and the Phillies ===
In 1981, Taft Broadcasting acquired a 47-percent stake in the Philadelphia Phillies baseball team as part of a group headed by team executive Bill Giles. The Phillies had been broadcast on WPHL-TV since 1971; that station's owner, the Providence Journal Company, had increased its rights fees for 1979 just so the team could sign free agent Pete Rose. Immediately, it was announced that Phillies games would move to channel 29 beginning in 1984, after the existing WPHL-TV contract ended, as part of a new nine-year, $30 million deal (equivalent to $89.8 million in 2025 dollars); this was brought forward a year to 1983 after Taft negotiated a buyout of channel 17's final year on the contract. For Taft, buying a large share of the Phillies and their television rights was as much about programming WTAF-TV as it was a business move: Taft executives pointed out that baseball would provide more hours of content than the entire run of M*A*S*H, a popular and long-running series which channel 29 aired in syndication.

The Philadelphia independent market contracted in 1983 when WKBS-TV went off the air, a victim of corporate infighting amid the dissolution of Field Communications. However, most of channel 48's former program inventory was purchased by WPHL-TV. Two years later, a third independent was added back to the Philadelphia lineup with the sale of WWSG-TV (channel 57) to Milton Grant and its relaunch as WGBS-TV. The Flyers moved to channel 57 after 15 seasons on channel 29, citing in part the emphasis the station had placed on promoting and broadcasting the Phillies.

=== Fox, TVX, and WTXF ===
On October 9, 1986, WTAF-TV became a charter affiliate of the fledgling Fox television network, which initially only offered late-night and weekend prime time programming. It had beaten out WPHL-TV for the affiliation.

The arrival of Fox to channel 29—announced in early August—was overshadowed later that month when Taft announced it was likely to put its five independent stations up for sale to pay down the large debt its 1985 purchase of Gulf Broadcast Group had generated, fend off activist investors such as Robert Bass, and concentrate on its portfolio of network affiliates. An appraisal estimated that WTAF-TV alone could sell for $175 million and the five stations together for $690 million (equivalent to $435 million and $1.72 billion in 2025 dollars).

The stations fetched far less than that when TVX Broadcast Group of Norfolk, Virginia, paid $240 million (equivalent to $597 million in 2025 dollars) for the package. Taft lost between $45 and $50 million. Weeks later, Taft exited its stake in the Phillies by selling the 47.5 percent of the club to its other owners for $24.1 million (equivalent to $60 million in 2025 dollars).

TVX officially closed on the deal on April 9, 1987. While TVX applied for new WTXF-TV call letters at that time as a condition of the sale because of the close association of WTAF-TV with Taft, the call sign did not change until June 1, 1988.

The Taft stations purchase gave TVX five major-market stations, though most were doing poorly, with the chief exception of channel 29. It left TVX highly leveraged and highly vulnerable. TVX's bankers, Salomon Brothers, provided the financing for the acquisition and in return held more than 60 percent of the company. The company was to pay Salomon Brothers $200 million on January 1, 1988, and missed the first payment deadline, having been unable to lure investors to its junk bonds even before the Black Monday stock market crash. While TVX recapitalized by the end of 1988, Salomon Brothers reached an agreement in principle in January 1989 for Paramount Pictures to acquire options to purchase the investment firm's majority stake. This deal was replaced in September with an outright purchase of 79 percent of TVX for $110 million (equivalent to $248 million in 2025 dollars). In 1991, Paramount acquired the remainder of TVX, forming the Paramount Stations Group.

The increasing priority and quantity of Fox network programming, as well as pressure from the network as it prepared to expand to seven-night-a-week service, led to the end of the station's association with the Phillies. In 1991, the station proposed a joint deal with KYW-TV (channel 3) to air the team's broadcast games beginning in 1993. However, the Phillies opted to return to WPHL-TV, which had the ability to broadcast more games than WTXF-TV.

=== Becoming a Fox-owned outlet ===
Combined Broadcasting, owner of WGBS-TV, put its three stations on the market in 1993. Six months later, Combined announced it had a buyer for WGBS-TV: Fox Television Stations, which would purchase channel 57 for $70 million (equivalent to $141 million in 2025 dollars) and make it the new Fox station for Philadelphia, replacing WTXF-TV. Paramount strongly criticized Fox's plans to pull its affiliation. It warned, "All affiliates of Fox should take note of the level of loyalty and commitment Fox has exhibited. Apparently Fox's loyalty only recognizes the partnership nature of a network affiliate's relationship when it is convenient to Fox's own economic interest."

With a switch that would have taken place in April 1994, at the end of channel 29's Fox affiliation agreement, WGBS-TV was also seen as likely to start a local newsroom, providing the first competition to WTXF's 10 p.m. newscast. The transaction also fueled existing speculation that Paramount was planning to join with Chris-Craft Industries to create a new network; when what eventually became the United Paramount Network (UPN) was announced that October as a joint venture of the two companies, WTXF was named as its Philadelphia affiliate.

While this occurred, Paramount itself became the subject of rival media companies seeking to purchase it. In September, Viacom agreed in principle to merge with Paramount. Not long after that, West Chester-based home shopping giant QVC mounted a competing bid, and the two firms entered into an intense bidding war; Viacom ultimately prevailed in the bidding war in February 1994.

However, Fox's attempts to buy WGBS-TV ran into opposition largely unrelated to the Philadelphia station. The New York City chapter of the National Association for the Advancement of Colored People (NAACP) filed a formal objection to Fox's planned purchase due to concerns about foreign ownership in Fox's ownership structure. As FCC approval did not come before the planned January 30, 1994, completion of the WGBS-TV deal, Combined walked away from the sale a few weeks later after one extension, preserving WTXF's Fox affiliation. Even while the deal was still pending, however, other opportunities drew Fox's attention. In January, when Fox was rebuffed in a bid to purchase Westinghouse Broadcasting (Group W)—which included KYW-TV in Philadelphia—Mediaweek reported that another station executive found Fox lacking "its customary vigor" in trying to close the WGBS-TV deal.

When Group W instead entered into a partnership with CBS—resulting in an affiliation switch at KYW-TV and the sale of CBS-owned WCAU-TV (channel 10)—a second such opportunity emerged. Several months earlier, Fox had entered into a multi-station, multi-year partnership with New World Communications. New World and NBC emerged as the leading bidders for WCAU, with New World intending to switch WCAU to Fox if it emerged victorious; Fox also joined the bidding for WCAU in case New World's bid failed. However, Paramount/Viacom changed its Philadelphia plans. On August 31, 1994, it was announced that it would sell WTXF-TV to Fox for more than $200 million (equivalent to $393 million in 2025 dollars); that transaction gave the company the cash to then turn around and buy two of Combined's stations—WGBS-TV and WBFS-TV in Miami—to become UPN stations. The FCC approved the deal in August 1995, as well as a waiver for Fox to own WTXF-TV and WNYW in New York City simultaneously.

Fox made major changes. For some time prior to the sale, the station had been looking for newer, larger facilities for its 150 employees. In September 1994, the station had settled on a site in Bryn Mawr, a suburban move seen as a blow to Center City. Fox dropped the "Fox 29" brand, calling the station "Fox Philadelphia", and instead expanded in the Center City building. The station renamed itself "Fox 29" again in 2003; Philadelphia Daily News columnist Stu Bykofsky noted that most people had continued to call it by its channel number anyway. Fox began a major renovation of the building in 2005, now occupying all four floors including space once utilized by an insurance agency and a bank.

=== 2023 license renewal objections ===
In July 2023, at WTXF-TV's routine eight-year license renewal, the Media and Democracy Project filed a petition against the renewal with the FCC, seeking greater scrutiny of the network and Fox Television Stations. Joined by former Fox executive Preston Padden and using evidence brought to light in the Dominion Voting Systems v. Fox News Network case, the petition sought denial of the license renewal over Fox Corporation's alleged misdeeds, citing the station's airing of such national news programs as Fox News Sunday and linking them to the January 6 United States Capitol attack. In the petition, Padden wrote, "...Fox has undermined our democracy and has radicalized a segment of our population by presenting knowingly false narratives about the legitimacy of the 2020 election. In my opinion, this type of reporting was a significant contributing factor to the riots in the Capitol on January 6, 2021." A second such petition was then filed by Bill Kristol and former PBS president and FCC member Ervin Duggan. Later in August, former FCC commissioner Alfred C. Sikes and Jamie Kellner, the architect of the Fox network in the 1980s, also filed informal objections to the renewal: Sikes warned that the FCC had let the requirement to operate in the public interest become "perfunctory" and called for the renewal to be "closely scrutinized in public hearings and courtrooms", while Kellner wrote, "If the character requirement for broadcast licensees is to have any meaning, the FCC must designate the application for a hearing to evaluate the Murdochs'/Fox's character qualifications to operate WTXF on the public airwaves." In an opposition, Fox criticized the relief sought by the petitioners as "a violation of the First Amendment" and emphasized the lack of specific evidence against WTXF-TV itself.

On August 23, the FCC opened a docket for the case and invited further comment. Fox highlighted letters calling for license renewal from elected officials of both parties, including U.S. representatives Brendan Boyle and Brian Fitzpatrick and three members of the Philadelphia City Council. Both of Pennsylvania's U.S. senators later filed a letter calling for WTXF's license to be renewed. Former FCC officials and a noted First Amendment lawyer, Floyd Abrams, filed comments supporting denial of the renewal.

On January 16, 2025, in the final days of the Biden administration, FCC chair Jessica Rosenworcel dismissed the petition to deny a renewal of the broadcast license for WTXF and renewed the license. She cited defense of the First Amendment as her rationale. Also dismissed were petitions from conservative groups against stations owned by ABC, CBS, and NBC. Incoming FCC chair Brendan Carr reinstated the complaints against ABC, CBS, and NBC but not the one against WTXF. The Media and Democracy Project appealed the dismissal in February 2025, with no FCC action taken as of July 2026. In July 2026, the Media and Democracy Project filed a writ of mandamus with the U.S. Court of Appeals asking the court to compel the FCC to act.

== News operation ==
=== The Ten O'Clock News ===
In late 1985, under Taft Broadcasting, WTAF-TV began to build an in-house news department to prepare a 10 p.m. newscast with a focus on hard news. Roger LaMay was recruited from KTTV in Los Angeles to run the newsroom, which was set up in a former film library in the basement of the Center City studios, and former KYW-TV sports anchor Howard Eskin was signed as channel 29's first marquee news personality. One reporter was Dan Mechem, son of Taft Broadcasting chairman Charles Mechem.

The Ten O'Clock News debuted on February 17, 1986, as the first prime time newscast in Philadelphia since WKBS-TV discontinued its effort in 1970. The half-hour program was anchored by Lee McCarthy, a former NBC network correspondent. That fall, the weeknight-only broadcast expanded to weekends; the program's audience doubled in its first year on air.

The program was extended to an hour in 1990—delayed by the Paramount acquisition of TVX—with original reporter Jill Chernekoff returning to the station after a year at Headline News to co-anchor the expanded newscast. Eskin's contract was not renewed for financial reasons, with his last sportscast coming in June 1990; the station let go of McCarthy in January 1994.

=== Expansion to mornings and beyond ===
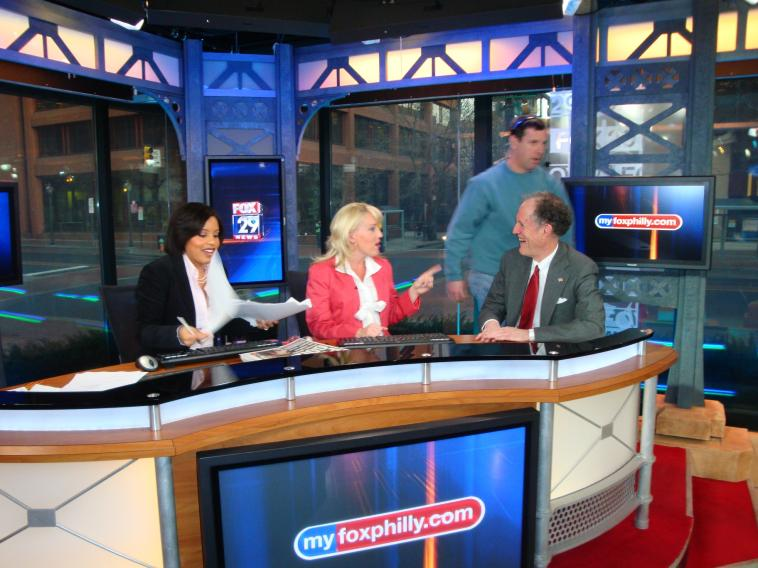
Senator Ted Kaufman (D-DE) appears on Good Day Philadelphia in February 2009.

After Fox acquired WTXF-TV, it made major investments in the news operation. It expanded and at long last computerized the newsroom. It assembled a new staff of 32 to launch a morning show, Good Day Philadelphia, consisting of a 6:30 a.m. newscast and two-hour morning show, on April 1, 1996. The program was originally hosted by Tracey Matisak and Don Tollefson, former WPVI-TV sports director. In addition, WTXF acquired a helicopter for newsgathering purposes. The 6:30 a.m. news was retooled into an hour-long program, Fox Morning News, in 1997.

Tollefson left Good Day in 1998 to return to sportscasting at the station and was replaced by Dave Price and then Mike Jerrick. Even though local morning shows had been ratings engines for Fox elsewhere in the country, this was not initially the case for WTXF. In 1999, Good Day Philadelphia was described by Ellen Gray of the Philadelphia Daily News as "chronically underperforming" in the ratings.

Beginning in 2006, WTXF-TV began filling out the rest of its broadcast day with newscasts in key time slots as part of a strategy to increase its local news visibility. The first to be introduced were an 11 a.m. newscast in October 2006, followed by a 5 p.m. newscast in January 2007. On September 7, 2009, channel 29 expanded its morning and evening news programming: Good Day Philadelphia was expanded to five hours on that date with the addition of an hour at 9 a.m. and a new half-hour 6 p.m. weeknight newscast. The Good Day Philadelphia expansion replaced the national Morning Show with Mike & Juliet; Jerrick, who had co-hosted that program and also worked at Fox News Channel after leaving channel 29, returned to WTXF as anchor of the second half of the new Good Day Philadelphia.

In November 2008, after a trial between WCAU and WTXF, Fox Television Stations and NBC Local Media entered into an agreement to test a system that would allow stations owned by Fox and NBC to pool news resources ranging from sharing field video to sharing aerial helicopter footage, in an attempt to reduce costs. Eskin returned to WTXF in 2012, serving as the station's evening sports anchor.

Weekend morning newscasts were added in 2014, while an 11 p.m. newscast debuted in 2016. In January 2020, the station revamped its 6 p.m. newscast as The Six, which adapted elements from Good Day Philadelphia and focused on top headlines and feature segments to differentiate it from the other local stations providing news at that hour.

WTXF overhauled its anchor lineup for its evening newscasts in 2019, with Jason Martinez—last of KGTV in San Diego—joining Shaina Humphries on the anchor desk. Humphries departed in 2022 and joined the startup newsroom at WWJ-TV in Detroit; she was replaced at WTXF by Shiba Russell, who had last worked in Atlanta.

A 2023 study conducted by the Lenfest Institute found that, of the four major TV newsrooms in Philadelphia, WTXF gave the most coverage to crime, devoting 69 percent of its news stories to the topic; this surpassed 50 percent for WPVI, 39 percent for KYW, and 31 percent for WCAU. Previously, in 2020, an article in Philadelphia magazine spotlighted a conservative turn in senior management in news philosophy; the article, based on interviews with 10 current and former WTXF-TV staffers, described a newsroom that was "toxic", "racially offensive", and "socially intimidating".

In addition to its own newscasts, on July 8, 2013, WTXF began airing Chasing New Jersey, a daily New Jersey-focused public affairs program. Chasing New Jersey, which was produced by Fairfax Productions (a production company led by WTXF's vice president and general manager) from a studio in Trenton and hosted by Bill Spadea, was designed to replace the 10 p.m. newscast on sister station WWOR-TV. The program was cancelled in July 2020.

=== Notable current on-air staff ===
- Mike Jerrick – Good Day Philadelphia anchor
- Devan Kaney – sports anchor and reporter
- Kathy Orr – meteorologist

=== Notable former on-air staff ===
- John Bolaris – meteorologist, 2007–2011
- Joyce Evans – anchor, 1996–2020
- Kendis Gibson – reporter, 1998–1999
- Sheinelle Jones – reporter/anchor, 2005–2014
- Clayton Morris – Good Day Philadelphia anchor, 2007
- Dawn Stensland – anchor, 2001–2009

== Technical information and subchannels ==
WTXF's primary transmitter is located in Roxborough, with a secondary transmitter on South Mountain in Allentown. The station's signal is multiplexed:

Subchannels of WTXF-TV
Subchannel	Res.	Short name	Programming
29.1	720p	WTXFDT	Fox
29.2	480i	Movies!	Movies!
29.3	480i	QVC2	QVC2
29.4	480i	BUZZR	Buzzr
29.5	480i	Weather	Fox Weather
57.2	480i	Nest	The Nest (WPSG)
57.3	480i	Confess	Confess (WPSG)

Broadcast on behalf of another station

=== Analog-to-digital conversion ===
WTXF-TV began digital broadcasting on October 27, 1998. The station shut down its analog signal, over UHF channel 29, on June 12, 2009, the official date on which full-power television stations in the United States transitioned from analog to digital broadcasts under federal mandate. The station's digital signal continued to broadcast on its pre-transition UHF channel 42, using virtual channel 29.

WTXF-TV relocated its signal from channel 42 to channel 31 on January 17, 2020, as a result of the 2016 United States wireless spectrum auction.
