= Jon Ritchie =

American football player and sports radio host (born 1974)

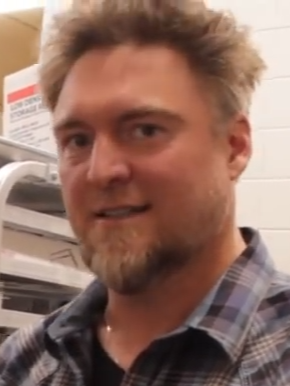
- Ritchie in 2019

No. 40, 48
- Position: Fullback

Personal information
- Born: September 4, 1974 (age 52); Mechanicsburg, Pennsylvania, U.S.
- Listed height: 6 ft 2 in (1.88 m)
- Listed weight: 250 lb (113 kg)

Career information
- High school: Cumberland Valley (Mechanicsburg, Pennsylvania)
- College: Michigan (1993–1994); Stanford (1996–1997)
- NFL draft: 1998: 3rd round, 63rd overall pick

Career history
- Oakland Raiders (1998–2002); Philadelphia Eagles (2003–2004)

Career NFL statistics
- Rushing yards: 36
- Rushing average: 2.4
- Receptions: 150
- Receiving yards: 1,148
- Receiving touchdowns: 7
- Stats at Pro Football Reference

Jon David Ritchie (born September 4, 1974) is an American sports radio host and former professional football fullback who played in the National Football League (NFL) for seven seasons. He played college football at Michigan for two seasons before transferring to Stanford, and was selected by the Oakland Raiders in the third round of the 1998 NFL draft. He spent five seasons with the Raiders before signing with the Philadelphia Eagles in 2003, where he spent two seasons before retiring in 2006. Despite only 15 rushing attempts in his NFL career, Ritchie built a reputation with his blue-collar work ethic and was considered one of the best blocking fullbacks in the league.

After retiring from football, Ritchie entered a career in media. He has previously appeared as a contributor for ESPN and the NBC Sports Network. From 2013 to 2014, he co-hosted The Artie Lange Show alongside comedian Artie Lange. Since 2016, he has served as a co-host alongside Joe DeCamara on 94.1 WIP in Philadelphia.

== Early life ==
Ritchie attended Cumberland Valley High School near Mechanicsburg, Pennsylvania, from 1989 to 1993. He led his high school football team to the state championship in 1992, and in 1993, he won the John Travers Award, which honors the top high school student athletes in Central Pennsylvania.

== College career ==
Coming out of high school, Ritchie was considered the best fullback recruit in the nation. A Pennsylvania native, Ritchie was recruited aggressively by Penn State, however, he ultimately chose to play for Michigan.

Ritchie played for two seasons at Michigan, where he rushed for 120 yards and caught two passes for 13 yards. In 1995, he transferred to Stanford, where he originally played as an inside linebacker, but switched back to fullback. As a fullback, he rushed 17 times for 95 yards and caught nine passes for 80 yards and two touchdowns. He is a member of the Delta Tau Delta fraternity.

== Professional career ==
Pre-draft measurables
Height	Weight	Arm length	Hand span	40-yard dash	10-yard split	20-yard split	20-yard shuttle	Vertical jump
6 ft 1 4/5 in (1.87 m)	248 lb (112 kg)	31 9/10 in (0.81 m)	10 1/4 in (0.26 m)	4.66 s	1.61 s	2.65 s	4.09 s	31 in (0.79 m)
All values from NFL Combine

=== Oakland Raiders (1998–2002) ===
Ritchie was selected in the third round (63rd overall) of the 1998 NFL draft by the Oakland Raiders. He started for the Raiders for five seasons, and established himself as a top blocking fullback. With Ritchie as fullback, Raiders running back Charlie Garner posted three seasons of more than 1,700 yards from scrimmage after rushing for just 381 yards the year before he joined Oakland. In 2002, the Raiders led the league in total yardage, en route to an AFC championship win. In Super Bowl XXXVII, Ritchie caught one pass for seven yards in a 48–21 loss to the Tampa Bay Buccaneers.

=== Philadelphia Eagles (2003–2004) ===
In 2003, Ritchie signed a two-year contract with the Philadelphia Eagles. He had expressed an interest in playing closer to his hometown, which was just 90 miles west of Philadelphia, so his friends and family could watch and attend his games. In 2003, Ritchie helped the Eagles running back tandem of Brian Westbrook, Duce Staley, and Correll Buckhalter, along with quarterback Donovan McNabb, rush for a total of 2,015 yards and 23 touchdowns. Ritchie himself also scored three touchdown receptions during the season.

Three games into the 2004 season, Ritchie tore his anterior cruciate ligament while covering a punt in a game against the Detroit Lions, abruptly ending his season. He re-signed with the Eagles on a one-year contract for the 2005 season while recovering from his injury, and although he was expected to be the starting fullback for the team once recovered, he was released by the Eagles at the end of training camp, a move that he described as a "complete and total shock". He announced his retirement from football prior to the 2006 season.

== NFL career statistics ==
Legend
**Bold**	Career high

=== Regular season ===
Year	Team	GP	Rushing				Receiving				Fumbles	
Year	Team	GP	Att	Yds	Avg	TD	Rec	Yds	Avg	TD	Fum	Lost
1998	OAK	15	**9**	**23**	**2.6**	0	29	225	7.8	0	**2**	**1**
1999	OAK	**16**	5	12	2.4	0	**45**	**408**	**9.1**	1	0	0
2000	OAK	13	0	0	0.0	0	26	173	6.7	0	0	0
2001	OAK	15	0	0	0.0	0	19	154	8.1	2	0	0
2002	OAK	**16**	0	0	0.0	0	10	66	6.6	1	1	0
2003	PHI	**16**	1	0	1.0	0	17	86	5.1	**3**	0	0
2004	PHI	3	0	0	0.0	0	4	36	9.0	0	0	0
Total		94	15	36	2.4	0	150	1,148	7.7	7	3	1

=== Postseason ===
Year	Team	GP	Rushing				Receiving				Fumbles	
Year	Team	GP	Att	Yds	Avg	TD	Rec	Yds	Avg	TD	Fum	Lost
2000	OAK	1	0	0	0.0	0	1	5	5.0	0	0	0
2001	OAK	2	0	0	0.0	0	1	11	11.0	0	0	0
2002	OAK	**3**	0	0	0.0	0	**3**	**35**	**11.7**	0	0	0
2003	PHI	2	0	0	0.0	0	1	1	1.0	0	0	0
2004	PHI	Did not play due to injury										
Total		8	0	0	0.0	0	6	52	8.7	0	0	0

== Media career ==
After his retirement from football, Ritchie began working as a color commentator for NFL Europe games broadcast on NFL Network, and did NFL commentary for his local ABC affiliate WHTM-TV. He also served as an analyst on CN8 for college football games.

Ritchie appeared as a contributor for various shows on ESPN, including First Take, NFL 32, Outside the Lines, and College Football Overdrive. In September 2010, he started hosting a college football Saturday edition of SportsNation with Michelle Beadle.

In 2013, he became a co-host on the nationally syndicated, late-night radio program The Artie Lange Show, hosted by comedian Artie Lange. The show was cancelled on April 28, 2014.

Ritchie then worked as an on-air personality and analyst for NBCSN's Fantasy Football Live on Thursdays and DirecTV's Fantasy Zone Channel on Sundays. He was also a contributor for Comcast SportsNet Philadelphia's regional NFL coverage and NBC Sports Radio's NFL coverage.

In 2016, Ritchie joined 94.1 WIP, where he was paired with Joe DeCamara as a co-host of the station's midday show. In 2023, DeCamara and Ritchie moved to the morning drive timeslot and joined Rhea Hughes, Devan Kaney, James Seltzer, and Joe Weachter for a new morning show following the retirement of longtime host Angelo Cataldi.

== Other ventures ==
=== 2016 State Senate campaign ===
In February 2016, Ritchie that he would run for the Pennsylvania State Senate to replace the retiring Pat Vance in Pennsylvania's 31st State Senate District. His campaign policies included lowering taxes, fighting for pension reform, and helping to revitalize Pennsylvania's education system. In a four-way race for the Republican nomination, Ritchie finished second to Mike Regan, receiving roughly 30% of the vote. Despite this, Ritchie would actually win the Democratic nomination by write-in votes, but ultimately decided not to run in the general election against Regan.

== Personal life ==
After retiring from the NFL, Ritchie moved back to his hometown of Mechanicsburg, Pennsylvania, where he helped coach the high school football team for which he played, the Cumberland Valley Eagles. He spoke at the commencement for the high school's class of 2005 and class of 2008.
