= By Saam =

American sportscaster (1914–2000)

Byrum Saam
- Born: Byrum Fred Saam Jr. September 11, 1914; Fort Worth, Texas, U.S.
- Died: January 16, 2000 (aged 85); Devon, Pennsylvania, U.S.
- Education: Texas Christian University; University of Minnesota
- Occupation: Sportscaster
- Years active: 1934–1976
- Spouse: Anne Fitzpatrick (m. 1939; died 1986)
- Children: 3
- Awards: Ford C. Frick Award (1990); Philadelphia Broadcast Pioneers Hall of Fame (1993)
- Sports commentary career
- Teams: Philadelphia Athletics (1938–1954); Philadelphia Phillies (1939–1949; 1955–1976)
- Genre: Play-by-play
- Sports: Major League Baseball; NCAA football National Football League; National Basketball Association

Byrum Fred "By" Saam Jr. (September 11, 1914 – January 16, 2000) was an American sportscaster. He was best known as the first full-time voice of baseball in Philadelphia.

== Early life ==
Saam was born in Fort Worth, Texas, where he attended high school with Ben Hogan. He was the public address announcer at high school football games and began calling them on the radio even before he graduated. While at Texas Christian University (where he was a classmate of Sammy Baugh), he broadcast Southwest Conference football games, many of which aired on CBS Radio's College Football Roundup.

Ted Husing, CBS's main sportscaster, heard some of Saam's work and suggested that Saam apply for a job at WCCO in Minneapolis in 1934. The station asked him to do a baseball audition. While Saam had played baseball in high school, he'd never broadcast it before. However, he did well enough to get the job and soon became the station's lead sportscaster. He called the Triple A Minneapolis Millers, re-created the 1935 World Series, and called University of Minnesota football.

== In Philadelphia ==
=== First year ===
Moving to WCAU in Philadelphia in 1937, he called Temple, University of Pennsylvania and Villanova football games. He was soon noticed by the owners of both major league ballclubs in Philadelphia, the Athletics and the Phillies.

=== Phillies and Athletics ===
In 1938, Saam became the first full-time voice of the Athletics; he added the Phillies the next year and continued this double duty for 12 seasons. This was possible since both teams shared Shibe Park and almost never played at home on the same day. For most of Saam's tenure, the A's and Phillies were also-rans; indeed, he didn't call a winning team until 1947, with the A's. He was behind the microphone for over 4,000 losses—by one estimate, the most of any baseball announcer ever. His descriptive play-by-play flair earned Saam the nickname "The Man of a Zillion Words." Although he lived in the Delaware Valley for the rest of his life, he always spoke with a soft Texas accent.

After both Philadelphia teams began airing road games live in 1950, Saam was forced to drop one team since no radio station could handle the full load. He chose to drop the Phillies, since he and Athletics owner/manager Connie Mack had been longtime friends. As luck would have it, the 1950 Phillies won their first National League pennant in 35 years, while the A's finished with the worst record in baseball. Saam and partner Claude Haring did Athletics games until the team left for Kansas City after the 1954 season.

=== Later years with the Phillies ===
After the Athletics moved to Kansas City, Saam returned to the Phillies in 1955. He was joined by Bill Campbell in 1962; the pair was joined by former Phillies outfielder Richie Ashburn a year later. Campbell left in 1970 and was replaced by Harry Kalas. They broadcast Phillies games until Saam's retirement in 1975. Ironically, the year after Saam retired, the Phillies won the National League East, their first postseason appearance of any kind since 1950—meaning that for the second time in his career, a case of bad timing had cost Saam a chance at calling a pennant or division winner. For this reason, Kalas and Ashburn invited Saam into the booth for the division-clinching game and let him call the last half-inning. The Phillies also added him to the broadcast team during the NLCS. Ashburn later said, "Thirty-eight years and no winner. Damn right he deserved a title."

Despite having never called a pennant or division winner in Philadelphia, Saam did call 13 no-hitters, including Jim Bunning's perfect game in 1964. He also broadcast the World Series for NBC Radio in 1959 and 1965.

While most announcers of his era were unabashed "homers," Saam rarely rooted for the Phillies and A's from the booth. In a book that he started but never finished before his death, he said that he "never felt it would serve any constructive purpose" to criticize umpires, even when it was obvious they'd missed a call. Campbell recalled that Saam's philosophy in life was "rolling along"; his composure never changed during big wins or losing streaks that seemed to last forever.

=== Other broadcasting areas ===
Away from baseball, he worked games for the Philadelphia Eagles and Philadelphia Warriors. He was one of the broadcasters during Wilt Chamberlain's 100-point game in 1962. Saam was also the first announcer of a nationally televised NFL game on Thanksgiving: he was at the microphone in Detroit on November 26, 1953, when the Lions beat the Green Bay Packers, 34–15. The game was carried on the now-defunct DuMont Network.

Saam also called games of the Eastern Hockey League's Philadelphia Ramblers: on January 8, 1961, the Ramblers visited the New York Rovers at the Long Island Arena with Saam broadcasting the third period and overtime back to Philadelphia.

Saam was known for the occasional slip-up on the air. For example, he once opened a game by saying, "Hello, Byrum Saam, this is everybody speaking." (This goof has also been credited to other announcers, including Lindsey Nelson and Phil Rizzuto.) Prior to Game 5 of the 1959 World Series, when Mel Allen introduced the NBC Radio audience to "amiable, affable, able Byrum Saam", a distracted Saam unthinkingly replied, "Right you are, Mel Allen." Once, Saam created a beheading when Alex Johnson, the Phillies' left fielder, chased a fly ball: "Alex Johnson is going back. He's going back, back. His head hits the wall. He reaches down, picks it up, and throws into second base." (Jerry Coleman made a similar statement about Dave Winfield in a San Diego Padres broadcast.)

== Later life ==
In 1990, Byrum Saam was awarded the Ford Frick Award by the Baseball Hall of Fame for excellence in broadcasting. Ashburn was later honored by the Hall of Fame as a player, and Kalas won the Frick Award in 2002.

By Saam was inducted into the Philadelphia Broadcast Pioneers Hall of Fame in 1993.

He took classes to learn the 'Philadelphia accent.' He had three children with his wife Anne and has six grandchildren, including Byrum "Jake" Saam.

Saam died in 2000 in Devon, Pennsylvania.
