= Joyce Evans =

American news anchor and reporter

Joyce Evans is an American retired news anchor and reporter. She anchored WTXF's Fox 29 News at 6 and 10 p.m. on weekends. She joined the station in 1996 as a weekend anchor and general assignment reporter.

== Career ==
Evans began her journalism career as the morning anchor at WSET in Lynchburg, Virginia, and later was a weekend anchor and public affairs program host in Miami, Florida, at WCIX (now WFOR). She moved to Philadelphia and for ten years worked at KYW-TV as a reporter, fill-in anchor and host of The Saturday Tribune. She signed off her final broadcast on August 29, 2020.

== Personal life ==
Born June 14, 1956, in Washington, D.C., the 5th child (of 8) of William A. and Margaret Evans, she attended Kenilworth Elementary, Grimke Elementary, Shaw Jr. High, and graduated from McKinley High School. Evans attended Howard University Upward Bound and is a graduate (Class of 1978) of Florida A&M University with a Bachelor of Science degree in journalism, and is a distinguished alumna. She is a member of the Delta Sigma Theta sorority, the National Association of Black Journalists and the Broadcast Pioneers of Philadelphia where in 2018, she was inducted into their hall of fame. She is a native of Washington, D.C., and resides in Philadelphia, Pennsylvania.
