= Devan Kaney =

American television reporter (born 1991)

- Born: June 1, 1991 (age 35)
- Education: University of Pittsburgh (BA); American University (MA)
- Occupations: Sports anchor and reporter
- Website: https://devankaney.com/

Devan Kaney is an American sports reporter and anchor who is the Chicago Bears Reporter WFLD in Chicago. She also previously served as an on-air personality for WIP-FM from 2022 to 2026, and additionally served as the sideline reporter for the station's broadcasts of Philadelphia Eagles games from 2024 to 2026.

== Early life ==
Kaney grew up in Radnor, Pennsylvania, and attended Radnor High School. She graduated from the University of Pittsburgh in 2013 with a degree in communication. She graduated from American University in 2015 with a master's degree in broadcast journalism.

== Career ==
Kaney has served as an analyst and sideline reporter for the National Lacrosse League, including hosting several special league events. She also spent time as a reporter in Chicago and for KBOI-TV in Boise, Idaho. In 2022, Kaney joined Audacy to become an analyst on the company's BetQL Network. That same year, she became a contributor on Joe DeCamara and Jon Ritchie's show on Audacy-owned WIP-FM. In 2023, DeCamara and Ritchie's show was moved to the morning drive timeslot, and Kaney was added as a rotating co-host along with DeCamara, Ritchie, Rhea Hughes, James Seltzer, and producer Joe Weachter.

In June 2023, Kaney joined WTXF-TV in Philadelphia to serve as a sports anchor and reporter for the station.

In December 2024, following the departure of Howard Eskin from WIP, Kaney was named the sideline reporter for the station's broadcasts of Philadelphia Eagles games.

On April 1, 2026, Kaney was let go at WIP after a series of layoffs by parent company Audacy.

Kaney also served as an in-arena host for Philadelphia Flyers games at Xfinity Mobile Arena. Kaney now covers the Chicago Bears and Sports at Fox 32 Chgo...
