= Rights to Ricky Sanchez =

Podcast

Rights to Ricky Sanchez is a sports podcast about the Philadelphia 76ers, founded and hosted by Philadelphia sports talk host/former New York sports radio executive Spike Eskin and television comedy writer Michael Levin. The podcast debuted in 2013 and is named after Puerto Rican basketball player Ricky Sánchez, whose contractual rights the 76ers owned from 2007 to 2012.

The podcast has become one of the most influential single-team podcasts in sports, with celebrity interviews, live shows, catchphrases, and fan movements that have impacted the larger 76ers and NBA culture.

== History ==
The Rights to Ricky Sanchez podcast was launched by Spike Eskin and Michael Levin in July 2013, following the hiring of Sixers general manager Sam Hinkie. The early years of the podcast followed the team during the years of what would come to be called “The Process,” where the team was intentionally bad in order to better their draft position and long-term outlook. Eskin and Levin were among the most vocal supporters of The Process, arguing weekly on behalf of fans who wanted the team to build for the future with the goal of ultimately winning a championship.

Over this period, Eskin and Levin also started the annual tradition of the Lottery Party, where Philadelphia-area fans would assemble to watch the ESPN broadcast of the NBA Draft Lottery, which would determine the Sixers’ position in the upcoming NBA draft. As the podcast became more popular and the team's record began to improve in the late 2010s, the Rights to Ricky Sanchez also hosted several Philadelphia-area live podcasts, with then-current Sixers T. J. McConnell, Dario Šarić, Mike Scott, head coach Brett Brown and general manager Elton Brand as special guests.

In 2018, the now-twice-a-week podcast also launched a content vertical. It featured writing from both hosts, as well as from a pool of regular writers and podcast guests, including Andrew Unterberger (“AU”), Mike O’Connor (“MOC”), Beckett Sanderson ("The Statman") and former writers Adam Aaronson ("SixersAdam"), Dan Olinger ("The Danny"), and Alonzo Jones (“Zo”). Abbie Huertas was added as the site's primary illustrator in 2019. CJ Coyle was brought on as the show's primary producer in 2020, leading to the podcast also being broadcast live online over social media and the site's YouTube channel.

== Format ==
The podcast begins with discussion of weekly news events related to the Philadelphia 76ers, with the two hosts offering their often wildly contrasting views on recent games, personnel moves, and player updates. Then the hosts read listener letters, play listener phone messages, and rotate through a number of recurring segments unrelated to the Sixers – including “Relationship Advice,” where the two give their thoughts about romantic issues listeners are struggling with, and “Jigsaw,” where Eskin asks Levin to choose between two extremely undesirable real-life hypothetical situations. Special guests on the podcast have included national commentators, Sixers players and executives, and famous fans of the show from music and politics. (See "Notable Guests" section.)

== Impact on 76ers Culture ==
Trust the Process: First said publicly by 76ers guard Tony Wroten in 2015, “Trust the Process” became the unofficial motto of the Hinkie-led Sixers. Eskin and Levin were instrumental in cementing the saying as the era's go-to catchphrase, repeating it often on the podcast and printing it on t-shirts, one of which was worn on ESPN by Around the Horn panelist Pablo Torre. While writing for the FOX comedy series The Grinder, Levin also included the line in one of his scripts, said by character Stewart (Fred Savage) in the 2016 episode “A System on Trial.”

The Hinkie Billboard: After Sam Hinkie resigned as general manager in 2016, amidst rumors of league and ownership dissatisfaction over the team's direction, Eskin and Levin organized the renting of a highway billboard to pay tribute. The billboard, erected over a section of Interstate 95, read “Hinkie Forever,” with a picture of Hinkie, as well as advertisements for the 2016 Rights to Ricky Sanchez Lottery Party and Philadelphia-area jeweler (and longtime RTRS sponsor) LL Pavorsky.

Retweet Armageddon: Early in the podcast, Eskin and Levin developed the idea of “Retweet Armageddon” as a day of reckoning for sports analysts who had made disparaging remarks about The Process over the years, once Hinkie's course of action had been properly validated. The day was finally scheduled for June 19, 2017, after a majority of the Retweet Armageddon Congress voted to approve the decision following the Sixers trading for the 2017 NBA draft’s No. 1 pick, moving into position to select top college prospect Markelle Fultz. “Retweet Armageddon” trended nationally on Twitter as 76ers fans re-shared anti-Process opinions that had aged poorly, with Sixers superstar Joel Embiid even joining in the movement.

== Notable Guests ==
- Former 76ers General Manager Sam Hinkie
- Basketball coach Brett Brown
- Singer/Guitarist Adam Granduciel of The War on Drugs
- American businessperson and politician Andrew Yang
- Philadelphia City Councilperson Helen Gym
- Sportswriter Zach Lowe
- Basketball executive, and 76ers President of Basketball Operations (2020–2026), Daryl Morey
- Singer-songwriter Amos Lee
- Philadelphia local Tony T
- NBA player Joel Embiid
- NBA player Tobias Harris
- Sportswriter Pablo Torre
- Professional bowler Bill O'Neill

== See also ==
- Philadelphia 76ers
- Spike Eskin
- Ricky Sánchez
