= Ricky Sánchez =

Puerto Rican basketball player (born 1987)

Personal information
- Born: July 6, 1987 (age 39) Guayama, Puerto Rico
- Listed height: 6 ft 11 in (2.11 m)
- Listed weight: 230 lb (104 kg)

Career information
- NBA draft: 2005: 2nd round, 35th overall pick
- Drafted by: Portland Trail Blazers
- Playing career: 2005–2022
- Position: Power forward / center

Career history
- 2001: Brujos de Guayama
- 2002–2004: Criollos de Caguas
- 2004–2005: IMG Academy HS
- 2005–2007: Idaho Stampede
- 2007–2009: Grises de Humacao
- 2009–2010: Halcones Rojos Veracruz
- 2010–2012: Cangrejeros de Santurce
- 2012–2013: Indios de Mayaguez
- 2013–2014: Regatas Corrientes
- 2014: Cangrejeros de Santurce
- 2015: Atenienses de Manatí
- 2015–2016: ICL Manresa
- 2016–2017: Fuerza Regia Monterrey
- 2017–2018: Quilmes Mar del Plata
- 2018–2019: Capitanes de Arecibo
- 2019–2020: Cariduros de Fajardo
- 2020–2021: Real Estelí
- 2022: Grises de Humacao

Career highlights
- 2× BSN champion (2012, 2019); 4× BSN All-Star (2008–2011); BSN Most Improved Player (2011)
- Stats at Basketball Reference
Medals
Men's basketball
Representing Puerto Rico
FIBA AmeriCup
Silver medal – second place	2009 San Juan
Silver medal – second place	2013 Venezuela
Bronze medal – third place	2007 Las Vegas
Centrobasket
Gold medal – first place	2010 Dominican Republic
Gold medal – first place	2016 Panama
Central American and Caribbean Games
Gold medal – first place	2010 Mayagüez
Pan American Games
Bronze medal – third place	2007 Rio de Janeiro
FIBA CBC Championship
Gold medal – first place	2007 Caguas
FIBA Americas U20 Championship
Silver medal – second place	2004 Canada	Under-20

Ricardo "Ricky" Sánchez Rosa (born July 6, 1987) is a Puerto Rican professional basketball player who most recently played for Grises de Humacao of the Baloncesto Superior Nacional (BSN). He was drafted by the Portland Trail Blazers out of IMG Academy with the 35th pick of the 2005 NBA draft, becoming the fourth Puerto Rican to be drafted by the National Basketball Association, and was immediately traded to the Denver Nuggets for their selection, Jarrett Jack. He has played for the Puerto Rican national basketball team. He is the last player to be drafted by the NBA while still a minor, drafted 8 days before his 18th birthday.

Sánchez was later traded to the Philadelphia 76ers on September 10, 2007. The 76ers traded the rights to Sánchez on March 15, 2012, for Memphis Grizzlies forward Sam Young. This move inspired the name of Michael Levin and Spike Eskin's Sixers podcast, "Rights to Ricky Sanchez", commonly referred to as "The Ricky". On February 21, 2013, international rights to Sánchez were traded to the Miami Heat for center Dexter Pittman and a 2013 second round draft pick in an attempt to clear roster space for the Heat.

He has played with the Idaho Stampede in the NBA Development League and the Continental Basketball Association, and in the National Superior Basketball League of Puerto Rico, with teams including the Criollos de Caguas, Humacao Grays, Santurce Crabbers, and the Mayaguez Indians, with whom he won a championship in 2012.

== Career statistics ==
=== Domestic leagues ===
Season	Team	League	GP	MPG	FG%	3P%	FT%	RPG	APG	SPG	BPG	PPG
2001	Criollos de Caguas	BSN	7	?	.500	.427	--	.1	.1	?	?	1.9
2002	Criollos de Caguas	BSN	9	?	.427	.270	--	.4	.6	?	?	2.0
2006–07	Idaho Stampede	D-League	51	28.4	.454	.362	.744	4.3	1.7	.6	.7	11.6
2007	Caciques de Humacao	BSN	9	?	.480	.420	.680	5.9	1.6	?	?	12.8
2007–08	Idaho Stampede	D-League	24	20.1	.441	.446	.500	2.5	1.0	.8	.4	7.6
2008	Caciques de Humacao	BSN	28	?	.420	.330	.710	5.4	1.8	?	?	11.9
2009	Cangrejeros de Santurce	BSN	32	21.7	.402	.415	.737	4.6	.9	.5	.9	7.6
2009–10	Halcones Rojos	Mexico LNBP	51	23.8	.416	.349	.796	3.7	1.9	.8	.1	9.3
2010	Cangrejeros de Santurce	BSN	36	29.5	.350	.392	.689	4.5	1.3	1.3	.4	10.6
2010–11	Halcones Rojos	Mexico LNBP	2	24.5	.222	.333	1.000	3.5	.0	2.5	.0	5.5
2011	Cangrejeros de Santurce	BSN	37	32.6	.482	.303	.802	6.1	2.1	.9	1.9	15.5
2011–12	Estudiantes de Bahía Blanca	Argentina LNB	51	29.8	.458	.326	.723	5.1	1.9	.9	.8	12.8
2012	Indios de Mayagüez	BSN	23	23.5	.375	.384	.629	3.4	1.4	.4	.8	7.3
2012–13	Libertad Sunchales	Argentina LNB	40	31.2	.460	.385	.754	6.9	1.7	.5	.8	12.0
2013	Cangrejeros de Santurce	BSN	42	27.4	.452	.425	.776	4.6	2.4	.9	1.0	10.7
2013–14	Regatas Corrientes	Argentina LNB	52	27.6	.467	.384	.764	4.9	1.6	.8	.7	9.5
2014	Cangrejeros de Santurce	BSN	13	23.7	.361	.318	.864	3.4	2.5	.9	.4	6.7
2015	Atenienses de Manatí	BSN	49	33.5	.425	.387	.725	6.6	1.9	.9	.7	15.4

== See also ==
- Puerto Rico Men's National Basketball Team
- Peter John Ramos Puerto Rican Center with a height of 7 ft 3.5 in
- J. J. Barea Team Puerto Rico Point Guard and current Team Captain
- Elías Larry Ayuso
- Carlos Arroyo Former Team Puerto Rico Point Guard & NBA player
- Jorge Brian Díaz Team Puerto Rico Center
