= Don Tollefson =

American television broadcast journalist (born 1952)

Don Tollefson (born September 14, 1952) is an American television broadcast journalist, best known for his work as a sportscaster for the Philadelphia local ABC affiliate WPVI-TV from 1975 to 1990. He also worked for Philadelphia's local FOX affiliate, WTXF-TV. He worked briefly as a sideline reporter for the NFL on FOX and hosted a radio show on ESPN Radio 950 AM.

== Early life ==
Donald H "Don" Tollefson was born in San Francisco in 1952. He was the younger of two sons. His parents were separated when he was young. He attended the Menlo School where he graduated magna cum laude.

== Career ==
Tollefson attended Stanford University where he was the editor of the student newspaper. He was hired by the Associated Press as a young correspondent covering the Patty Hearst kidnapping and trial. In the fall of 1974, Tollefson was hired (along with Jim Lampley) as a football sideline reporter for ABC Sports. From there he was hired by ABC's Philadelphia local affiliate where he spent the bulk of his broadcasting career.

=== WPVI-TV ABC 6 Philadelphia ===
Tollefson was hired as a general correspondent for Action News on WPVI-TV in Philadelphia in 1975. He was named Sports Director in 1976. During his tenure at ABC 6, Tollefson covered some of Philadelphia sports history's most exciting moments. Notable among them:

- The Phillies' 1980 World Series Championship and 1983 World Series appearance, as well as their 1976, 1977, and 1978 Eastern Division Champion seasons.
- The Eagles' 1980 NFC Championship and their 1988 NFC East Division Championship
- The Flyers' 1975 Stanley Cup Championship, as well as their '76-'77, '79-'80, '84-'85, and '86-'87 Conference Championships.
- The 76ers' 1983 NBA Championship, as well as their 1977, 1980, and 1982 Conference Titles.

In 1990, Tollefson announced that he was leaving ABC to start a non-profit organization designed to work with youths to avoid drug abuse, truancy and criminal behavior.

=== "Winning Ways" ===
Tollefson moved to Greensboro, NC following his 1st departure from broadcast journalism in 1990. There he registered his non-profit organization, "Winning Ways" for which he traveled to schools across the country giving motivational talks.

=== WTXF Fox 29 Philadelphia ===
In 1995, Tollefson returned to television broadcasting as a general assignment reporter for FOX's Philadelphia local affiliate, WTXF Fox 29. In addition to general reporting, Tollefson covered sports news and events as well as co-hosted Fox Philadelphia's morning show Good Day Philadelphia from 1996 to 1998. Tollefson was fired from WTXF in 2008.

== Personal life ==
=== Marriages and Children ===
Tollefson married his first wife, Monica Vasquez, in 1992. They were married for a short time. After his return to Philadelphia, Tollefson married his second wife, Marilyn (née Torres). She gave birth to their only child, Gabriella Laura on February 29, 2008.

On 08/29/2020 Tollefson and his fiancée; then Heidi Schaffer Fetter, respectively, exchanged vows and wed at the Historic Landis Store Hotel in Berks County, Pennsylvania.

Both Mr. and Mrs. Don Tollefson reside in Allentown, Pennsylvania as of 2020.

Tollefson once dated NBC Today Show reporter Jenna Wolfe

=== Troubles With Alcoholism and Addiction ===
In 2013, Tollefson confirmed to several news outlets that he was battling a decades-long alcohol abuse problem and an addiction to prescription pain killers after a 2008 automobile accident. In October 2013, he checked himself into an inpatient rehab facility.

Tollefson had begun drinking at the age of 16 and says he "got drunk every night" from then until age 61. He admitted to drinking before going on the air and was once pulled off the air by a manager because he was visibly intoxicated.

In January 2015, he told a Philadelphia Daily News reporter that he had been clean for 468 days.

== Fraud Trial ==
=== Initial Allegations ===
In October 2013, allegations began to surface that Tollefson had been defrauding individuals and charities for payment for trips to large sporting events. He was accused of selling packages including tickets, travel and accommodations to events like the Super Bowl and then never delivering the packages or delivering incompletely. In most cases, these packages were sold under the guise of benefiting various charities for which Tollefson purported to be an advocate. Those charities did not receive the funds Tollefson was paid for the packages he never delivered.

=== Arrest ===
In February 2014, Tollefson was arrested and arraigned in Bucks County District Court. He was charged with unlawful activity, theft by unlawful taking, theft by deception, and violations of the Pennsylvania charitable organizations statute. Some of the details of the charges were as follows:

- On October 8, 2013, Tollefson sold 18 Eagles game trip packages for $500 at a memorial run for Plymouth Township Police officer Brad Fox, who had been killed in the line of duty. Tollefson claimed that the money would be split between his own charities and the Brad Fox Foundation. The Fox Foundation never received any money
- Tollefson met several Lehigh Valley business owners following a charity event and sold them a trip package to the 2013 Super Bowl including flights, hotels and game tickets. Flight arrangements never were made and the package purchasers had to pay for flights on top of the monies paid to Tollefson.
- In total, Tollefson was accused of stealing over $340,000 from more than 100 individual people.

=== Change of Plea/New Found Faith ===
On December 15, 2014, Tollefson was scheduled to be sentenced following his originally entered plea of guilty. However, Tollefson requested to withdraw his guilty plea, change to not guilty and be permitted to represent himself at his trial. He claimed to have been praying with pastors, ministers and a rabbi and said that “I believe I am innocent of the charges...and I have learned that through prayer.”

On December 22, 2014, Tollefson held a press conference to announce that he no longer wished to represent himself and had been applying to be represented by a public defender. Those applications were denied.

=== Trial ===
Jury selection in Tollefson's trial began on January 5, 2015. Among Tollefson's claims of innocence was that he never aimed to defraud people, but was only a "bad businessman." He also claimed that none of the money he received was spent on himself or his family.

On January 21, 2015, Tollefson was found guilty on all counts. The jury deliberated for 10 hours over the course of two days. Prosecutors afterward said that they would be seeking "lengthy" prison time for Tollefson at sentencing He was ultimately sentenced to two to four years in state prison. Tollefson must also serve 15 years of probation.

Tollefson was released in late 2017 after serving 14 months of his sentence.
