= Bill Campbell (sportscaster) =

American sportscaster

Campbell

Bill Campbell (September 7, 1923 – October 6, 2014) was a sportscaster in the Philadelphia area. He was born in the Logan section of North Philadelphia.

Campbell began his broadcasting career in high school at multi-ethnic WTEL, a Philadelphia radio station. He moved to Lancaster, Pennsylvania in 1941 as a Minor League Baseball announcer, and then settled in Philadelphia, in 1942, where he lived the rest of his life. Campbell first started in area radio at WIP, before moving to WCAU in 1946 as sports director, taking the same position when WCAU-TV began its historic telecasts, in 1948; he remained in that position until 1966.

Campbell was play-by-play announcer for the Philadelphia Warriors from their debut in 1946 until their move to San Francisco in 1962, calling Wilt Chamberlain's 100-point game. He was also play-by-play announcer for the Philadelphia Eagles from 1952 to 1966, Philadelphia Phillies from 1963 to 1970, and Philadelphia 76ers from 1972 to 1981.

Campbell later held down the 10 AM to noon slot at his first Delaware Valley broadcasting employer, WIP, when it switched to an all-sports format, from 1987 to 1991.

The Broadcast Pioneers of Philadelphia inducted Campbell into their Hall of Fame in 1999 and named him their Person of the Year in 2008.

Campbell was awarded the Curt Gowdy Media Award by the Basketball Hall of Fame in 2005. He died on October 6, 2014, aged 91, at a hospital in Camden, New Jersey.

On February 1, 2016, the inaugural Bill Campbell Broadcast Award was presented by the Philadelphia Sports Writers Association, to longtime Eagles announcer Merrill Reese.
