= WCHE =

- West Chester, Pennsylvania; United States
- Broadcast area: Chester County, Pennsylvania
- Frequency: 1520 kHz
- Branding: WCHE 1520AM 95.3 WCHE

Programming
- Format: Talk radio

Ownership
- Owner: Jay Shur; (Chester County Radio, Inc.)

History
- First air date: 1963; 63 years ago
- Call sign meaning: West Chester

Technical information
- Licensing authority: FCC
- Facility ID: 71279
- Class: D
- Power: 1,000 watts (day); 800 watts (critical hours)
- Transmitter coordinates: 39°57′58.39″N 75°37′53.76″W
- Translator: See § Translator

Links
- Public license information: Public file; LMS
- Website: 953wche.com

WCHE (1520 AM, "WCHE 1520AM") is a commercial AM radio station licensed to serve West Chester, Pennsylvania. The station is owned by Jay Shur through licensee Chester County Radio, Inc. and airs a talk radio format.

WCHE powered by 1,000 watts is licensed as a daytimer AM, permitted to transmit from sunrise to sunset. This requires the station to be off the air during the nighttime hours because it interferes with the same frequency as clear-channel station WWKB in Buffalo, New York. Its programming is also heard on 215-watt FM translator W237EW at 95.3 MHz.

== Translator ==
WCHE programming is simulcast on the following translator:

Call sign	Frequency	City of license	FID	ERP (W)	HAAT	Class	Transmitter coordinates	FCC info
W237EW	95.3 FM	West Chester, Pennsylvania	200394	240	6 m (20 ft)	D	39°57′58.7″N 75°37′50.0″W	LMS
