= Spike Eskin =

American radio personality (born 1976)

- Born: Brett Michael Eskin; August 7, 1976 (age 50)
- Education: Syracuse University (BS)
- Parent: Howard Eskin (father)
- Presenting career
- Show: WIP Afternoon Show (2024–present)
- Station: WIP-FM
- Time slot: 2:00–6:00 p.m. ET; Monday–Friday
- Country: United States

Brett Michael "Spike" Eskin (born August 7, 1976) is an American radio personality who currently serves as a host for WIP-FM in Philadelphia. He previously served as the program director for WIP and WFAN-FM in New York City. Eskin is also the co-creator and co-host of Rights to Ricky Sanchez, a podcast covering the Philadelphia 76ers.

== Early life and education ==
Eskin was born on August 7, 1976, to a Jewish family and grew up in Glen Mills, Pennsylvania. His father, Howard Eskin, is a longtime Philadelphia sports media personality who worked at WIP from 1986 until 2024. Eskin graduated from Episcopal Academy in 1994. He attended the University of Southern California, but later transferred to Syracuse University, where he graduated in 1998 with a degree in broadcast journalism from the Newhouse School of Public Communications. At Syracuse, Eskin worked at the university's student-run radio station, WJPZ-FM. It was at WJPZ that Eskin developed his nickname of "Spike" due to having spiky hair.

== Career ==
Eskin began his professional career as a disc jockey at WYSP-FM, which at that time was a hard rock station. He then moved to alternative rock station WKQX in Chicago, where he later became their music director. Eskin moved back to WYSP in 2007, serving as a midday host and later the assistant program director. After WYSP changed formats to sports in 2011, Eskin entered sports radio and joined WIP-FM as a fill-in host and social media manager, while also serving roles as a sports editor for CBS Philadelphia and a sports reporter for KYW.

In 2013, Eskin and television writer Michael Levin created the Rights to Ricky Sanchez podcast. The podcast covers the Philadelphia 76ers, and is a reference to former 76ers prospect Ricky Sánchez.

In 2014, Eskin became the program director at WIP. He also briefly served as a co-host on WIP's afternoon show, but left the on-air role in 2016 to focus as program director. Eskin served as program director until 2021, when he departed to take on the same role at WIP's sister station, WFAN-FM, in New York City. In the new role for parent company Audacy, Inc., he would also oversee programming for CBS Sports Radio.

In January 2024, it was announced that Eskin would be leaving WFAN to return to WIP in Philadelphia and become the co-host of the WIP Afternoon Show alongside Ike Reese and Jack Fritz. Eskin debuted on the new WIP Afternoon Show in April 2024.
