= Steve Hartman (sportscaster) =

American sportscaster

Steven Ward Hartman (born July 4, 1958 in Hollywood, California) is the host of multiple national shows for the Fox Sports Radio Network. In addition, he is a sports anchor/reporter on KTLA television in Los Angeles. He held a similar position at KCBS/KCAL from 1998 through 2010. In 2026, Hartman was inducted into the Southern California Sports Broadcasters Hall of Fame.

== Career ==
For more than three decades Hartman has served as a writer, team executive, and broadcaster. He has covered 26 Super Bowls, 16 Final Fours and six MLB All-Star games. In addition, he worked as the radio color commentator UCLA Bruins football for two seasons, earning a finalist nomination in 1996 for "Best Radio Analyst" by the Southern California Sports Broadcasters Association. Hartman served seven years as the color analyst for ESPN's coverage of the Toyota Pro/Celebrity Race at the Grand Prix of Long Beach. He also co-wrote the book (with Matt "Money" Smith) entitled "The Great Book of Los Angeles Sports Lists".

=== Early career ===
Hartman first gained notice as the Daily Bruin sports editor where he earned West Coast collegiate honors for his coverage of the 1980 Final Four. Following graduation Hartman worked for three years at KABC Radio in Los Angeles as an assistant producer for the station's afternoon sports show. This was followed by a four-year run as media relations/publications director for the Los Angeles Raiders. Hartman was also editor of the Los Angeles Rams publication Rampages as well as magazines covering the Raiders, Dodgers and UCLA sports. In February 1989, Hartman began his sports radio career at KFOX in Los Angeles.

A year later he helped launch XTRA Sports Radio in San Diego, the first all-sports radio station in Southern California, with the show The Loose Cannons, where he worked with former Monday Night Football director Chet Forte. After Forte's unexpected death, Hartman continued the show with "Philly" Billy Werndl.

=== Awards ===
In 2002, 2007, 2009, 2010 and 2012 the SCSBA named Hartman as a finalist for "Best Radio Talk Show Host", making him the first person nominated as both a radio host and color analyst. He was also a 2004 inductee into the Southern California Jewish Sports Hall of Fame. Hartman and his colleagues at KCBS were honored as the best local sports television team by the SCSBA on six occasions (1999-2001; 2003-2004; 2008).

Hartman has a Heisman Trophy vote.
