= Jim Gallagher (American football) =

American football executive (1929–2017)

Personal information
- Born: July 29, 1929; Philadelphia, Pennsylvania
- Died: August 4, 2017 (aged 88); Plymouth Meeting, Pennsylvania

Career information
- High school: Northeast Catholic (Philadelphia, Pennsylvania)

Career history
- Philadelphia Eagles (1949–1995)

Awards and highlights
- 2× NFL champion (1949, 1960); Philadelphia Eagles Hall of Fame

James Gallagher (July 19, 1929 – August 4, 2017) was an American football executive who worked for the Philadelphia Eagles of the National Football League (NFL) from 1949 to 1995.

After graduating from Northeast Catholic High School in Philadelphia, Pennsylvania, Gallagher worked for the Pennsylvania Railroad. He was hired by the Eagles as a stenographer in September 1949. He served in the United States Army during the Korean War, and later became the Eagles' director of personnel in 1957. He held the position of director of public relations for the team for almost 20 years, and was also the director of sales and marketing. He moved to a position arranging travel details for the team by 1989, and added a title of director of alumni relations in 1990. He retired from the Eagles on August 1, 1995. He was inducted into the Philadelphia Eagles Honor Roll alongside wide receiver Mike Quick at halftime of the Eagles' game against the New York Giants on November 19, 1995.

Gallagher died on August 4, 2017, at the age of 88.
