= Howard Eskin =

American sports radio personality (born 1951)

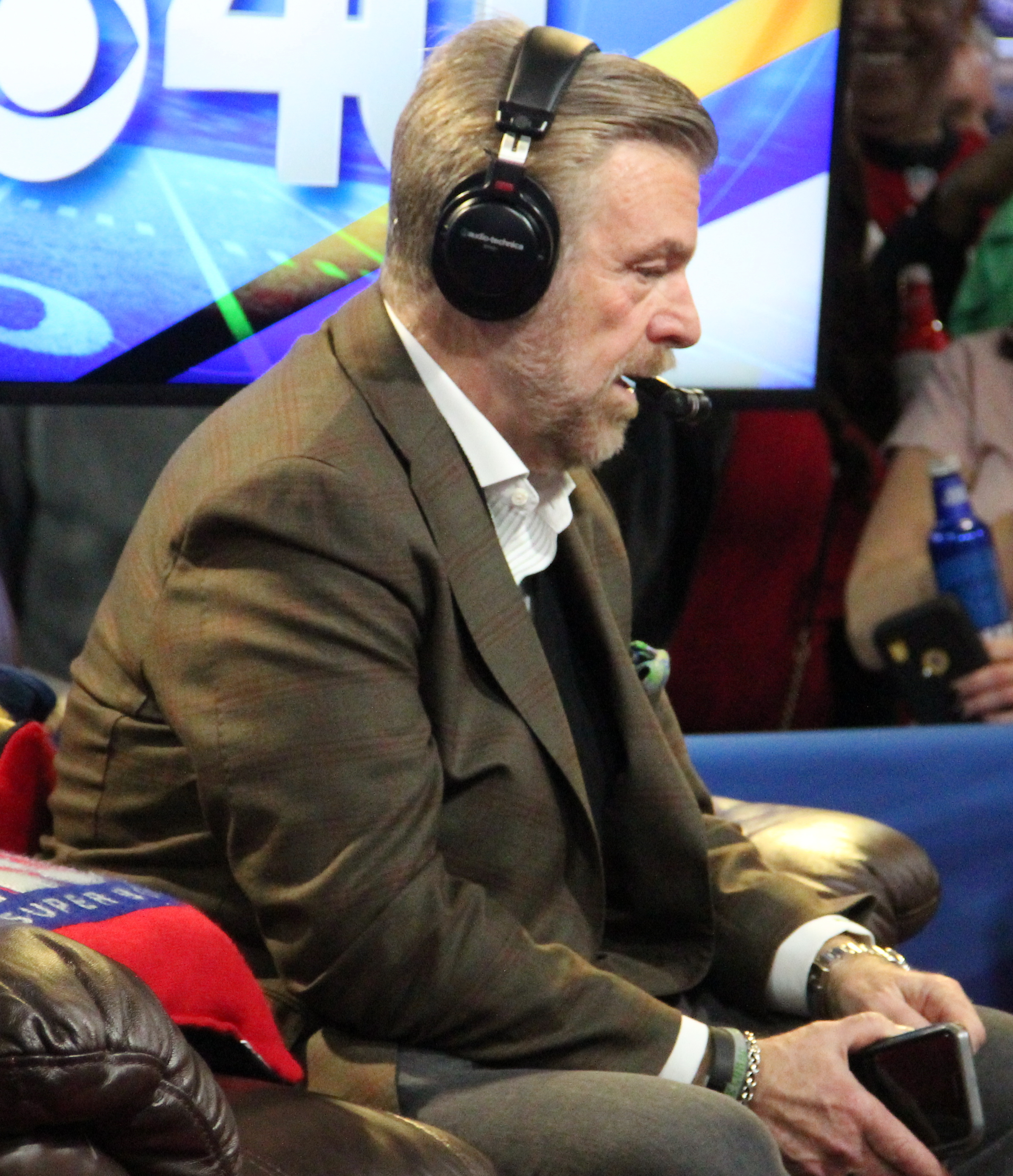
- Born: April 29, 1951 (age 75); Philadelphia, Pennsylvania, U.S.
- Occupation: Sports radio personality
- Children: 5, including Spike

Howard Eskin (born April 29, 1951) is an American sports commentator, formerly a host for sports radio station WIP-FM (94.1) and a contributor to WTXF-TV (channel 29) in Philadelphia. He also worked as a sideline reporter for the Philadelphia Eagles Radio Network.

Eskin has broadcast more than 8,000 sports radio programs in his career, which is the most by any sports radio personality in American history.

== Early life ==
Eskin spent his first eight years growing up in Mt. Airy, Philadelphia. He then moved to Rhawnhurst, Philadelphia and lived there until he graduated from high school. He attended Northeast High School in Philadelphia where he graduated in 1968. He grew up as a fan of playing, and watching, sports including baseball, football, and basketball. He is Jewish.

== Career ==
Eskin got his start in local radio at WFIL in 1972 when evening shift disc jockey George Michael hired him to be his engineer.

In 1982, Eskin joined KYW-TV as a sports anchor. Eskin joined WIP in 1986 when it converted to a full-time sports radio format, and was behind the mic for its first program. Eskin's years on the air allowed him to frequently have special guest athletes or other sports figures on his program, with memorable interactions with Charles Barkley, Freddie Mitchell, Terrell Owens, Lenny Dykstra, Andre Iguodala, Bernard Hopkins, Jayson Werth and Cole Hamels.

In 1992, Eskin co-hosted with John DeBella on a re-tooled version of WMMR's Morning zoo advertised as "Sports Rock". The collaboration was unsuccessful and ended by 1994. On television Eskin helped launch WTXF-TV's Ten O’Clock News as the station's original sports director from 1986 to 1991.

In 1992, he rejoined KYW-TV and then WCAU-TV in 1996, where he served as a host and contributor to Sports Final until April 2005. In addition to his radio and television presence, Eskin wrote a column for the Philadelphia Daily News in the early 1990s. He also previously served as a contributor to The George Michael Sports Machine, ESPN's First Take, The Dan Patrick Show and The NFL Network.

On September 20, 2007, Eskin logged his 5,000th radio show, more than anyone else in the country at the time, and celebrated his 25th year in television that same year. Guests on the show included Charles Barkley, Terrell Owens, and Billy Cunningham.

On September 2, 2011, he hosted his last 3:00 to 7:00 PM show on WIP after nearly 6,000 shows and 25 years in that slot.

In 2012, Eskin returned to WTXF as a contributor to the station's coverage of Eagles football (of which it carries most of the team's games through its network package).

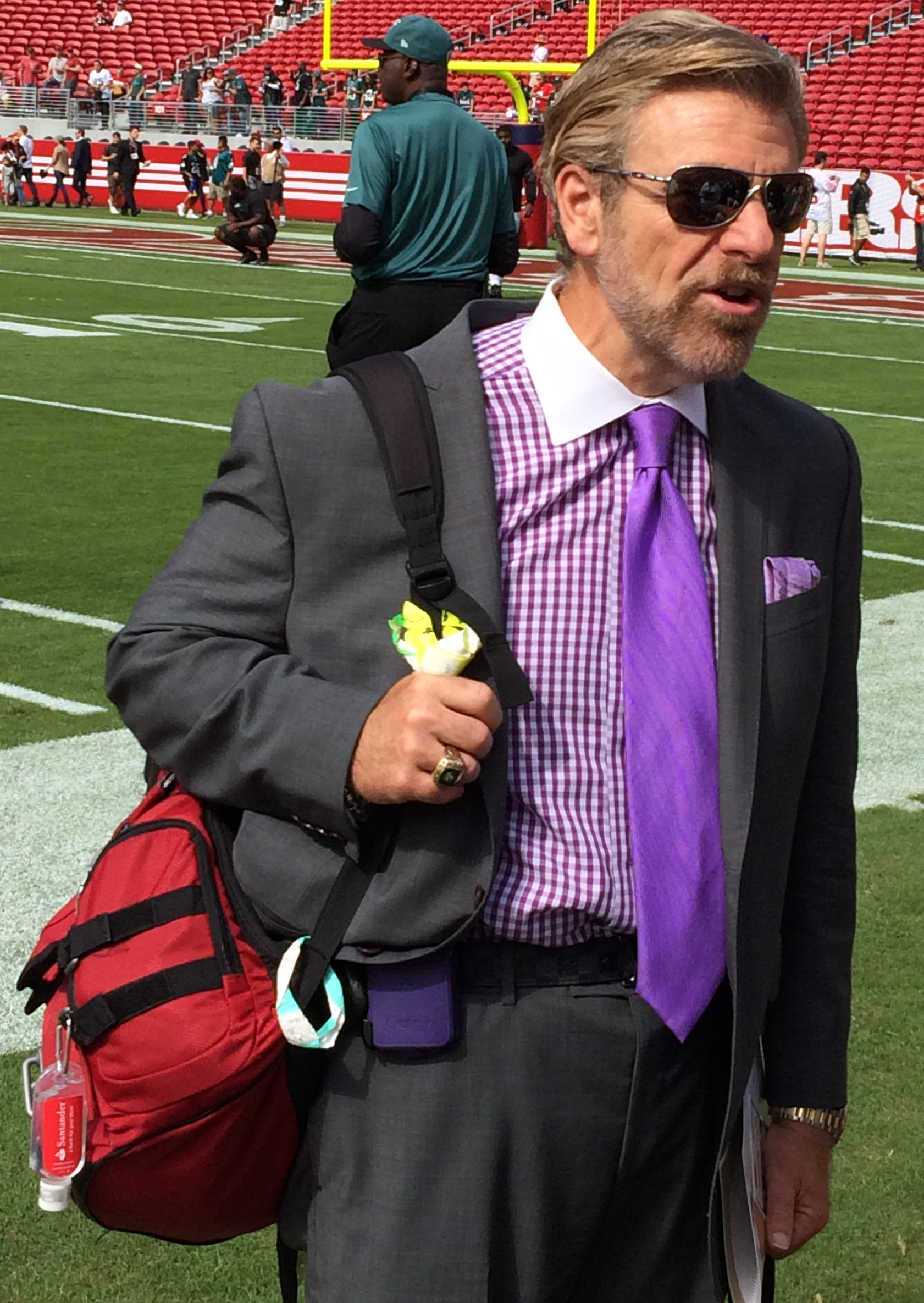
Eskin in 2014

=== Notable reports ===
While at KYW-TV, Eskin broke the story of Eagles owner Leonard Tose having personal financial trouble and therefore considering selling the team to buyers who would move the team. According to KYW-TV manager, Frank Traynor, "If [Eskin] had not stepped in when he did, Leonard Tose would have snuck the Eagles out of town."

Eskin's breaking stories included one that former Philadelphia Phillies general manager Ed Wade would be fired if the Phillies did not make the playoffs. Wade was subsequently fired by the Phillies on October 10, 2005. He unsuccessfully "campaigned" for the GM position that was eventually filled by former Toronto Blue Jays GM Pat Gillick.

Eskin also covered the negotiation and subsequent breakdown between Comcast and a group led by Julius Erving and Will Smith to buy the Philadelphia 76ers. His involvement in the negotiation entailed a request for help from Allen L. Rothenberg, a prominent Philadelphia attorney, who was a regular at Eskin's synagogue.

== On-air personality at WIP ==
Though Eskin regularly initiates calls with comments such as "never had a bad day in my life" or "another day in paradise", he is known to be short-tempered and easily angered on his radio show. He frequently refers to a caller as a "genius" or "chief" (both sarcastically), a "dope", an "idiot", a "nitwit", a "creep" or a "moron".

Eskin has also been known to lead long-term "campaigns" to have players traded from Philadelphia teams such as former Philadelphia Phillies' outfielder Bobby Abreu for alleged lackadaisical defense and lack of clutch hitting, and Sixers' guard Allen Iverson for his allegedly selfish play, though he has subsequently praised Iverson. Eskin's last public stunt was organizing a mock funeral to celebrate Terrell Owens's demise with the Philadelphia Eagles during their 2005 season.

He refers to Dallas Cowboys' fans as "cock-a-roaches" and will tell callers if they are worried about their team then they should "get a dog." He also refers to the Pittsburgh Steelers as the "Stillers" and stereotypes their fans as IronCity beer drinkers, smokers, and generally of a low-class demeanor.

Prior to the legalization of sports gambling in Pennsylvania, Eskin was known for having an affinity towards sports gambling on air. On Friday afternoons during football season, he often would ask a "handicapping expert" on as a guest. In addition, he is the self-proclaimed "King of Monday Night" due to his successful track record in picking Monday Night Football games correctly. On his current Saturday show during the NFL season, he reviews and picks games with Marc Lawrence, a sports handicapper.

Eskin announced on social media that he left WIP on December 20, 2024.

== Controversies ==
During a 1996 controversy involving former Philadelphia Flyer Eric Lindros selling game tickets to mafia members, Eskin interviewed reputed Philly mob boss Joey Merlino about the Mafioso's sitting in Lindros's seats at a Flyers' game. Merlino denied getting the seats from Lindros.

In 2000, Eskin was suspended and forced to give an on-air apology to the organizers of the Miss America pageant for saying on the air that the contest was rigged.

During the beginning of the 2007 Phillies season, Eskin criticized the team for not taking chances with their payroll and instead running their sports franchise like a "department store". After a 3–9 start to the team's 2007 season, Eskin had a confrontation with manager Charlie Manuel, implying that Manuel was not tough enough on his players. Manuel responded by threatening to fight Eskin, and had to be physically restrained by hitting coach Milt Thompson.

In July 2024, The Philadelphia Inquirer reported that Audacy, the parent company of WIP, had banned Eskin from Citizens Bank Park for the remainder of the Phillies' season after an incident in May in which Eskin made an "unwanted advance" toward a female Aramark employee working at the stadium. Shortly after the report was released, the Philadelphia 76ers announced that they were revoking Eskin's access to their training complex and would not allow Eskin to attend Sixers home games at the Wells Fargo Center "until further notice". Although Audacy did not publicly announce any further disciplinary action taken against Eskin, he did not appear on his weekly Saturday morning show for three weeks. In his return to his show, Eskin briefly acknowledged the incident and publicly apologized, stating: "I apologized to [the employee] at the time of the incident and I apologize again now. I’m truly sorry that this did occur".

== Personal life ==
Eskin's nickname, "King", was given to him by Pete Rose. The Broadcast Pioneers of Philadelphia inducted Eskin into their Hall of Fame in 2011.

Eskin often touts his affinity for a wardrobe that includes expensive jewelry and clothing, particularly fur coats for Eagles home games. He has been nicknamed "The King of Bling". Eskin sold a bobblehead doll of him wearing a fur coat, with the proceeds going to charity, in 2004 and 2005, which raised $75,000 for charity. The first 100 dolls in the 2005 version came with a special small diamond chip in his "bling" necklace.

In 1997, Eskin was revealed as the "prominent Philadelphia sportscaster" who had sent a dozen roses to a woman five days before she was murdered by her husband. The woman had posted a fake profile on a dating site, identifying herself as a 25-year-old named "Brandice". A note sent with the roses was read during the guilty plea of Raymond Stumpf by his attorney: "Dear Brandice It was absolutely wonderful getting to know you. Hope to get to know you better. You were very thought-provoking and I do love your name. Love, Howard". Eskin subsequently denied ever meeting with her and said the roses were nothing more than an innocent attempt to brighten a lonely woman's day. At his sentencing, in Montgomery County Court, Raymond Stumpf stated "I think the worst part was probably the day the roses came." Stumpf was sentenced to a term of 7 1/2 to 15 years for the killing.

Eskin's son Brett "Spike" Eskin was a radio DJ on Philadelphia station WYSP. Spike later worked as the brand manager at WIP and then served as vice president of programming at WFAN in New York City. He returned to WIP in 2024.

=== Philanthropy and activism ===
Eskin has sponsored numerous charity and fund-raising events off-the-air to benefit particular humanitarian cause throughout the year. He has helped raise $400,000 for the Eagles Autism Foundation and organized bike-riding fundraisers to raise awareness for autism. Eskin has also raised more than $100,000 in funds for the Brandywine Valley SPCA and Providence Animal Centers and organized fundraising drives for the victims of Hurricane Katrina.

On the air, he has advocated for issues such as public smoking bans and medical tort reform.

Eskin was named "Man of the Year" by the Leukemia and Lymphoma Society named and the March of Dimes "Media Person of the Year" in 2003. In 2010, Eskin was given the March of Dimes Lifetime Achievement Award for Achievement in Radio.
