= Merrill Reese =

American sports announcer (born 1942)

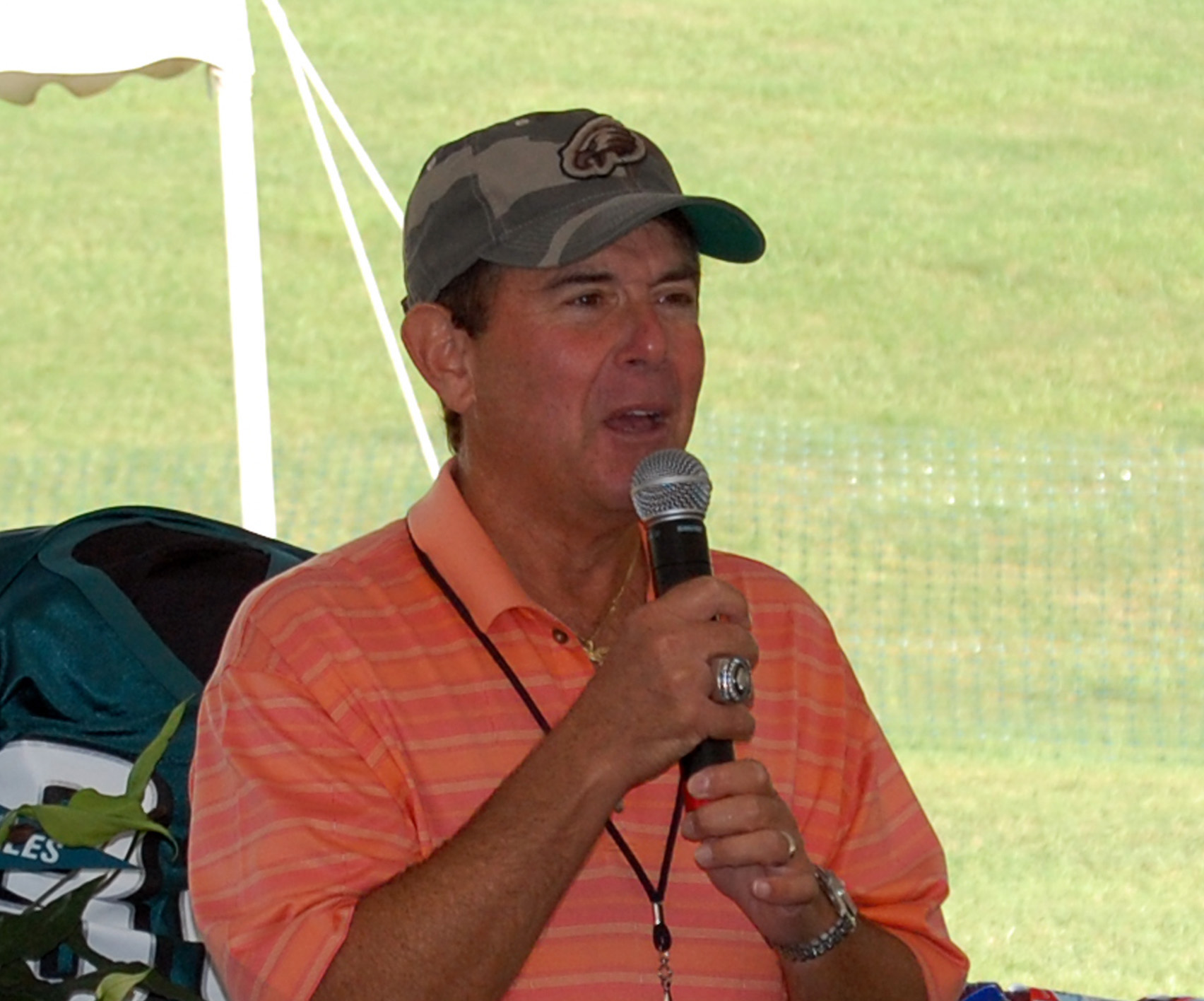
- Reese in August 2008 at Eagles Training Camp
- Born: Merrill Alan Reese; September 2, 1942 (age 83); Philadelphia, Pennsylvania, U.S.
- Sports commentary career
- Team: Philadelphia Eagles (1977–present)
- Genre: Play-by-Play
- Sport: Football

Merrill Alan Reese (born September 2, 1942) is an American sports radio announcer best known for his role as the play-by-play radio announcer for the Philadelphia Eagles on SportsRadio 94.1 WIP-FM. He has been the voice of the Eagles since 1977. He is the 2024 recipient of the Pete Rozelle Radio-Television Award.

== Early years ==
Reese grew up in Overbrook Park, Philadelphia and attended Overbrook High School. He is Jewish.

Reese is a graduate of Temple University, earning a bachelor's degree in communications and broadcasting. While in college, he learned his craft by doing play-by-play over the college's radio station, WRTI FM. At WRTI, Reese also had a music show every Wednesday afternoon where he spun 45-rpm records from his own personal collection.

After college, he served as a public affairs officer in the United States Navy and became a lieutenant. He then set out to obtain his first paid broadcasting gig auditioning at WCOJ in Coatesville, Pennsylvania, and WPAZ in Pottstown, Pennsylvania.

== Radio career ==
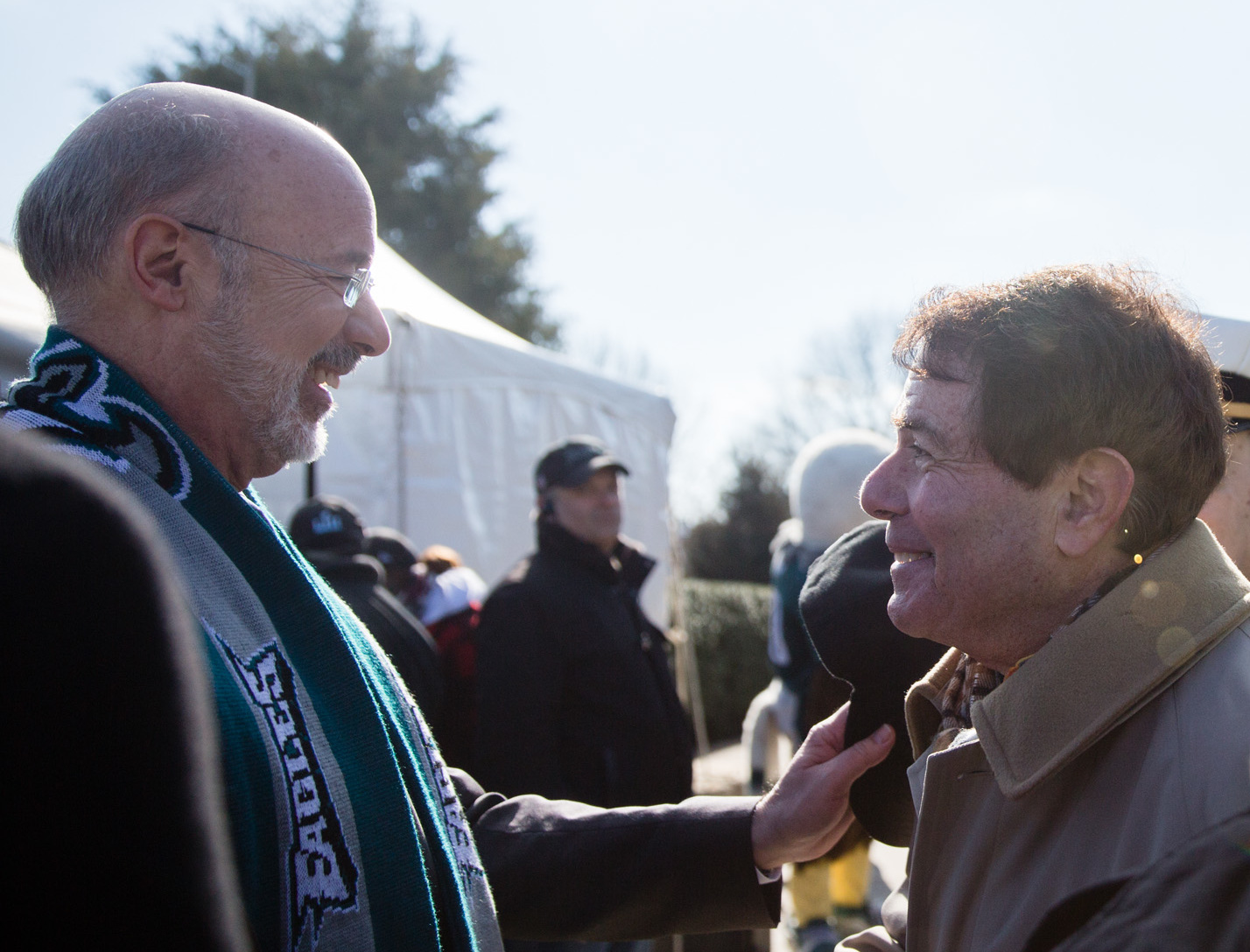
Reese with Pennsylvania Governor Tom Wolf in 2018

Reese eventually landed a job in Philadelphia as a newscaster and sportscaster at WHAT and its FM companion, WWDB-FM. After a few years he moved on to WIP as a backup for that station's Sports Director, Charlie Swift, who did drive-time sportscasts and Philadelphia Eagles play-by-play. While Swift was vacationing, Reese began doing the pre-game and post-game shows for the Eagles on WIP and later was assigned to do color commentary during the games. Hours after Swift died from suicide on December 7, 1977, Reese was immediately promoted to Eagles play-by-play voice. His debut in that capacity was a 17–14 home victory over the New York Giants four days later on December 11. Herb Adderley took over the color commentary for the remainder of the season. Reese was re-hired for the 1978 season and has held the position ever since.

He is the longest-serving current play-by-play announcer in the NFL. Reese's current broadcast partner is former Eagles wide receiver Mike Quick, who joined Reese in the booth in 1998. Aside from Swift and Adderley, Reese has previously been joined in the booth by Jim Barniak (1978–82), Bill Bergey (1982–83, and who also filled in when Quick had knee surgery during the 2004 preseason), and Stan Walters (1984–97).

In addition to his play-by-play radio coverage of the Eagles, Reese hosts The WIP Coach's Show the day after Eagles games with the Eagles head coach, Eagles players and other guests.

Reese was inducted to the Philadelphia Eagles Hall of Fame in 2016. He was announced on June 13, 2024, as a Pro Football Hall of Fame Inductee upon receiving the Pete Rozelle Radio-Television Award.

On Sunday, February 4, 2018, Reese called Super Bowl LII, as the Eagles defeated the New England Patriots 41–33 for their first Super Bowl title. With 38 seconds remaining in the 2nd quarter, he called the Eagles' 4th and Goal play which would later be known as the "Philly Special" thus:

"Foles in the gun. Clement to his right. Now lines up behind Foles. Foles moves to the right, and it goes directly to Clement and Clement reverses it, and it goes into the end zone...AND IT'S A TOUCHDOWN BY NICK FOLES!"

Then, in the 4th quarter, Reese called the game's final play:

"Batted around...and incomplete! And the game is over! The game is over! The Philadelphia Eagles are Super Bowl champions. Eagles fans everywhere, this is for you. Let the celebration begin!"

== Personal life ==
Reese is co-owner of 1490 WBCB (AM) in Levittown, Pennsylvania, a Bucks County suburb north of Philadelphia.

Reese's autobiography, It's Gooooood!, was published in 1998. The title is a reference to his distinctive and well recognized "field goal" call, which is usually delivered excitedly and at a high pitch that contrasts starkly with his usual baritone broadcasting voice.

In 2022, Reese provided vocals on the Christmas album A Philly Special Christmas.

Preceded by Al Pollard	Philadelphia Eagles Radio Color Commentator; 1977	Succeeded by Herb Adderley
Preceded by Charlie Swift	Philadelphia Eagles Radio Play-by-Play; 1977–present	Succeeded by Current
