= Charlie Swift (sportscaster) =

American sportscaster

Charles A. Swift was an American sportscaster who was the play-play-play announcer for the Philadelphia Eagles from 1969 to 1977.

Swift was a native of the East Stroudsburg, Pennsylvania and a graduate of Pennsylvania State University. He worked at WROD in Daytona Beach, Florida from 1959 to 1963, calling Daytona Beach Islanders (minor league baseball) and Daytona Beach Thunderbirds (minor league football) games. He then worked for WFIL and WFIL-TV, where he hosted Motor Racing Review and calling Temple Owls football games on the radio and hosted Meet The Phillies and Baseball Wrap-Up on television. In 1965, he became the sports director at WIP in Philadelphia. In 1969, he became the radio play-by-play announcer for the Philadelphia Eagles. He also called Philadelphia Big 5 basketball games alongside Al Meltzer on WPHL-TV and Philadelphia 76ers games on PRISM.

On December 6, 1977, Swift was in an automobile accident in Springfield Township, Delaware County, Pennsylvania and suffered minor injuries. Although he had been drinking, he did not appear intoxicated and was not charged or cited. He was driven to his home in Media, Pennsylvania by police and entered around 12:30 AM. He sat down at the dining-room table, lit a cigarette, read the paper, and he wrote a brief note to his wife. At 12:50 AM his wife heard a gunshot and found him slumped over the table with a handgun near his hand. His death was ruled a suicide.
