= WBCB (AM) =

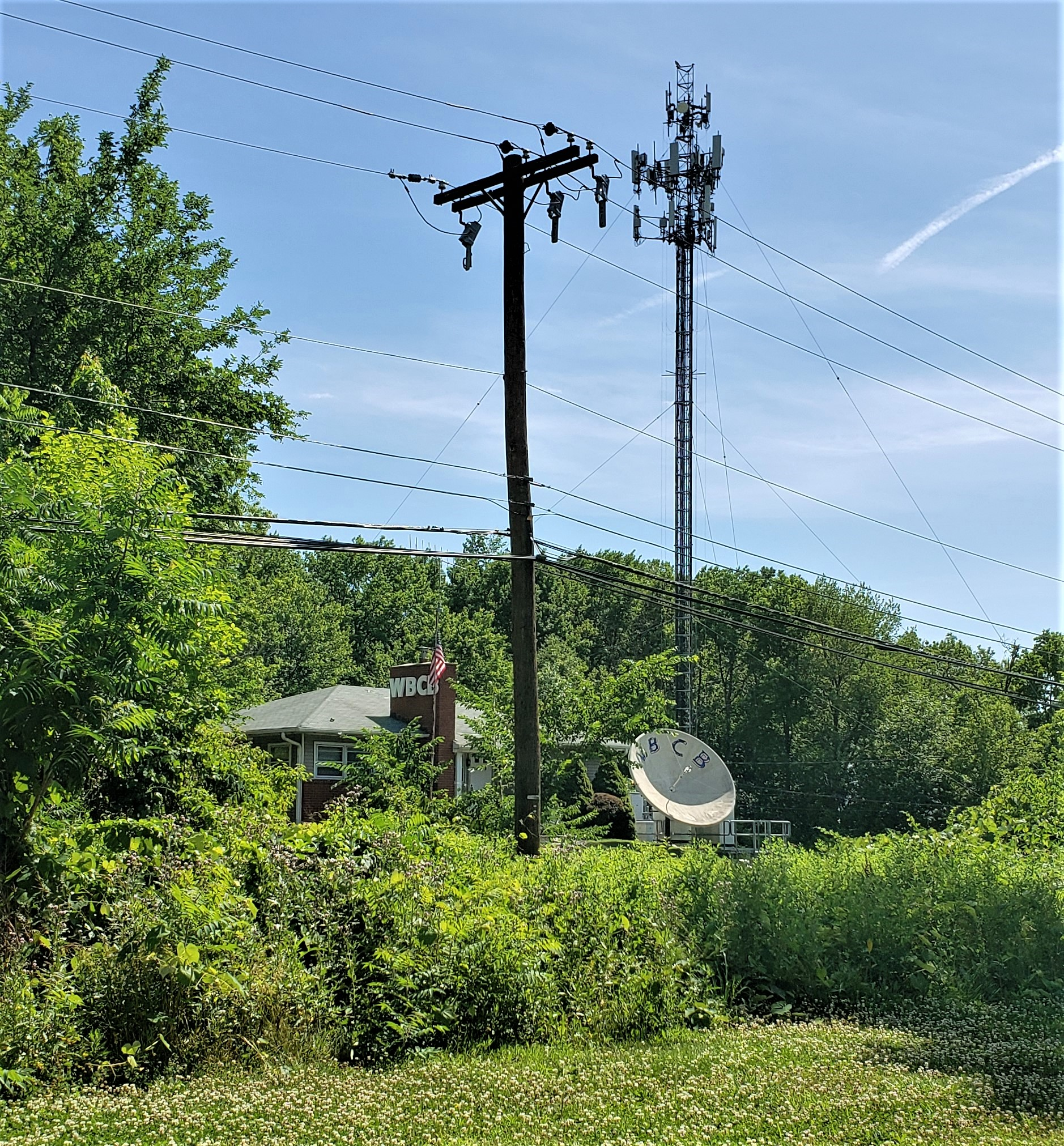
- WBCB radio station in Pennsylvania, USA
- Levittown, Pennsylvania; United States
- Broadcast area: Philadelphia metropolitan area
- Frequency: 1490 kHz
- Branding: WBCB 1490 AM

Programming
- Format: Talk/Sports

Ownership
- Owner: B & L Media Ventures, LLC

History
- First air date: December 8, 1957

Technical information
- Licensing authority: FCC
- Facility ID: 53648
- Class: C
- Power: 1,000 watts unlimited
- Transmitter coordinates: 40°10′8.4″N 74°50′6.6″W
- Translator: 107.3 W297CL (Levittown)

Links
- Public license information: Public file; LMS
- Website: www.wbcb1490.com

WBCB (1490 kHz) is a radio station licensed to serve Levittown, Pennsylvania. Its programming mixes talk and local sports.

On March 13, 2026, WBCB changed its format from full service to talk/sports.
