= James Dyson (disambiguation) =

James Dyson (born 1947) is a British inventor, industrial designer and founder of Dyson Ltd..

James Dyson may also refer to:

- James Dyson (schoolmaster) (1875–1956), headmaster of grammar schools at Ripon and Boston, grandfather of the inventor
- James Dyson (physicist) (1914–1990), scientist at the National Physical Laboratory
- James Dyson (footballer) (born 1979), former Birmingham City F.C. football player
- James Dyson (minister) (1950–2020), American minister and teacher.
