= Michael Barkann =

American sportscaster (born 1960)

- Born: April 30, 1960 (age 66); Jersey City, New Jersey, U.S.
- Education: East Brunswick High School S.I. Newhouse School of Public Communication
- Occupation: Sportscaster
- Spouse: Ellen Barkann (2 children)

Michael Barkann (born April 30, 1960) is an American sports host, anchor and reporter for NBC Sports Philadelphia. From 2011 to 2016, he co-hosted the "Mike and Ike" show on 94 WIP weekdays from 10am – 2pm.

== Early years ==
Barkann grew up in East Brunswick, New Jersey and attended East Brunswick High School, where he was an outstanding long-distance runner in spring track & cross country, graduating with the class of 1978.

He is a graduate of Syracuse University, class of 1982. He graduated with a B.S. in Broadcast Journalism from the S.I. Newhouse School of Public Communications.

== Broadcasting career ==
=== Early career ===
Barkann started his career at NBC News in Washington, D.C. as a desk assistant. From there he went to New Jersey Network in Trenton, working at first off-camera. On February 11, 1983, after the region was hit with a big blizzard, the station asked Barkann to contribute to the telecast, filing a weather report. It was his first time on air. Soon after, Barkann hosted a program called Weather Watch, which led to him doing the weather for the news broadcast. Several years later, Barkann started doing backup sports for the network, at age 26.

A few months later, Barkann moved to KYW-TV in Philadelphia as a sports reporter. Barkann spent five years at KYW-TV but did not have his contract renewed, leading him to a job in Boston, where he became sports director at WLVI-TV. However, five years in, Barkann received "an unbelievable opportunity" and returned to Philadelphia, beginning his current role as host/reporter at NBC Sports Philadelphia, in Philadelphia, starting in 1997.

=== Comcast SportsNet Philadelphia / NBC Sports Philadelphia ===
On October 1, 1997, Barkann brought the network on the air as host of Daily News Live. The success of Barkann's Daily News Live sparked many other SportsNet affiliates to establish similar programs.

Throughout his career, Barkann has hosted Eagles Post Game Live, which currently features former Governor of Pennsylvania and former Mayor of Philadelphia Ed Rendell, Hall of Famer (Writer's Honor Roll) Ray Didinger, former Eagle Brian Westbrook and WMMR's Kathy Romano. Barkann also hosted Monday Night Live and a program called Spotlight, which are both now off the air. Barkann also hosts the Postgame Live programs for the Phillies, Flyers and Sixers whenever the team is in or near the playoffs.

==== Notable moments at Comcast SportsNet Philadelphia / NBC Sports Philadelphia ====
Barkann was overcome with emotion when hosting a live postgame show the day Harry Kalas died in Washington. Barkann, through tears, called Kalas a "sound of summer" and the "soundtrack of our lives." Barkann said Kalas was a "great, great man," reported that "the voice is silent tonight." Barkann was also highly praised for his job hosting Kalas' memorial service, held at Citizens Bank Park.

Before going on air for Phillies Postgame Live, Barkann, along with former Phillies all-stars Ricky Bottalico and Darren Daulton, watched Game 4 of the 2009 NLCS from their set. When Jimmy Rollins hit a memorable walk-off double to the gap in right-center, Barkann and crew exploded. In footage captured by an idle studio camera and later released to the public, Bottalico can be seen saying "that's winning the game, that's winning the damn game" and Barkann throwing his hands in the air and yelling "this team is incredible, this team is unbelievable!" The video was used as part of the Phillies pregame montage shown on their video board at Citizens Bank Park during the 2010 postseason.

While working for KYW-TV, Barkann did a piece called "Birds Eye View" during which Coach Buddy Ryan allowed him to "try out" for the team. Barkann lined up at receiver with Randall Cunningham at QB. Troy West, the DB, lined up against Barkann, who Barkann later recalled "threw me ten feet in the air." When asked about Barkann's performance, Mike Quick said, "I thought he was going to be bad, but that was just sad."

=== National broadcasting career ===
Barkann's career has also included many national jobs. Most notably, he served as a field reporter for USA Network's coverage of the U.S. Open Tennis Championships from 1991 to 2008. In 2009, coverage shifted to ESPN and Barkann was left off the broadcast team.

Since leaving the Open, Barkann has covered the Billie Jean King Cup for HBO Sports. Held at Madison Square Garden and shown nationally on HBO, the event featured a final of Serena Williams against her sister Venus.

Barkann's career has also included reporting for CBS. With CBS he has covered major events, including the Olympic Winter Games in Nagano, Japan in 1998, and the Olympic Winter Games in Lillehammer, Norway in 1994 as a speed skating reporter covering Dan Jansen, who won a gold medal in the 1000m.

In 1992, Barkann was a reporter at the 1992 Winter Olympic Games in Albertville, France where he covered the Dan Jansen story. Barkann's career also involved the NCAA he has covered the Final Four and Fiesta Bowl for CBS as well as Big 5 Basketball events and telecasts.

In 2009, Barkann also hosted the finale of Being John Daly for the Golf Channel.

Barkann is also a former XFL commentator. He worked the UPN (now CW) game telecasts.

==== Notable national broadcasting moments ====
During Barkann's time at the Open, fans grew accustomed to his off-beat, fun interview style. One of the first stories Barkann did for USA was on a hot dog stand that players had mentioned smelling during their matches. His piece included an interview with the vendor, who insisted if the players came and tried his hot dogs all would be well.

Another famous moment came back in 1992 with Barbra Streisand, who was then rumored to be dating Andre Agassi. Barkann asked Streisand, "what moves you about him on the court," to which she replied, "he's so evolved, more so than his linear years and he plays like a zen master out there." This interview marked the first time Streisand talked publicly about her relationship with Agassi.

In 2007, Barkann interviewed Jerry Seinfeld and Larry David. Barkann asked the two what the funniest thing they had seen at the Open was, to which Seinfeld replied, "not you."

At the 2008 Open, Barkann asked Novak Djokovic in his on-court post match interview to do his famous, but never-before-seen impersonations. Djokovic did his Maria Sharapova and Rafael Nadal impersonations, becoming an instant sensation on YouTube (getting over one million hits). Ironically, Barkann's last interview at the US Open was another attention-getter with Novak talking in front of a sea of angry booing fans about how they were only cheering for Andy Roddick because they thought he had "16 injuries".

== Personal life ==
Barkann resides with his wife Ellen in Newtown Square, Pennsylvania. Ellen was instrumental in the startup of The Philadelphia Sports Group, which serves as a talent marketing agency for local and national athletes and sports media members. His daughter is Emmy award-winning journalist and White House correspondent, Emily Barkann.

Barkann read the eulogy at former colleague and MLB catcher John Marzano's funeral and frequently recalls the shortened life of his great friend. He also spoke at Daily News columnist Phil Jasner's funeral, along with Doug Collins.

Barkann was the subject of part of Bill Conlin's speech at his induction to the National Baseball Hall of Fame in Cooperstown, New York.

Michael, along with his wife Ellen Barkann, started the Barkann Family Healing Hearts Foundation in the beginning of 2013. The foundation seeks to help heal the hearts of families across the Delaware Valley whose hearts have been broken by the sudden illness or sudden loss of life of a loved one. Many notable events include their yearly Golf Outing in May and their Holiday Hearts program, which donated thousands of dollars to five families during the 2013 Christmas season.

== Awards ==
Barkann has won a number of awards which include:

- Named Pennsylvania's Sportscaster of the Year in 1999, 2001, 2002, 2003, 2004, 2006, and 2007.
- Recipient of 1989 Mid-Atlantic Emmy for Outstanding Individual Achievement Sports Reporter
- Recipient of 1989 Mid-Atlantic Emmy for Outstanding Sports Feature
- Recipient of 1991 Mid-Atlantic Emmy for Outstanding Individual Achievement Sports Reporter
- Recipient of 2003 Mid-Atlantic Emmy for Outstanding Individual Achievement Host/Talk Program
- Recipient of 2006 Mid-Atlantic Emmy for Outstanding Talk Program
- 5-time Philadelphia Sports Emmy Award winner
- 2010 Greater Philadelphia Chapter of ALS annual honoree
