= John Smallwood =

John Smallwood may refer to:

- John Smallwood MP, also known as Jack O'Newbury
- John Smallwood (journalist) – Sportswriter for the Philadelphia Daily News, see Daily News Live (Comcast SportsNet)
