= Drawn By Pain =

- Created by: Jesse Cowell
- Starring: Marissa Parness; Elizabeth Plevy; Guy Rader; Michael Speer; Jack Perry; Sharon Hawk
- Country of origin: United States
- Original language: English
- No. of episodes: 12

Original release
- Network: The Escapist

Drawn By Pain is a 12-part episodic internet series. It is about the spiral into one woman's search for salvation as her animated madness fights for her sanity in the real world.

== Plot/Summary ==
A little girl with an abusive father finds a creative outlet for her inner turmoil in personal drawings to escape the horrible reality of her domestic life. In his last fit of rage, her father kills her mother and then turns his attention to young Emily. The illustrations in her sketch book come to life in her defense. Fueled by her rage, Emily becomes her animated dark alter-ego and strikes out against her father, avenging her mother's unjust death. Consequently, Emily's adulthood is as broken as her childhood. A bitter and sheltered woman, Emily's past demons fuel, empower, and push her to be the very thing she once feared: a monster. Publicly quiet but privately vengeful, her animated beasts degenerate others into their ugliest forms. As soon as they become their worst, she destroys them as if were her personal responsibility.

But with this vengeance comes confusion. At first, Emily controls her animations. As her demons grow stronger, she can no longer stop the little girl inside of her from lashing out at the world. She quickly turns from predator to prey as new demonic beings, forged by her own strife-ridden mind, appear and begin to virulently pursue her. Emily struggles to reconcile her brutal past before the animated power triggered by her anguished inner psyche kills her and everyone around her.

== Characters ==
- Emily Waters – A troubled girl fighting with and against the trauma of her past.
- Douglas – A sociable stranger who befriends Emily over a series of brief encounters. His alcoholic mother used to beat him and his brother, who, when he turned fourteen, stabbed her in defense of himself and Douglas. With his mother dead and his brother in prison, Douglas was sent to live with a new family to start over.
- Morsus – The animated manifestation of Emily's father and the cruelty she associates with him.
- Father – A brute of a man whose own violent upbringing drives him to abuse his wife and daughter.
- Mother – The only example and source of love and devotion in Emily's young life. She gives Emily a minor glimmer of hope before her brutal husband wickedly takes her life in front of her daughter's eyes.
- Steven Coleman – The counselor, whose physical blindness makes him no less insightful, Emily seeks for help.
- Jonas – A wicked drug-dealer whose witness of Emily's powers drives him to hunger for the talent himself.
- Pedro – A less-than-innocent bystander who tries to pick up Emily in the deserted streets of New York. When he threatens her with a knife, she takes him as her first victim.
- Antonio, Jackson, Mikey, Patrick, Tyrell – Troublemakers in the woods who bait Emily into defending one of them in order to surround and attack her. Her wolf animation springs to life to destroy them all.

== Cast and crew ==
- Jesse Cowell – Creator/Director
- Erica Langworthy – Animator/Designer
- Marissa Parness – Adult Emily
- Elizabeth Plevy – Young Emily
- Guy Rader – Douglas
- Michael Speer – Father
- Sharon Hawk – Mother

== Drawn by Pain: The Webseries ==
Episode	Original Air Date	Title
1	March 17, 2007	Emily Waters
2	March 17, 2007	Drawn By Pain
3	March 23, 2007	Not Entirely Alone
4	April 1, 2007	On A Mission
5	May 1, 2007	The Dissent of Emily
6	June 7, 2007	Emily Is Not Crazy
7	July 5, 2007	Only Safe In The Shadows
8	September 21, 2007	Enter At Your Own Risk
9	December 18, 2007	How Do You Fight The Enemy When You Are The Enemy?
10	February 4, 2008	See What You Fear
11	April 11, 2008	Step Into The Storm
12	August 26, 2008	What Goes Around Comes Around

== Acclaim and recognition ==
=== 2007 ===
- Drawn by Pain hits iTunes "What's Hot List." (February, March, and April)
- Toon Boom Animation runs in-depth "case study " on Drawn by Pain and its creators on their website and newsletter. (May)
- The New York Post mentions upcoming Drawn by Pain screening in "The Starr Report" television column. (October 10)
- New York's Courier Publications/24 Seven spotlights Drawn by Pain and Jesse Cowell in a full-page feature story. (October 12)
- Jesse Cowell and animator Erica Langworthy are interviewed live for WOR Radio for a national broadcast. (December 6)
- Independent Film Channel (IFC) airs interview with Jesse Cowell at the New York Anime Festival on their website and YouTube channel. (December 10)

=== 2008 ===
- Drawn by Pain is short listed for Best Use of Animation/Motion Graphics in the 12th Annual Webby Awards. (February 11)
- Drawn by Pain is officially nominated for the 12th Annual Webby Awards in its category. (April 8)
- IFC debuts Cowell's interview/appearance on their new daily online show "Lunchbox," discussing the Drawn by Pain creative process and the Webby nomination. (April 11)
- The New York Post runs an item on Jesse Cowell's IFC Lunchbox appearance and the Webby nomination in Michael Starr's column, "The Starr Report." (April 11)
- MSG New York features Drawn by Pain in a segment. (April 20)
- Drawn by Pain officially wins Webby People's Voice Award.
- Escapist Magazine syndicates Drawn by Pain. (May 19)
- Mediaweek highlights dramatic content with high production value, featuring Drawn by Pain. (July 28)
- Cowell appears on nationally syndicated Fangoria Radio Show with Dee Snider. (September 7)
- The Lean Forward Movement features Drawn by Pain for its stylistic excellence. (December 29)
