= James Dyson (minister) =

American minister and teacher

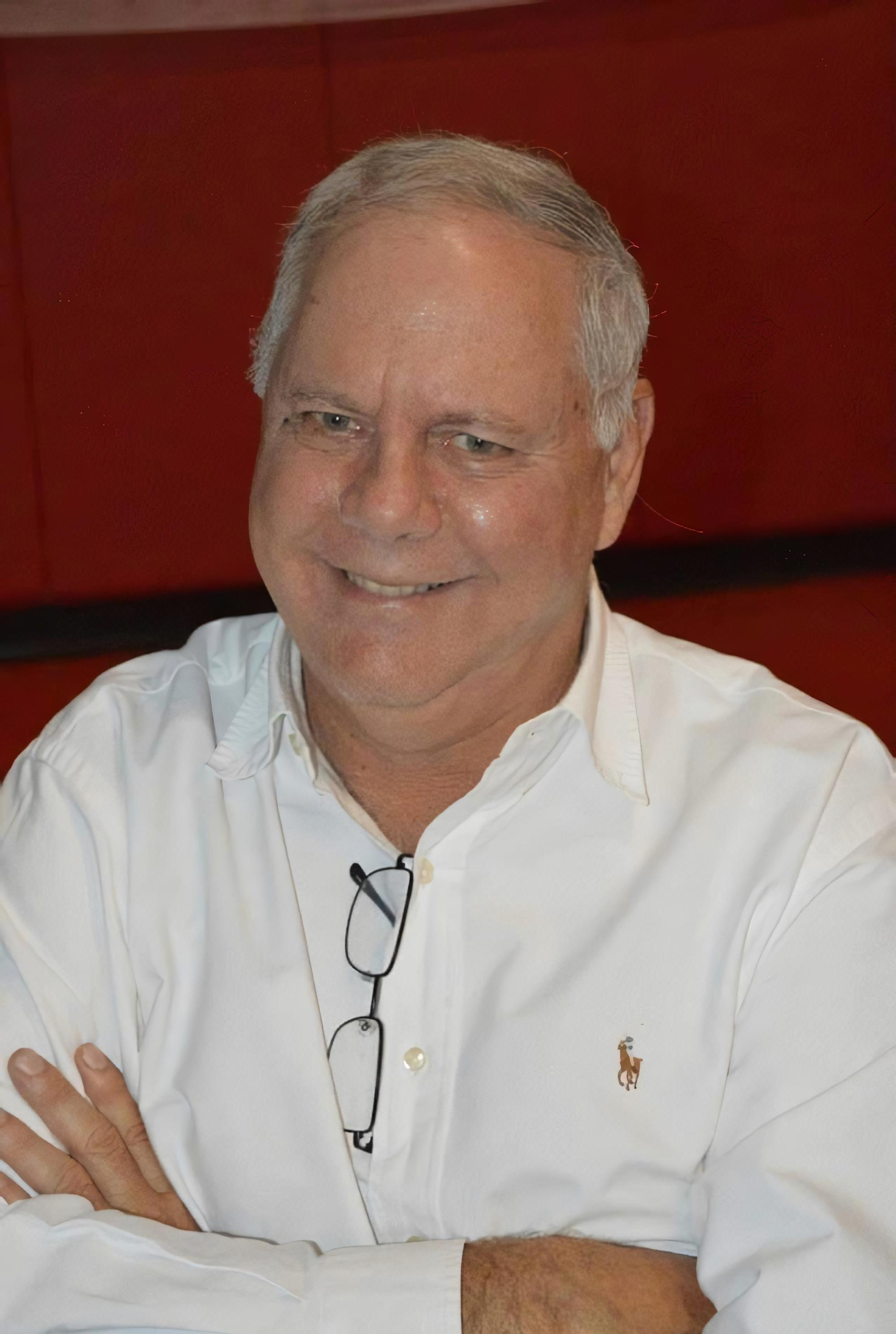
- Born: 17 May 1950; Philadelphia, Pennsylvania, U.S.
- Died: 28 October 2020 (aged 70); Largo, Florida, U.S.
- Education: University of Florida
- Occupations: Teacher, Minister

James Ernest "Jim" Dyson (17 May 1950 – 28 October 2020) was an American minister and teacher serving primarily in the city of Largo, Florida. Throughout his career, he would found and serve as Area Director of Young Life in Ridgecrest, Florida, serve as Vice President of Young Life's Eastern Division, and begin a children's literacy program at Ridgecrest Elementary School.

== Early life ==
Dyson was born and would grow up in Philadelphia, Pennsylvania. On a scholarship for track and field, he moved to Gainesville, Florida, in 1968 to run track for the University of Florida. Dyson's university career during desegregation of the American Civil Rights movement inspired his outreach in minority and low-income communities. He married Amy Simpson Dyson in 1970, with whom he had two children.

== Career ==
Dyson moved to Jacksonville, Florida, in 1972, where he began his work with Young Life. He would later move to Largo, Florida in 1974 outside the low-income community of Ridgecrest, where he established an Urban Young Life in the area to support the local youth. He served in this position at Young Life through the remainder of the 20th century. In 1998, Dyson would be named Vice President of Multicultural and Urban Ministry for the Central Southern Division of Young Life. In 2005, Dyson would be appointed as Vice President of Field Ministry in the Eastern Division. During his time at Young Life, Dyson dedicated himself to understanding African American issues, being praised for his understanding of such by colleague BeBe Hobson. Dyson retired in 2014, and Young Life, in commemoration, established the Jim Dyson Young Life Center in Ridgecrest.

Following Dyson's retirement in 2014, he established the Panther Pals Reading program at Ridgecrest Elementary School. The program would be founded on the principle of improving children's literacy in the Ridgecrest community. In 2017, the program reported 180 students and 80 volunteers participating in the program. That year, the Principal of Ridgecrest Elementary School, Michael Moss, stated that students who participated in the program saw significantly increased reading scores.

From 1980 until his death, Dyson led and taught a Sunday school program at Anona United Methodist Church. With Anona, he would also attend missionaries to their sister church in Cardenas, Cuba, Iglesia Methodist de Cardenas.

== Illness and death ==
In 2018, Dyson was diagnosed with Lou Gehrig's Disease, or ALS. Following the diagnosis, Dyson would continue his ministry until his death.

On August 22, 2020, a Little Free Library was dedicated to Dyson, entitled Mr. Jim's Little Neighborhood Library. The library had the stated purpose of allowing Ridgecrest children access to books during the COVID-19 pandemic. Young Life donated a public bench and a portion of property at the site of the Jim Dyson Young Life Center to install the library.

Dyson would pass away on October 28, 2020, due to complications from Lou Gehrig's disease at age 70.
