= Young Life =

Religious organization based in Colorado Springs, Colorado, US

- Abbreviation: YL
- Formation: October 16, 1941; 85 years ago
- Founder: Jim Rayburn
- Type: Christian Fellowship; Social Club; University Student Society; Outreach
- Headquarters: Colorado Springs, Colorado, United States
- Location: Worldwide
- President/CEO: Newt Crenshaw
- Affiliations: Chicago Agreement: Unity in Mission
- Revenue: US$403 million (2019)
- Volunteers: 46,340 (2021-2022)
- Website: www.younglife.org

1977 promotional film about the Malibu Club.

Young Life is an international Christian youth organization based Colorado Springs, Colorado. Young Life offers week-long Summer camps with the stated goal of evangelizing to teenagers.

The organization was started in Gainesville, Texas in 1941 by Presbyterian minister Jim Rayburn and is currently led by president and CEO Newt Crenshaw. Young Life operates globally using several different organizations with different focuses.

Young Life has had controversies involving anti-LGBTQ+ policies, a Business Insider exposé into sexual misconduct allegations published in 2021, and a criminal investigation into child sexual abuse in 2025.

== History ==
In 1941, Presbyterian seminary student Jim Rayburn started Young Life to evangelize to high school students who showed no interest in Christianity. He began hosting a weekly club which featured one or two skits, as well as a simple message about Jesus.

The Young Life website credits the beginning to Clara Frasher, an elderly woman who around 1933 recruited friends to help her pray for teenagers attending Gainesville High School. In 1939, Rayburn who was a young seminarian, started a chapter of the Miracle Book Club. He also worked with local pastor Clyde Kennedy. In the late 1940s at Wheaton College in Illinois, the organization began using both paid staff and volunteers. Per Young Life's website, they have had partnerships with Fuller Theological Seminary, as well as other seminaries.

== Ministry ==
=== Methods ===
Young Life operates using the "5 C's" of contact work, club, campaigners, camp, and committee. In the 2021-2022 year, an average of 294,761 teens attended weekly club and an average of 127,709 attended weekly campaigners, and was led by 46,340 volunteer leaders.

- Contact work: meeting and befriending teens where they are
- Club: weekly large-group meetings
- Campaigners: weekly small group "bible studies" for teens wanting to grow in their faith
- Camp: overnight weeklong (or weekend) camps at one of Young Life's 26 camps
- Committee: parents and community members who oversee and guide Young Life in local areas

=== Ministry Areas ===
Young Life operates several different ministries with specific focuses:

- Young Life: a ministry for high school-aged students
- Wyldlife: a ministry for middle school-aged students
- Young Life College: a ministry for college-aged students
- YoungLives: a ministry for pregnant and parenting teenagers
- Young Life Capernaum: a ministry for teens with disabilities
- Young Life Multiethnic: a ministry with a special focus on serving teens of color in under-resourced communities
- Young Life Military (Club Beyond): a ministry for teens with parents in the armed services
- Young Life Small Towns/Rural: a ministry focusing on teens in rural areas
- Young Life One: a ministry for teens affected by homelessness, incarceration, human trafficking, or within the foster-care system
- Around the World: Young Life's international ministry
- Catholic Relations: a ministry for developing staff and volunteers to minister to Catholic teens, equipping practicing Catholics to serve, and working alongside Catholic parishes, schools, and universities

== Camps ==
=== Numbers and locations ===
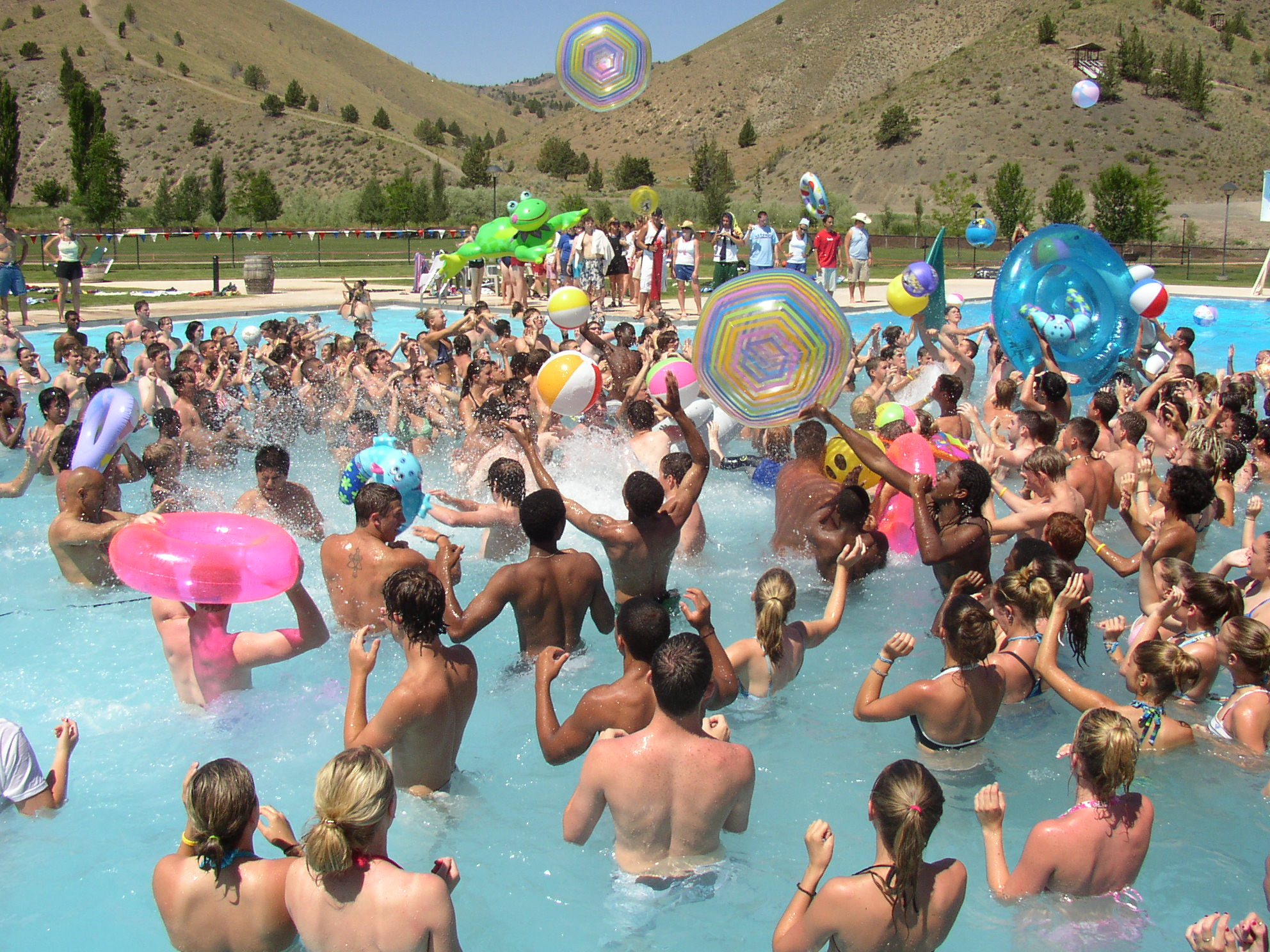
Swimming campers at Young Life's Washington Family Ranch.

Young Life maintains summer camps in 18 American states as well as camps in British Columbia, Canada, the Dominican Republic, Scotland, Armenia, and France. Overall, there are 26 camps, with 6 located outside the United States.

In addition to regular summer camps, Young Life operates 6 "adventure" camps which offer campers and their leaders unique outdoor-based experiences. In "Base Camp Adventures", campers stay in yurts or cabins while participating in daily activities whereas "Trail Adventures" allows for campers to participate in backpacking-based camping. Young Life also operates two "discipleship focus" camps, a ten week long work/study program for college students.

The largest of Young Life camp is the Washington Family Ranch (and accompanying Big Muddy Ranch Airport) in Antelope, Oregon. The ranch was formerly the site of a commune in the Rajneesh movement.

Young Life hosted 215,202 campers in the 2021-2022 camping season.

Camps Owned by Young Life
Name	Location	Type
Adventures Baja	Baja, Mexico	Base Camp Adventure
Adventures Santa Cruz	Santa Cruz, CA	Base Camp Adventure
Adventures Wild Ridge	Mt Nebo, WV	Base Camp Adventure
Beyond Malibu	British Columbia, Canada	Trail Adventures
Cairn Brae	Creiff, Perthshire, Scotland	Camp
Carolina Point	Brevard, NC	Camp
Castaway Club	Detroit Lakes, MN	Camp
Clearwater Cove	Lampe, MO	Camp
Crooked Creek Ranch	Fraser, CO	Camp
Eagles Call	Pigeon Forge, TN	Discipleship Focus
Frontier Ranch	Buena Vista, CO	Camp
La Finca	Matagalpa, Nicaragua	Camp
Lake Champion	Glen Spey, NY	Camp
LoneHollow Ranch	Vanderpool, TX	Camp
Lost Canyon	Williams, AZ	Camp
Malibu Club	British Columbia, Canada	Camp
Notch Pines	Branson, MO	Discipleship Focus
Pico Escondido	Jarabacoa, Dominican Republic	Camp
Pioneer Plunge	Weaverville, NC	Base Camp Adventure
Pioneer	Hankavan, Armenia	Camp
Rockridge Canyon	British Columbia, Canada	Camp
Rockbridge	Goshen, VA	Camp
Saranac Village	Saranac Lake, NY	Camp
Sharptop Cove	Jasper, GA	Camp
Southwind	Ocklawaha, FL	Camp
Timber Wolf Lake	Lake City, MI	Camp
Trail West Lodge	Creede, CO	Camp
Washington Family Ranch	Antelope, OR	Camp
Wild Ridge	Mt Nebo, WV	Camp
Wilderness Ranch	Creede, CO	Trail Adventures
Windy Gap	Weaverville, NC	Camp
Woodleaf	Challenge, CA	Camp

=== Evangelizing aspects ===
According to a 1994 Vancouver Sun newspaper article, out of 350 students attending one particular week-long session at the Malibu Camp in British Columbia, Canada, more than 100 publicly testified during the informal ceremony of "Commitment Night" on the final night saying they had committed their lives to Jesus. One camper said, "You're treated like an adult. There's a lot more freedom here than other Christian camps." Another camper said, "But I'm starting to feel a lot of pressure to become a Christian. I used to just sit there and agree with them, just to get them off my back. But now I'm ticked."

== Promotion ==
In 2025, Young Life partnered with Joe Gibbs Racing to replace He Gets Us as sponsor the No. 19 Toyota Supra driven by Aric Almirola in 17 NASCAR Xfinity Series races. Both JGR co-founder JD Gibbs and team president Dave Alpern were involved with Young Life. Young Life would return the following year with Brent Crews in what's now the NASCAR O'Reilly Auto Parts Series.

== Controversies ==
=== Statement of Non-negotiables ===
In November 2007, Jeff McSwain, the Area Director of Durham and Chapel Hill, along with others, publicly took issue with the organization's presentation of the concept of sin. McSwain's theology emphasizes that “God has a covenant, marriage-like relationship with the world he has created, not a contract relationship that demands obedience prior to acceptance.” McSwain also took issue with Young Life's 2007 “statement of non-negotiables”. He was not satisfied with the wording of the theological principles and felt that they sounded “more Unitarian than Trinitarian by drawing a sharp contrast between the holy God and incarnated Son who ‘actually became sin.’”

Tony Jones felt that Young Life's Statement of “non-negotiables” encouraged telling staffers that “they must not introduce the concept of Jesus and his grace until the students have been sufficiently convinced of their own depravity and been allowed to stew in that depravity (preferably overnight).”. This interpretation is not widely held by YL staff. Eight members of Young Life's staff based in Durham, North Carolina resigned their positions after these “non-negotiables” were announced.

=== LGBTQ+ policy ===
Young Life (USA and Canada) allows LGBTQ students to participate in Young Life activities, but does not allow them to volunteer or take leadership roles. In the organization's forms, homosexuality is described as a “lifestyle” which is “clearly not in accord with God's creation purposes.” Conner Mertens, the first active college football player to come out as LGBTQ, was active in the group as a teenager, and planned to work with the group in college, but was not allowed due to his sexuality.

Young Life's policy also extends to LGBTQ allies. Local leader Pam Elliott stepped down after being asked to remove a photo from her Facebook page showing her support for the LGBTQ community.

In 2020, a social media campaign titled #dobetteryounglife was created to share stories by former Young Life members who were discriminated against because of their sexual orientation.

=== 2021 EEOC investigation ===
As of 2021, Young Life was under investigation by the Equal Employment Opportunity Commission for allegedly failing to protect its employees against sexual misconduct and racial discrimination. One alleged victim of sexual abuse reported that she informed more than a dozen people about the harassment she faced, being told at one point that it was "God's plan" for her. Her case was dismissed after she received a settlement from Young Life.

A 2021 Business Insider investigation detailed allegations from nine former Young Life members across the United States who said they experienced sexual misconduct by leaders and described what they viewed as systemic failures in the organization’s reporting and accountability processes.

=== Child Sexual Abuse Investigation ===
In 2025, multiple young people in Carroll County, Maryland, came forward with allegations of sexual abuse involving a former Young Life leader, Justin Rieger, prompting a criminal investigation by local law enforcement. The Sheriff's office found child sexual abuse material on Rieger's phone but the investigation was concluded after the suicide of Rieger.

== Notable people ==
- J.D. Gibbs – former president of Joe Gibbs Racing of NASCAR; volunteer leader throughout college and adulthood, longtime committee chairman for Young Life in Lake Norman.
- Clint Gresham - former NFL long snapper. Volunteer leader in Seattle, Washington.
- Bill Haslam - former Governor of Tennessee; board member.
- Brandon Heath – a contemporary Christian musician; attended Malibu Club as a high school student, became a leader in college and is still involved today.
- Drew Holcomb and Ellie Holcomb – Americana and folk rock musicians; member of local committee in Nashville, Tennessee, summer camp musicians.
- Marcus Johnson – American football wide receiver. Volunteer Young Life leader. Wore Young Life cleats for the NFL's cleats for a cause campaign.
- Conner Mertens – first openly LGBT active college football player. Prohibited from volunteering by organization's policies.
- Jordy Nelson – former NFL wide receiver; major donor for the organization's ministry in Green Bay, Wisconsin.
- Stevie Nicks – American singer and songwriter with Fleetwood Mac, who went to Young Life meetings just to get out of the house.
- Chase Rice – country music singer, reality television personality and college football player.
- Aaron Rodgers – NFL quarterback for the Pittsburgh Steelers; attended WoodLeaf Towne as a high school student, volunteered for the ministry in college.
- Richard Russel - A Horizon Air ground agent who stole an Alaska Airlines Dash 8 airliner and crashed on Ketron Island in the Puget Sound, south of Seattle.
- James Dyson – Minister and teacher from Largo, Florida. Was Area Director of Ridgecrest, Florida Young Life, and Vice President of Young Life's Eastern Division.
