= Daily News Live =

Daily News Live may refer to:

- Daily News Live (Comcast SportsNet), sports talk show on Comcast SportsNet Philadelphia
- Daily News Live (SportsNet New York), sports talk show on SportsNet New York
- Daily News Live (Zimbabwe), a 24-hour news channel in Zimbabwe; see Daily News (Harare)
