= Bill Conlin =

American sportswriter (1934 – 2014)

- Born: May 15, 1934; Philadelphia, Pennsylvania, U.S.
- Died: January 9, 2014 (aged 79); Largo, Florida, U.S.
- Education: Temple University
- Occupation: Sportswriter
- Employers: Philadelphia Bulletin (1960–1965); Philadelphia Daily News (1965–2011)
- Spouse: Irma S. Conlin (m. 1960; died 2009)
- Writing career
- Years active: 1960–2011
- Subjects: Baseball

William T. Conlin Jr. (May 15, 1934 – January 9, 2014) was an American sportswriter. He was a columnist for the Philadelphia Daily News for 46 years. Prior to that, Conlin worked at the Philadelphia Bulletin. He was a member of the Baseball Writers' Association of America. Conlin received the J. G. Taylor Spink Award in 2011. However, he resigned from the Daily News and ended his career later that year, when seven people accused him of sexually abusing them as children.

== Biography ==
Conlin was born in Philadelphia, Pennsylvania, and raised in Brooklyn, New York City. While in school, he was a champion swimmer. He attended Peekskill Military Academy on an athletic scholarship, worked as a lifeguard in the 1950s. He was inducted into the Ocean Rowing Hall of Fame in 1983.

Conlin was a 1961 graduate of Temple University, where he was an editor-in-chief for The Temple University News. Before being hired by the Philadelphia Evening Bulletin in June 1960, he received the Sword Award for service to Temple University. After five years at the Evening Bulletin, he joined the Philadelphia Daily News in 1965. He appeared on more than 300 editions of ESPN's The Sports Reporters, a Sunday morning show of debate among American newspaper columnists. In 2009, he was inducted into the Philadelphia Sports Hall of Fame.

Conlin died on January 9, 2014, in the Largo Medical Center in Largo, Florida. He had been admitted with multiple illnesses, including chronic obstructive pulmonary disease, diabetes, and a colon infection.

== Sportswriting ==
Conlin's sportswriting has been praised for its wit and intelligence. Fellow columnist Mitch Albom wrote, "For years, sitting next to him on The Sports Reporters all I got from Bill Conlin was the spit of his opinions in my ear. His writing is far less messy. It's also brash, charming, intelligent, historical, and at times almost elegant."

However, Conlin drew criticism for failing to include pitcher Nolan Ryan on his Hall of Fame ballot. In November 2007, he caused controversy after quipping in an email that "the only positive thing I can think of about Hitler's time on earth: I'm sure he would have eliminated all bloggers."

== Allegations of child molestation ==
On December 20, 2011, Conlin resigned from his sportswriting position just hours prior to the publication of allegations of child molestation from four people. One of Conlin's accusers was his niece, Kelley Blanchet, a prosecutor in Atlantic City, New Jersey. The claims of abuse were first reported to the police in 2009 when Blanchet said she became concerned for the safety of Conlin's other young relatives. Three more people later claimed they had been abused by Conlin.

The Baseball Writers Association secretary/treasurer Jack O'Connell issued a "member in good standing" statement on December 20. It said in part, "The allegations have no bearing on [Conlin's] winning the 2011 J.G. Taylor Spink Award, which was in recognition of his notable career as a baseball writer".

The day before the story broke, Deadspin editor A.J. Daulerio reported he had an email conversation with Conlin in which Conlin talked about suicide and criticized his accusers and Inquirer reporter Nancy Phillips. According to Daulerio, Conlin's attorney, George Bochetto, called Daulerio in the afternoon and requested him not to post the story, and said Conlin denied emailing Daulerio. The story was posted, and about three hours later, the Inquirer posted its story.

== Bibliography ==
- The Rutledge Book of Baseball (1981), ISBN 0-8317-7596-3
- Batting Cleanup, Bill Conlin, a collection of Conlin's sportswriting, edited by Kevin Kerrane, foreword by Dick Schaap. Temple University Press (1997), ISBN 1-56639-541-0 (Baseball in America series, edited by Rich Westcott)
