= Monday Night Live =

- Genre: Sports talk
- Country of origin: United States

Production
- Production location: Philadelphia, Pennsylvania
- Running time: 60 minutes

Original release
- Network: CSN Philadelphia
- Release: September 11, 2006

Monday Night Live is an American sports-oriented television talk show that aired Mondays 7:00 PM to 8:00 PM ET on Comcast SportsNet Philadelphia live from Chickie's and Pete's Cafe in South Philly. The show was hosted by Michael Barkann, who was joined by Hugh Douglas and Ike Reese for a variety of sports-related entertainment and talk. Kathy Romano joined the show in 2008. Live musical entertainment was provided by house band The Quake.

== Hosts ==
- Michael Barkann
- Hugh Douglas
- Ike Reese
