= Veritas Academy (Florida) =

High school in Florida, United States

Coordinates: 27.8830°N 82.8129°W

Information
- Established: 2005; 21 years ago
- Website: veritasflorida.com

Veritas Academy is the first "University-Model school" opened in Florida. Founded in 2005 by Rick Hermanns and Kira Brown Wilson under the name Veritas Preparatory Academy, it began in Pinellas Park, Florida with 91 students. Serving students K-12th grade, Veritas moved to the campus of Indian Rocks Christian School (IRCS) in the fall of 2008 when it became Veritas Academy in Largo, Florida. As a ministry of First Baptist Church of Indian Rocks, Veritas students joined IRCS for athletics and fine art classes.

Veritas Academy is no longer operating as a school within First Baptist Indian Rocks or Indian Rocks Christian School.

As of 2025, the school was partnering with churches for classroom space on days when the students learn in-person.

== Philosophy ==
Veritas is run on the philosophy of the National Association of University-Model Schools (NAUMS), and focuses on parents being involved in their child's education. It seeks to accomplish this objective by having students K-6th grade receive classroom instruction at a central location two days a week and completing assignments directed by the teacher at home on the other days. Middle school students attended classes three days a week and complete assignments on the off days. High school students followed a collegiate schedule of classes, two, three or five days a week.
