= Largo Central Park =

Public park in Florida

- Location within Florida Location within the United States
- Type: Urban park
- Location: Largo, Florida
- Coordinates: 27.9153°N 82.7852°W
- Area: 70 acres (28 ha)
- Opened: April 1995
- Operator: City of Largo
- Status: Open

Largo Central Park is a 70-acre public park located at 101 Central Park Drive in Largo, Florida, United States. Opened in April 1995, the park features a playground, picnic pavilions, a miniature railroad, a performing arts center, and the James S. Miles and Richard A. Leandri Military Court of Honor. Largo Central Park is situated across the street from the Largo Public Library, and west of the Largo Central Park Nature Preserve, a 31-acre nature park.

A clock tower initially stood at the entrance to the park on the corner of Seminole Boulevard and East Bay Drive, but it was removed in 2009.

Each December, Largo Central Park is decorated with Christmas lights and displays; in 2018, over 2 million lights decorated the park.
