= Largo Public Library =

Public library in Pinellas County, Florida

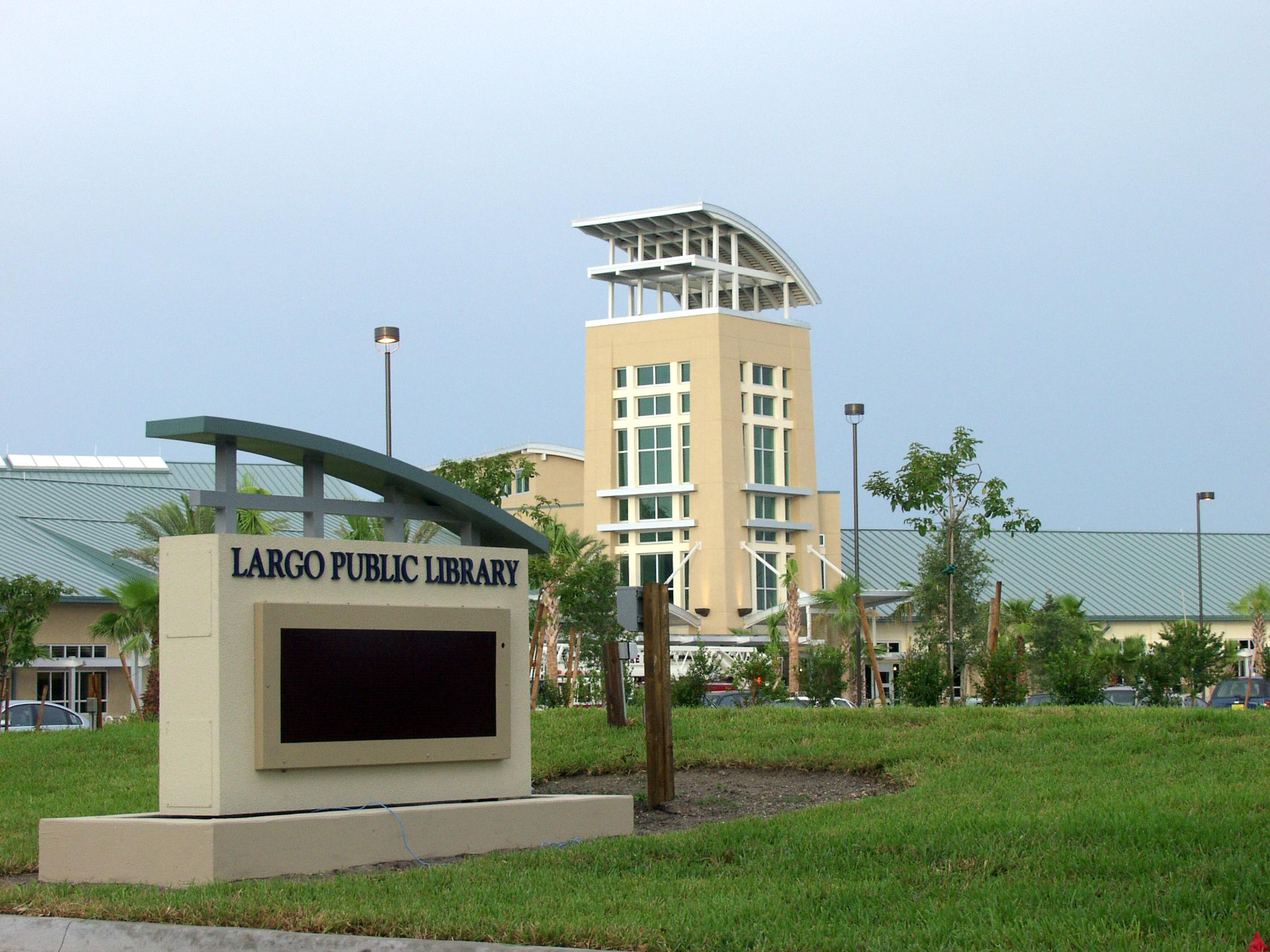
- The current Largo Public Library, opened in 2005
- 27°54′49″N 82°46′59″W
- Location: 120 Central Park Drive; Largo, Florida

Other information
- Director: Casey McPhee
- Website: largopubliclibrary.org

The Largo Public Library is a public library located in Largo, Florida, United States. Located next to Largo Central Park, it serves a community of over 75,000 residents.

The first incarnation of the Largo Public Library opened in 1916, as part of the Largo Town Hall building. An updated and expanded town hall and library facility was completed in 1968. In 1977, a new $1 million facility opened on five acres of land that previously housed a branch office of the Florida Department of Health and Rehabilitative Services. This facility received an expansion in 1989. The current facility, which was funded by a sales tax initiative and utilizes over twice the space as the previous facility, opened to the public on July 31, 2005.

== History ==
=== Origins of the library ===
In 1914, the Woman's Club of Largo began to create a small library for the community of 350 residents. This original Library Committee consisted of Mrs. D.F. Judkins, Mrs. W.F. Belcher, Mrs. J.T. Jackson, Mrs. W.M. Ulmer, and Mrs. Ann McMullen. Efforts to begin the library started at the large Camphor Tree located at the center of downtown where residents left donations. Serving as a "Christmas Giving Tree", residents left books, magazines, wood and other furnishings to help establish the first library of Largo. These donations were placed in the first library facility located in a downstairs room of the original, wood frame Town Hall building with a total of 560 books which officially opened to the community on April 7, 1916. Marie Allen, was paid $2 weekly to serve as Largo's first librarian. Jennie Danforth Judkins, a strong Largo Library advocate, served as the library's second librarian. Such was her dedication to the library that a local legend developed that Mrs. Judkins read every book that was added to the library's collection before it was placed on the shelf.

Due to the bustling population growth of the 1950s, Largo determined the need for a new library facility and town hall and began the project in 1960. December 15, 1961, the groundbreaking took place for the $36,000 new library and Ms. Helene Tilly served as the head librarian upon opening of the facility. By 1968, the current facility on West Bay Drive expanded and contained around 14,000 books. However, the city thereafter determined the need for a new, larger facility and in 1974 local businessman John Jenkins donated five acres of land for the new library. On May 15, 1977, the new $1 million library opened under the direction of Barbara Murphey with 30,000 books present. In 1989 the facility expanded in size and totaled 250,000 volumes, serving an average of 1,500 visitors daily.

=== The modern library ===
In the middle of the 1990s concerns arose on how to deal with the issue of an awkward parking lot entrance, but quickly morphed into the suggestion of a new library facility. After collecting funding from sales-tax through the "Penny for Pinellas" tax initiative, the new facility opened on July 31, 2005. Also to help clearly define the overall goal of the institution within the community the official name of the facility was changed to Largo Public Library. The 90,300 square foot library opened under the direction of Casey McPhee and more than doubled the size of the previous facility. Within the first year of opening the library hired 72 staff, had 200 volunteers, welcomed more than 558,000 visitors, circulated 683,000 items, had 28,000 workshop attendees, and answered 85,000 reference questions.

Largo Public Library has a long history of "firsts" in technology; it was the first library in Pinellas County to use barcodes (1994) and then radio-frequency identification (RFID) technology to check patron materials in and out. When the current library opened in 2005, patrons were able use RFID technology at four self check-out stations located on the first floor. This option is crucial to serving the huge influx of visitors that the library continues to assist each year.

Starting in January 2008, library patrons had the added convenience of a full service drive-through window for returning materials, picking up hold requests and other library related transactions. The Drive-Through enables the library to serve a diverse group including the elderly, parents of young children and the mobility challenged.

In 2013 the library upgraded its RFID system to comply with current standards and also added an automatic materials handler, which checks in and sorts materials. These additions have enabled Largo Public Library staff to re-focus on customer service and programming for their community, despite budget cuts that reduced staffing levels during the recession. This shift in focus was rewarded in 2018 when Largo Public Library was named The Florida Library Association Library of the Year.

== Collection and services ==
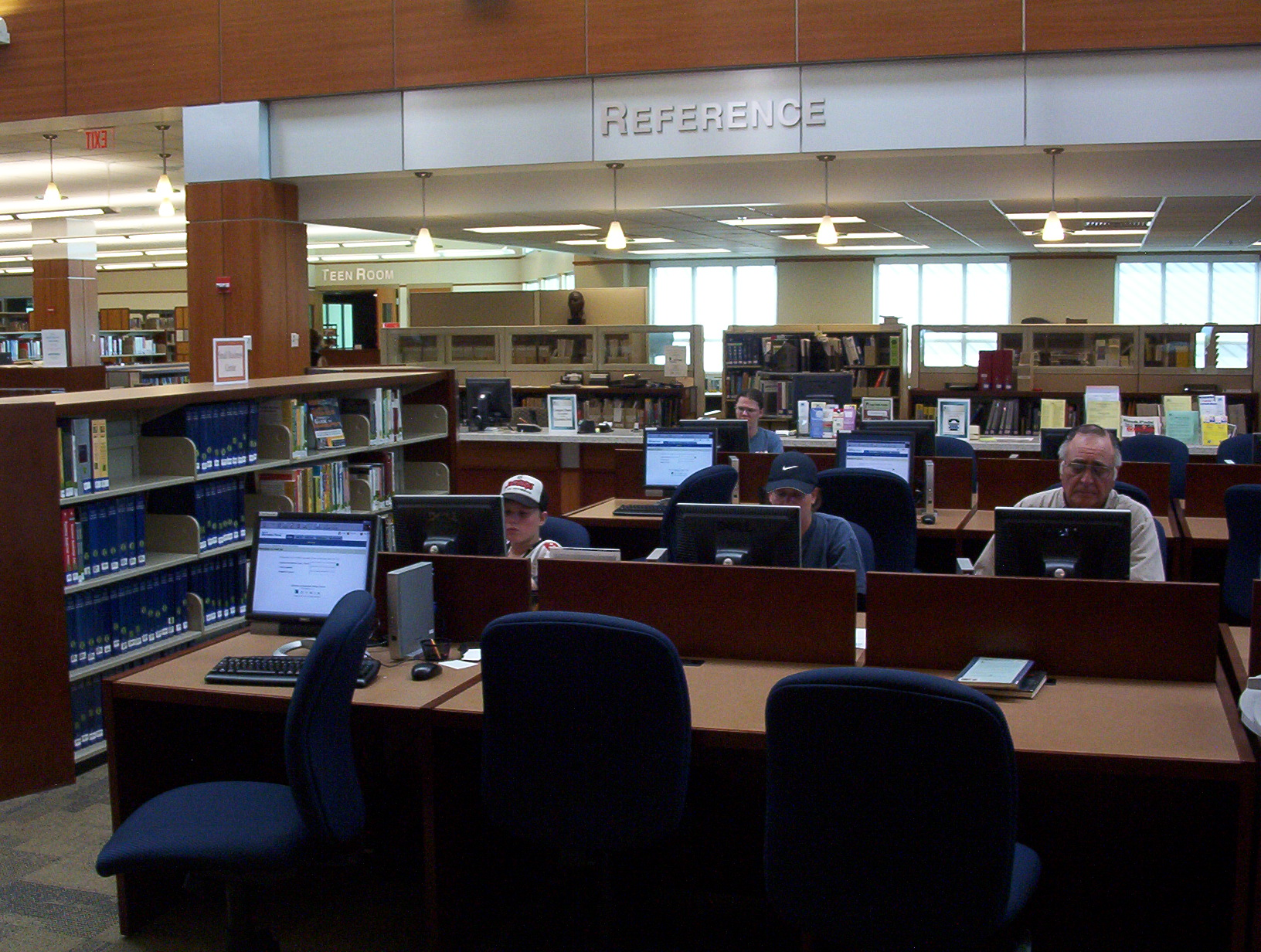
Public computers used for reference services

The Largo Public Library offers a diverse collection of materials available for checkout including DVDs, CDs, books, audiobooks, e-books, and videos. Through collaboration with the Pinellas Public Library Cooperative, the library offers a variety of digital content for check out from an e-reader or computer device through OverDrive's Libby platform.

The physical library has computers for use, as well as study rooms, reference services, Children's Wing and the Teen Room. An ideaLAB with a 3D printer has been added outside the Teen Room as a place to develop creative ideas and explore new technology. The ideaLAB has not only a 3D printer, but also iPads, MacBook Pro laptops, Lego Mindstorms EV3, and a variety of Mac software and iPad apps. All of these services are free to use at the Largo Public Library. They also host gaming, entertainment, literary events and programs for adults, teens and children.

Specialized collections and resource centers are also available for patron use in the form of the English Language Learning Center, e-Government resources and Genealogy collection. The library offers services beyond the physical library through the library's eBranch link. This link is the gateway to a wide variety of e-content including books, music, magazines, streaming video and databases.

Largo Public Library is designated as the center for genealogical research for the Pinellas Public Library Cooperative and partners with the Pinellas Genealogy Society (PGS) to provide a permanent home for maps, magazines, journals, CD-ROMs, microfiche, microfilm, U.S. Census records, numerous Pinellas County cemetery records and obituaries and over 10,000 genealogy related books. In addition patrons have access through the library catalog to many genealogical research databases. Members of PGS also provide one-on-one instruction, research help and a variety of classes and seminars to assist patrons with their genealogical research.

In January 2019 the library launched the Largo Public Library Bookmobile Service. The bookmobile can carry approximately 2,500 items, latest DVD releases, audiobooks, and current bestsellers. In summer 2020 during the height of the COVID-19 pandemic the Library put a halt to its route of stop locations and instead transitioned to a pilot program of home delivery of library materials.
