= Daily News Live (Comcast SportsNet) =

- Genre: Sports, Talk
- Presented by: AT&T
- Country of origin: United States
- Original language: English
- No. of seasons: 16

Production
- Executive producer: Brad Nau
- Producer: Dan Roche
- Production location: CSN Wells Fargo Center studios in Philadelphia
- Editor: James Convey
- Camera setup: 3 cameras, including one crane
- Running time: 60 minutes

Original release
- Network: CSN Philadelphia
- Release: October 1, 1997 – April 4, 2013

Related
- Chicago Tribune Live; Comcast SportsNet Insider; Daily News Live; Washington Post Live

Daily News Live was a live, sports-oriented, talk show that aired from 1997 to 2013 on Comcast SportsNet Philadelphia (now NBC Sports Philadelphia). The show, which was broadcast weeknights from 5:00 to 6:00PM ET, featured host Michael Barkann who was joined by a rotating panel of writers from the Philadelphia Daily News along with athletes and sports experts from around the country for a roundtable discussion about the top sports stories from both the city and the nation.

On game days, guest interviewers would also participate to discuss the night's big game. Viewers were invited to e-mail the show and suggest questions or topics to be discussed on air. Originally, viewers could call in, but that portion of the program was cut by producers.

The show debuted on October 1, 1997, with Michael Barkann, Bill Conlin, Les Bowen, and Jack L. Williams, chairman of Comcast SportsNet.

The success of Daily News Live resulted in the development of similar shows in other Comcast SportsNet sister stations. These include Chicago Tribune Live on Comcast SportsNet Chicago, Chronicle Live on CSN Bay Area, Daily News Live on SportsNet New York, and Washington Post Live on Comcast SportsNet Mid-Atlantic.

Daily News Live aired for the final time on April 4, 2013, following almost 16 years. The program was replaced with Philly Sports Talk the following Monday (April 8).

== Set ==
The original set was simplistic in nature with the panel sitting around a small coffee table. The current set includes a long table that the panel sit at, including many large plasma TVs, displaying topics and videos centered around the discussion. On December 23, 2010, the show was temporarily moved to a different studio while the DNL set was gutted. The show returned to its regular studio on January 10, 2011, when a new set was debuted.

On the night of a big game, the show will air live on remote from the spot of the night's event. For the Flyers, the show will air from the AT&T Pavilion located inside the Wells Fargo Center, for Phillies the show airs from the Diamond Club at Citizens Bank Park, for Sixers the show airs courtside, on the baseline of the Wells Fargo Center floor and on the rare occasion that the Eagles play a weeknight game, DNL will often air from a platform in the parking lot or from the Headhouse Plaza inside Lincoln Financial Field.

== Controversy ==
In June 2008, Bill Conlin, a newly inducted Baseball Hall of Fame sportswriter, attracted criticism for making comments with racial implications during a broadcast. This occurred when an email regarding a question posed to coach Andy Reid about Donovan McNabb's shoulder injury was read aloud on the show. Conlin's remark, "surprising that guy would leave the blueberry harvest to send that off," drew attention and raised concerns. The show's host, Michael Barkann, initially laughed in response but later stated, "don't insult the blueberry harvest, mister."

Stephanie Smith, then president of SportsNet, suspended Conlin and Barkann for further review, and both were absent from the following day's broadcast. Conlin claimed there were no racial connotations associated with his comment in a statement read by fill-in host Neil Hartman. Smith has since been reassigned, and Conlin has not returned to the show, although Barkann has expressed that he is welcome anytime.

Another incident occurred on November 18, 2005, involving Marcus Hayes, a controversial DN columnist, and Barkann, during which Hayes hounded NFL Films producer Greg Cossell. [Barkann] intervened, accusing Hayes of being a know-it-all and questioning his desire to control the show. This led to Barkann stating that they were not debating political matters and expressing his frustration with the lack of enjoyment on the show. Although Hayes and Barkann experienced tensions, they have since appeared together on the show without displaying any publicly expressed animosity.

== Christmas Eve episode ==
DNL is famous for its annual Christmas Eve episode, hosted by Neil Hartman featuring highly controversial, but beloved former Temple Men's Basketball coach John Chaney, and Daily News columnists Dick Jerardi and Mike Kern.

== Awards ==
- 2002 Mid-Atlantic Emmy Nominee, Outstanding Talk Program/Series
- 2003 Mid-Atlantic Emmy Nominee, Outstanding Talk Program/Series
- 2004 Mid-Atlantic Emmy Nominee, OUTSTANDING TALK PROGRAM/SERIES
- 2006 Mid-Atlantic Emmy Recipient, Interview/Discussion – Series
