= HCA Florida Largo Hospital =

Coordinates: 27.914°N 82.803°W

- HCA Healthcare

Geography
- Location: 201 14th St, Largo, Florida, United States

Organization
- Care system: Private hospital
- Funding: For-profit hospital
- Type: General hospital/Teaching hospital

Services
- Emergency department: Yes
- Beds: 455

History
- Former name: Largo Medical Center
- Opened: 1978

Links
- Website: www.hcafloridahealthcare.com/locations/largo-hospital
- Lists: Hospitals in Florida

HCA Florida Largo Hospital, formerly Largo Medical Center, is a 455-bed teaching hospital located in Largo, in the US state of Florida. The hospital has three campuses in Largo and in Clearwater, employs approximately 1,700 people, and is owned by Hospital Corporation of America, a Nashville, Tennessee-based company. As a teaching facility, HCA Florida Largo Hospital operates a number of residency programs. The hospital is accredited by the Joint Commission.
