= Largo, Florida =

- City
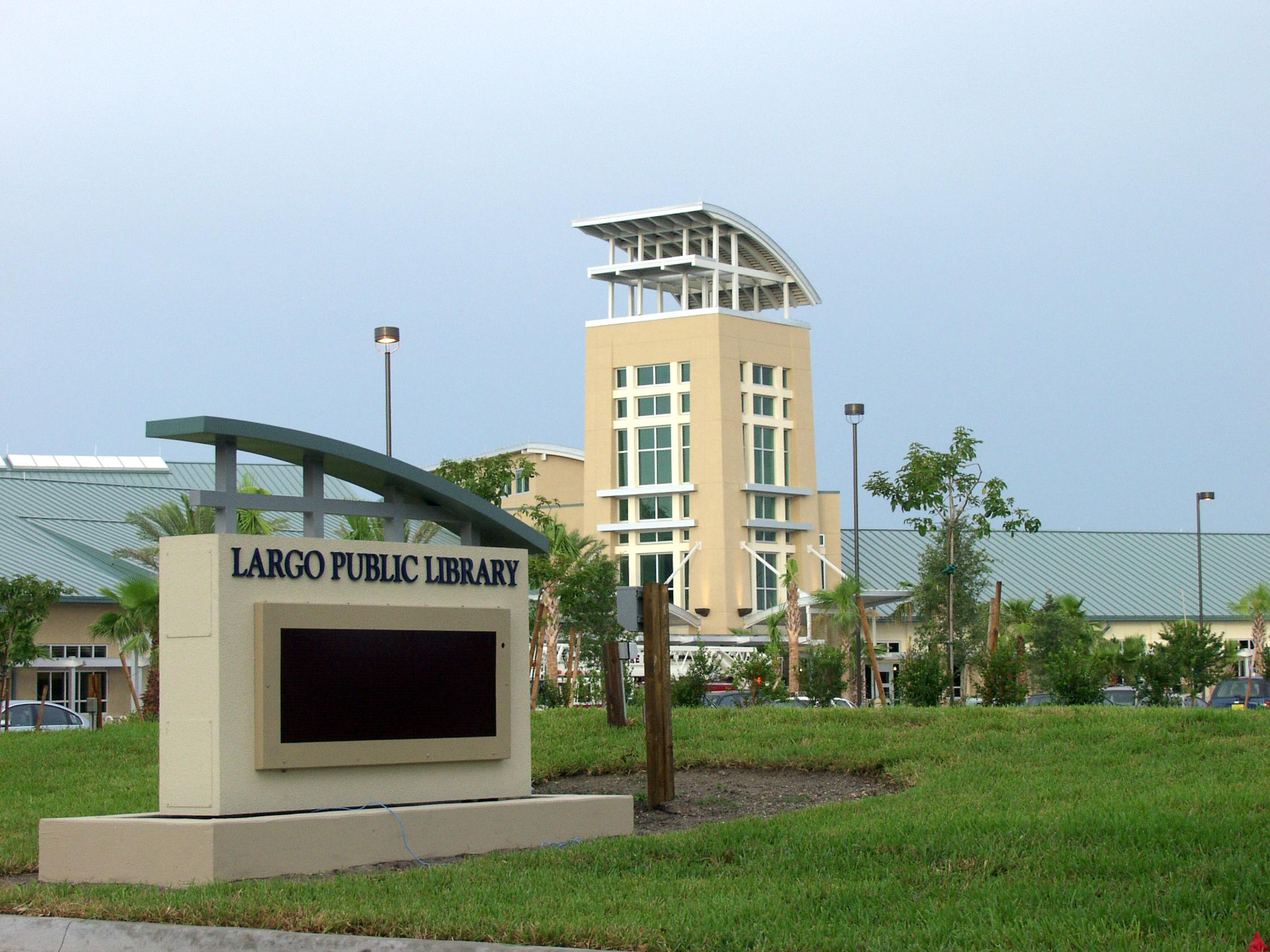
- Largo Public Library

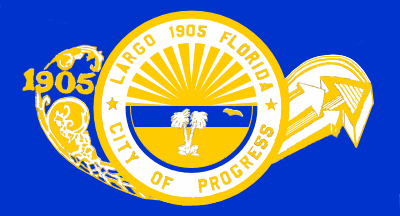
- Flag Seal Logo
- Nickname: The City of Progress
- Location in Pinellas County and the state of Florida
- Coordinates: 27°54′35″N 82°45′04″W
- Country: United States
- State: Florida
- County: Pinellas
- Incorporated: June 6, 1905

Government
  - Type: Commission–manager

Area
  - Total: 19.59 sq mi (50.73 km^{2})
  - Land: 18.60 sq mi (48.17 km^{2})
  - Water: 0.99 sq mi (2.56 km^{2})
- Elevation: 3 ft (0.91 m)

Population (2020)
  - Total: 82,485
  - Density: 4,435.4/sq mi (1,712.52/km^{2})
- Demonym: Largoan
- Time zone: UTC-5 (EST)
  - Summer (DST): UTC-4 (EDT)
- ZIP Codes: 33770–33774 & 33776-33779
- Area code: 727
- FIPS code: 12-39425
- GNIS feature ID: 2404885
- Website: www.largo.com

Largo is the third largest city in Pinellas County, Florida, United States, and the fourth largest in the Tampa Bay area. As of the 2020 census, the city had a population of 82,485, up from 77,648 in 2010.

Largo was first incorporated in 1905. In 1913, it became the first municipality in Pinellas County to adopt a council-manager government. It switched back and forth between "town" and "city" a few times, and became a city again in 1974. It was an agricultural exporter until the 1960s, when population growth began to transform it into a bedroom community. Largo began as a rural farming community and became the third-largest city in Florida's most densely populated county.

== History ==
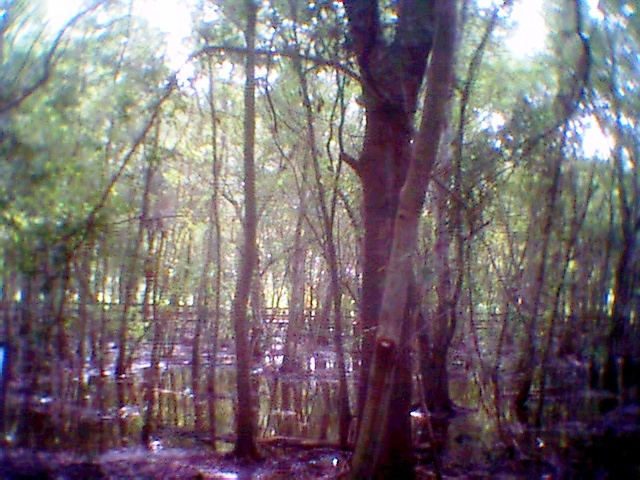
Largo Central Park Nature Preserve

=== Beginnings of the area ===
The native inhabitants of the Largo area were the Tocobaga Indians. They are also known as the Safety Harbor culture, named after their archeological remains near present-day Safety Harbor. The Spanish came to Florida in the 16th century. In the 18th century, the Tocobaga had been virtually destroyed after years of exposure to European diseases, Spanish settlement efforts, and warfare between Spain and England. The Largo area, like the rest of Pinellas County, was largely deserted. In 1763, Spain transferred sovereignty of Florida to the United Kingdom. In 1783, Florida fell under Spanish sovereignty once again, and it was transferred to the United States in 1821. By 1845, a surveyor recorded the location of Lake Tolulu, apparently south of present-day East Bay Drive and roughly where the Largo Central Park Nature Preserve is today.

Later homesteaders to the Largo area included the families of James and Daniel McMullen, around 1852. The McMullens and other settlers raised cattle, grew citrus and vegetables, and fished. During the Civil War, many Largo area residents fought for the Confederate States of America. James and Daniel McMullen were members of the "Cow Cavalry", driving Florida cattle to Georgia and the Carolinas to help sustain the war effort. Other area residents served aboard blockade runners. Still others left the area to serve in the Confederacy's armies. After the war, Largo area residents returned to farming, ranching, and raising citrus. The Orange Belt Railway reached the area in 1888. By this time, Lake Tolulu had been renamed Lake Largo, and residents of the community west of the lake adopted the name "Largo".

=== Incorporation to Great Depression ===
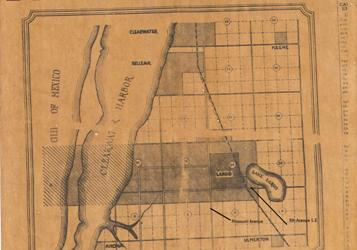
1925 map of Largo

The Town of Largo was incorporated in 1905. Lake Largo was drained in 1916 to make way for growth and development. Between 1910 and 1930, Largo's population increased by about 500%. Then and for decades afterward, Largo's economy was based on agriculture—citrus groves, cattle ranches, and hog farms, as well as turpentine stills and sawmills. Largo is best remembered as "Citrus City", from the time it was a citrus packing, canning, and shipping center.

The Great Depression was difficult for Largo, which lacked the financial resources to meet its obligations. Largo reverted to its 1913 boundaries and charter, after which the population dropped by approximately 30%. The debt incurred from the issuance of bonds in the late 1920s was not paid off until after World War II.

=== Rapid growth ===
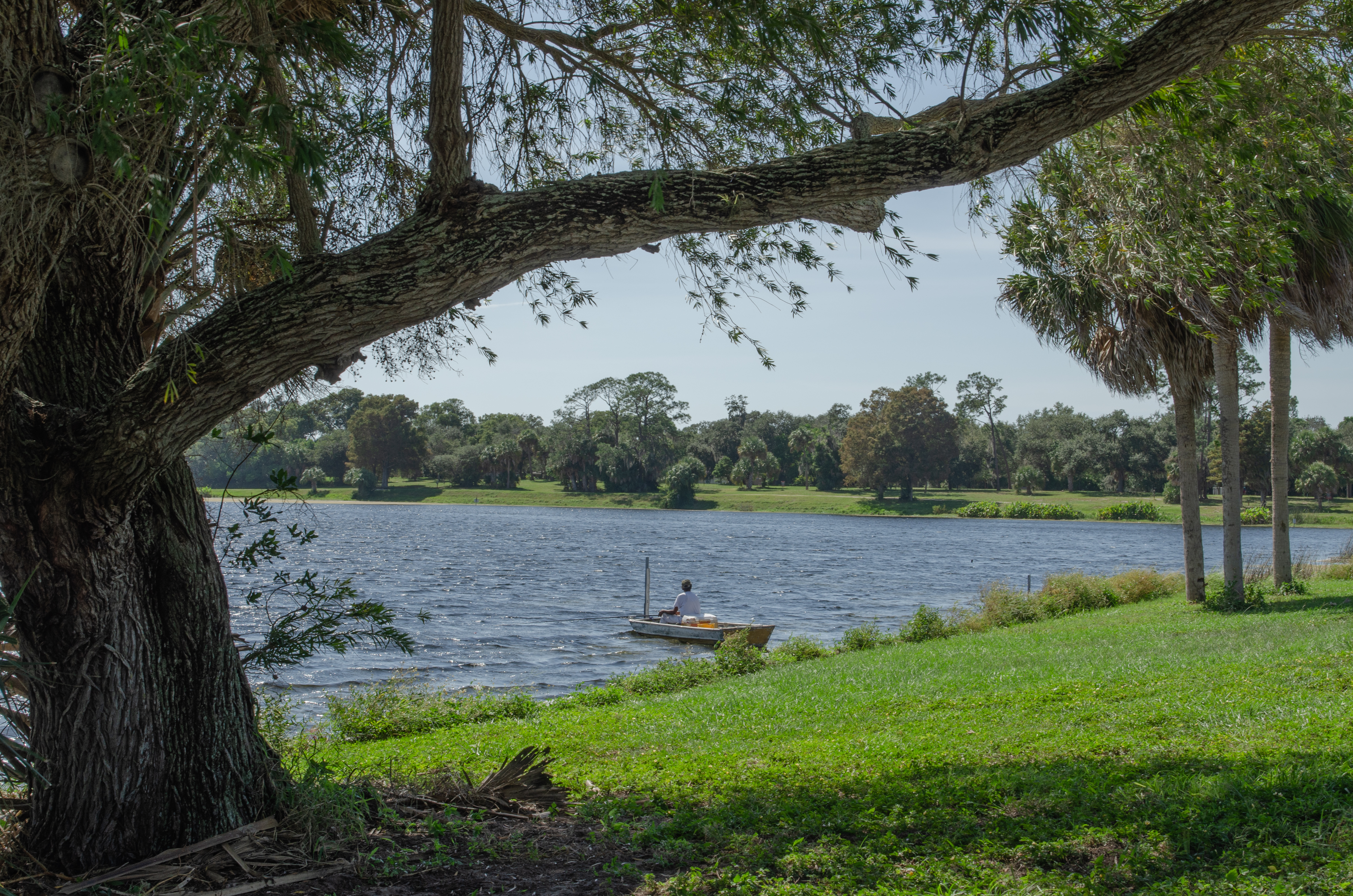
Taylor Lake Park

The years after World War II saw rapid growth as people began moving into the area, and Largo annexed surrounding lands. During the nuclear arms race, electronics companies like General Electric and Honeywell boosted the economy. The population increased to about 5,000 in 1960, to about 20,000 in 1970, and to about 70,000 in 2005. Largo's original area was 9/16 of a square mile (1.5 km^{2}). By 1982, Largo had grown to about 13 square miles (34 km^{2}) and to about 19 square miles (48 km^{2}) by 2010. The groves, farms, ranches, and forests have mostly given way to homes, shopping centers, and light industry. The growing population led to a need for expanded city services. All departments experienced rapid growth and quality improvements, especially under the leadership of the late Mayor Thom Feaster. In 1995, Largo Central Park opened on the site of the old Pinellas County Fairgrounds. It is the setting for the Largo Central Park Performing Arts Center and is located across the street from the Largo Public Library.

Democrat Patricia Gerard was the city's first female mayor. She defeated incumbent mayor Robert E. Jackson, the longest-serving elected Democrat in Pinellas County. Also, the city elected its first commissioner of African-American descent, Rodney J. Woods, in a landslide against a former commissioner.

== Geography ==
Largo is centrally located in Pinellas County, touching the Intracoastal Waterway to the southwest and Tampa Bay to the northeast. Clearwater is Largo's neighbor to the north. To the northwest are the towns of Belleair and Belleair Bluffs. The city of Pinellas Park lies south of eastern Largo. Seminole lies south of western Largo. The unincorporated community of Ridgecrest forms a large enclave between western and central Largo. Several county enclaves surround the city.

In 2010, Largo's total area was 18.6 square miles (48.1 km^{2}), of which 17.6 square miles (45.6 km^{2}) was land and 0.97 square miles (2.5 km^{2}), or 5.22%, was water. As of 2004, there were 651 acres (2.6 km^{2}) of park lands. The city's lowest elevation is sea level. At its highest, the city's elevation is about 69 feet (21 m). Largo is dotted with several lakes, the largest of which is Taylor Lake at 53 acres (210,000 m^{2}). Allen's Creek drains northeast Largo, flowing into Tampa Bay. McKay Creek flows through southwest Largo into the Intracoastal Waterway.

=== Climate ===
Largo is located on the Pinellas peninsula, so its climate is moderated by its proximity to the Gulf of Mexico and Tampa Bay. In winter, temperatures on the Pinellas Peninsula are warmer than on mainland Florida. Winters are generally drier than the rest of the year. According to the Köppen climate classification, the City of Largo has a humid subtropical climate zone (Cfa).

Most of the rainfall comes in the summer, when the sea breeze carries moisture from the Gulf inland. Largo's record low is 22 °F (−6 °C), recorded on December 13, 1962. Largo's record high is 100 °F (38 °C), recorded on July 5, 1995.

Climate data for Largo, FL
Month	Jan	Feb	Mar	Apr	May	Jun	Jul	Aug	Sep	Oct	Nov	Dec	Year
Mean daily maximum °F (°C)	65 (18)	67 (19)	71 (22)	76 (24)	81 (27)	84 (29)	85 (29)	85 (29)	84 (29)	80 (27)	73 (23)	69 (21)	77 (25)
Mean daily minimum °F (°C)	56 (13)	58 (14)	62 (17)	67 (19)	72 (22)	77 (25)	78 (26)	79 (26)	77 (25)	72 (22)	64 (18)	60 (16)	69 (20)
Average precipitation inches (mm)	2.4 (61)	2.1 (53)	2.26 (57)	2.1 (53)	2.21 (56)	5.43 (138)	5.84 (148)	6.34 (161)	6.21 (158)	2.11 (54)	1.8 (46)	2.66 (68)	41.46 (1,053)
Source: Insane Weather (1994–2023)

== Demographics ==
Historical population
Census	Pop.	Note	%±
1910	291		—
1920	599		105.8%
1930	1,429		138.6%
1940	1,031		−27.9%
1950	1,547		50.0%
1960	5,302		242.7%
1970	24,230		357.0%
1980	57,958		139.2%
1990	65,674		13.3%
2000	69,371		5.6%
2010	77,648		11.9%
2020	82,485		6.2%
U.S. Decennial Census

=== Racial and ethnic composition ===
Largo, Florida – Racial and ethnic composition Note: the US Census treats Hispanic/Latino as an ethnic category. This table excludes Latinos from the racial categories and assigns them to a separate category. Hispanics/Latinos may be of any race.
Race / Ethnicity (NH = Non-Hispanic)	Pop 2000	Pop 2010	Pop 2020	% 2000	% 2010	% 2020
White (NH)	62,359	62,703	59,815	89.89%	80.75%	72.52%
Black or African American (NH)	1,806	4,083	5,137	2.60%	5.26%	6.23%
Native American or Alaska Native (NH)	202	190	185	0.29%	0.24%	0.22%
Asian (NH)	1,161	2,043	2,641	1.67%	2.63%	3.20%
Pacific Islander or Native Hawaiian (NH)	55	116	105	0.08%	0.15%	0.13%
Some other race (NH)	85	158	459	0.12%	0.20%	0.56%
Mixed race or Multiracial (NH)	801	1,373	3,612	1.15%	1.77%	4.38%
Hispanic or Latino (any race)	2,902	6,982	10,531	4.18%	8.99%	12.77%
Total	69,371	77,648	82,485	100.00%	100.00%	100.00%

=== 2020 census ===
As of the 2020 census, Largo had a population of 82,485. There were 18,727 families residing in the city. The median age was 50.8 years. 14.1% of residents were under the age of 18 and 28.3% of residents were 65 years of age or older. For every 100 females there were 90.5 males, and for every 100 females age 18 and over there were 88.5 males age 18 and over.

100.0% of residents lived in urban areas, while 0.0% lived in rural areas.

There were 40,481 households in Largo, of which 16.9% had children under the age of 18 living in them. Of all households, 34.3% were married-couple households, 23.0% were households with a male householder and no spouse or partner present, and 34.1% were households with a female householder and no spouse or partner present. About 39.9% of all households were made up of individuals and 19.4% had someone living alone who was 65 years of age or older.

There were 47,694 housing units, of which 15.1% were vacant. The homeowner vacancy rate was 2.2% and the rental vacancy rate was 8.5%.

Racial composition as of the 2020 census
Race	Number	Percent
White	62,253	75.5%
Black or African American	5,355	6.5%
American Indian and Alaska Native	369	0.4%
Asian	2,680	3.2%
Native Hawaiian and Other Pacific Islander	109	0.1%
Some other race	3,699	4.5%
Two or more races	8,020	9.7%
Hispanic or Latino (of any race)	10,531	12.8%

=== 2010 census ===
As of the 2010 United States census, there were 77,648 people, 36,806 households, and 19,575 families residing in the city.

In 2010, there were 36,806 households, out of which 16.7% had children under the age of 18 living with them, 36.2% were married couples living together, 11.2% had a female householder with no husband present, and 48.5% were non-families. 39.6% of all households were made up of individuals, and 18.1% had someone living alone who was 65 years of age or older. The average household size was 2.02 and the average family size was 2.67.

In 2010, in the city, the population was spread out, with 15.6% under the age of 18, 7.1% from 18 to 24, 22.6% from 25 to 44, 28.6% from 45 to 64, and 26.0% who were 65 years of age or older. The median age was 48.2 years.

=== 2000 census ===
As of the census of 2000, there were 69,371 people, 34,041 households, and 18,382 families residing in the city. The population density was 4,429.1 inhabitants per square mile (1,710.1/km^{2}). There were 40,261 housing units at an average density of 2,570.5 per square mile (992.5/km^{2}). The racial makeup of the city was 92.71% White, 2.69% African American, 0.34% Native American, 1.69% Asian, 0.08% Pacific Islander, 0.99% from other races, and 1.49% from two or more races. 4.18% of the population is Hispanic or Latino of any race.

In 2000, there were 34,041 households, out of which 17.0% had children under the age of 18 living with them, 41.8% were married couples living together, 9.0% had a female householder with no husband present, and 46.0% were non-families. 38.5% of all households were made up of individuals, and 19.3% had someone living alone who was 65 years of age or older. The average household size was 1.99 and the average family size was 2.59.

In 2000, in the city, the population was spread out, with 15.6% under the age of 18, 6.1% from 18 to 24, 25.1% from 25 to 44, 23.0% from 45 to 64, and 30.1% who were 65 years of age or older. The median age was 48 years. For every 100 females, there were 87.0 males. For every 100 females age 18 and over, there were 83.9 males.

As of 2000, the median income for a household in the city was $32,217, and the median income for a family was $41,523. Males had a median income of $30,186 versus $24,477 for females. The per capita income for the city was $20,848. About 6.0% of families and 9.1% of the population were below the poverty line, including 12.0% of those under age 18 and 8.6% of those age 65 or over.

== Economy ==
The decline of agriculture, coupled with population growth beginning in the 1960s, largely transformed Largo into a bedroom community. Electronics, though important, could not fill the gap left by agriculture. Other light manufacturers fill various niches. The vast majority of jobs in Largo are in services and in retail sales.

The healthcare industry continues to grow to meet the needs of an aging population. Hospitals are among the area's strongest employers. Largo Medical Center, owned by the Hospital Corporation of America (HCA), was established in 1978; it consists of two separate campuses: its original campus near downtown Largo, and the former Sun Coast Hospital on Indian Rocks Road, which was renamed Largo Medical Center-Indian Rocks Campus after its acquisition by HCA.

At one time, Largo was the headquarters of Eckerd Corporation.

=== Top employers ===
According to the city's 2018 Community Development Division, the top employers in the city are:

#	Employer	No. of Employees
1	Pinellas County Sheriff's Office	2,862
2	Tech Data	2,012
3	Largo Medical Center	1,500
4	Florida Suncoast Hospice	1,100
5	City of Largo	900
6	SCC Soft Computer Inc.	800
7	Palms of Largo	770
8	Publix Super Markets Inc.	644
9	Pinellas County Schools Administration Building	500
10	Diagnostic Clinic Medical Group	428

== Arts and culture ==
=== Public library ===
The Largo Public Library opened in 1916 in the basement of the Town Hall, with a collection of about 560 books. In 1968, a new location was opened to house 14,000 titles. In 1977, a new library was erected on 5 acres (2 ha) of donated land. Following an expansion in 1989, the library held 250,000 items. Largo Public Library's current building was built in 2005.

== Government ==
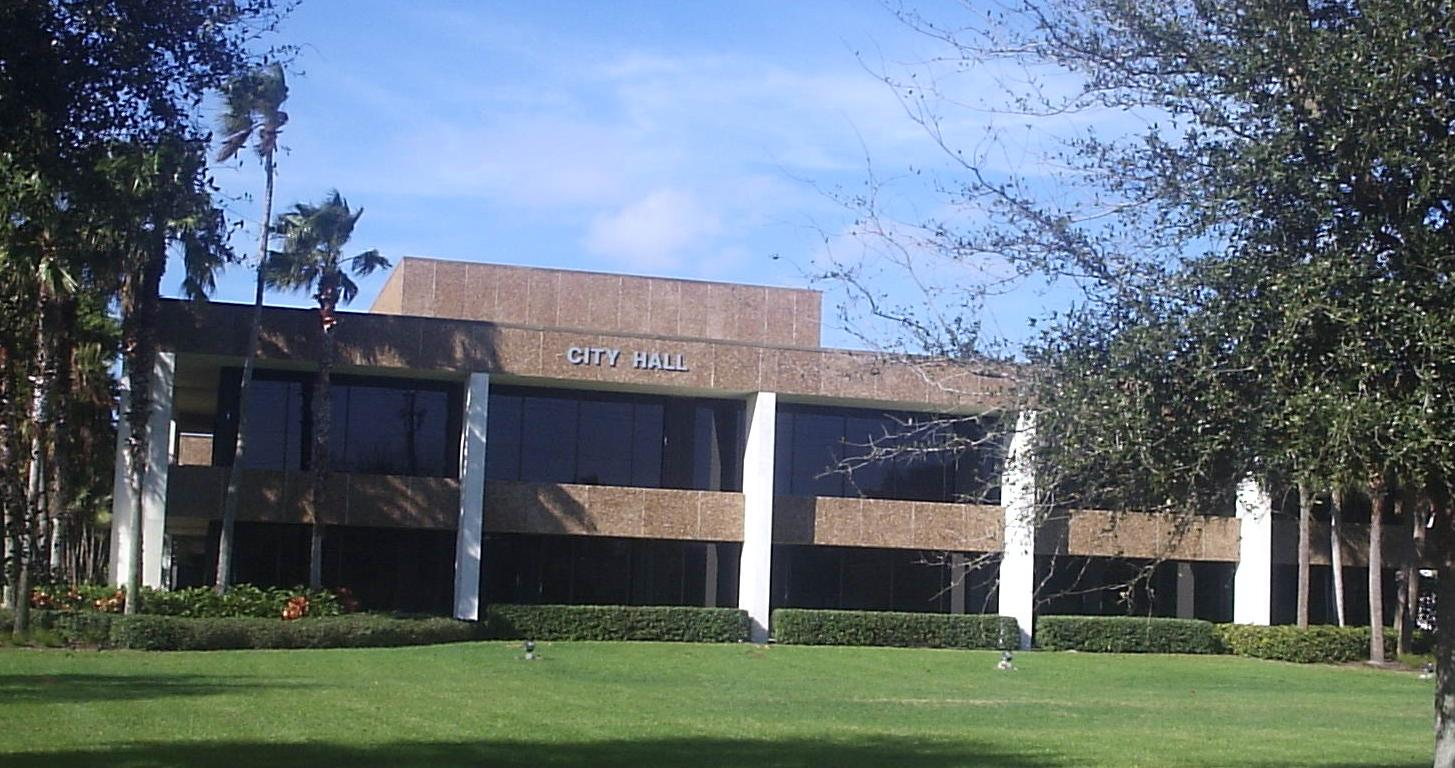
Largo City Hall

The City of Largo is governed by a city commission of seven people elected at large to staggered four-year terms. The mayor acts as a member and presiding officer of the commission. The commission's role encompasses the setting of city policy, exercising those duties imposed by the charter and law. In so doing, the city commission executes the city's powers by the passage of resolutions and ordinances. The commission appoints and directs the city manager and approves the city manager's appointments for city attorney, assistant city manager, and city clerk.

The city manager directs the administration in governing Largo and providing municipal services. The Administration Department includes the City Manager's Office, the City Attorney's Office, the City Clerk's Office, the Communications and Marketing Office, the Office of Management and Budget, and the City Attorney.

The city manager is appointed by and answerable to the city commission as a whole. The City of Largo is unique in that a supermajority of commissioners is required to terminate the city manager. The city manager appoints and supervises all department directors, and with commission approval, appoints the assistant city manager, the city clerk, and the city attorney.

== Education ==
Pinellas County Schools operates the city's public K–12 schools. The school district's administrative headquarters are located in Largo. The city's high school students attend Largo High School. The school mascot is the razorback boar, and the school athletic teams are called the Packers because of the influence of the citrus-packing industry on the town, most notably the packing plant of Senator John Taylor.

The main campus of Schiller International University is in Largo.

St. Patrick Catholic School has a campus on Trotter Road in Largo, providing a private education for grades Pre-K–8. Other private schools in the city include Veritas Academy.

== Infrastructure ==
=== Transportation ===
Largo is served by two international airports, Tampa International Airport and St. Petersburg–Clearwater International Airport. St. Petersburg–Clearwater Airport is located about 6 miles (9.7 km) east of downtown. Tampa International Airport is located about 20 miles (32 km) east of downtown on the other side of Tampa Bay. The Pinellas Suncoast Transit Authority provides bus service throughout Pinellas County and express service to Tampa. State Roads 686 and 688 pass through Largo to connect with Interstate 275, which connects with I-75. US 19 and US 19 Alternate run north–south through Largo. A grid of county roads connects Largo with its neighbors.

== Notable people ==
- Beth Bauer, former LPGA golfer
- Michael Bradley, current PGA golfer
- Irene Cara (1959–2022), singer and actress; lived and died in Largo
- Al Conover, former American football player and coach
- Sarah Mavis Dabbs, All-American Girls Professional Baseball League player
- D'Qwell Jackson, NFL linebacker, Indianapolis Colts
- Chloe Lowery, singer-songwriter
- Dexter McCluster, NFL running back/wide receiver, Kansas City Chiefs
- Brittney McConn, retired figure skater
- Casey Moore, current Nevada Wolf Pack running backs coach
- Lanny Poffo, professional wrestler
- Leonard T. Schroeder, retired U.S. Army colonel, first American soldier ashore on D-Day in World War II

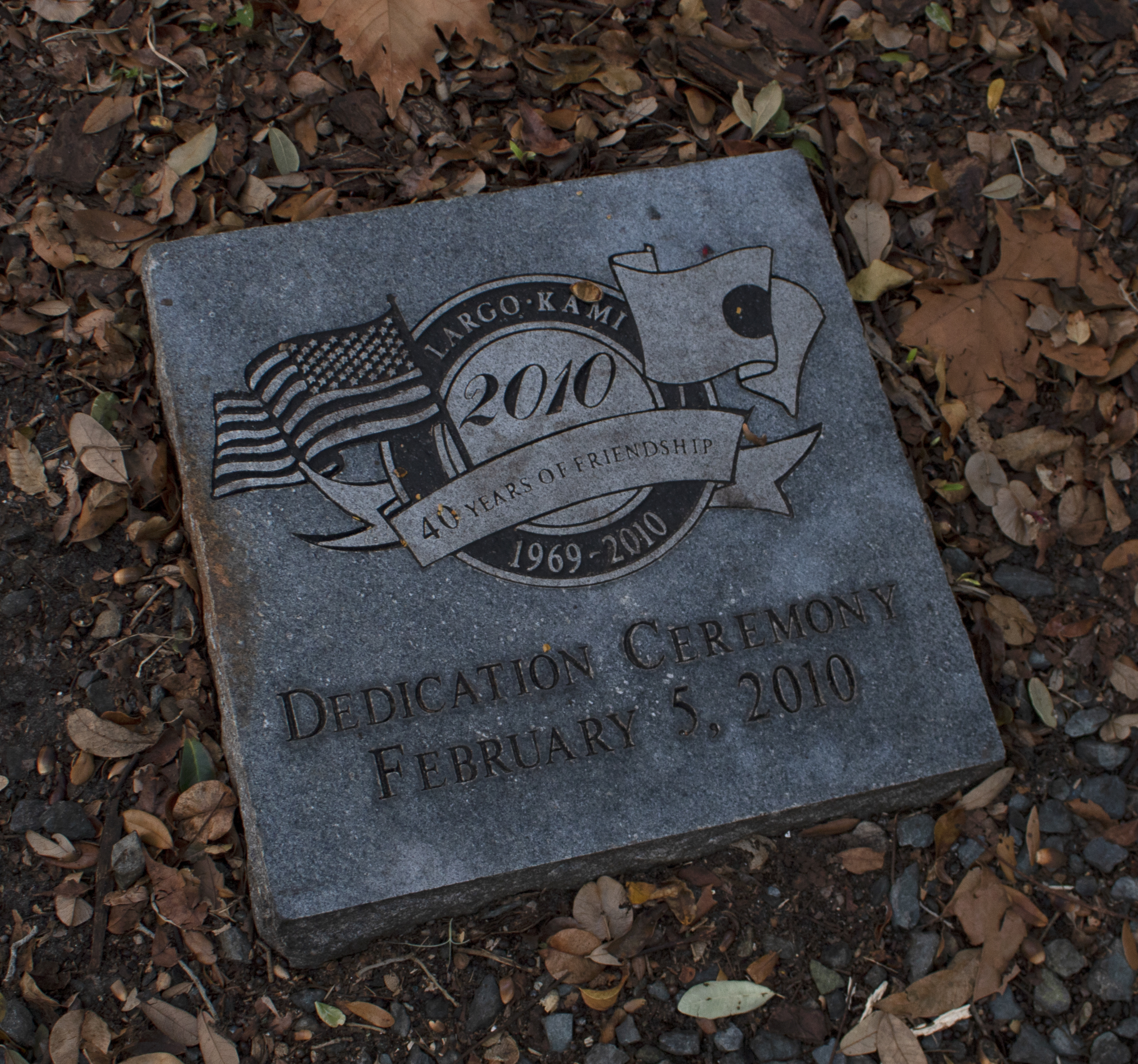
Stone plaque in Largo Central Park commemorating the relationship between Largo and Kami (dedicated February 5, 2010)

- John Stansel Taylor, Florida state senator
- Bill Young, U.S. Congressman
- Anastasija Zolotic, first American woman to win an Olympic gold medal in Taekwondo
- Dev Shah, 2023 Scripps National Spelling Bee champion

== Sister cities ==
- Kami (Kōchi, Japan) – since 1969

== See also ==
- History of Florida
- Maritime history of Florida
