= Ridgecrest, Florida =

- Census-designated place
- Location in Pinellas County and the state of Florida
- Coordinates: 27°53′32″N 82°48′27″W
- Country: United States
- State: Florida
- County: Pinellas

Area
  - Total: 0.91 sq mi (2.35 km^{2})
  - Land: 0.89 sq mi (2.30 km^{2})
  - Water: 0.019 sq mi (0.05 km^{2})
- Elevation: 43 ft (13 m)

Population (2020)
  - Total: 2,966
  - Density: 3,341.2/sq mi (1,290.04/km^{2})
- Time zone: UTC-5 (Eastern (EST))
  - Summer (DST): UTC-4 (EDT)
- FIPS code: 12-60275
- GNIS feature ID: 2403476

Ridgecrest is a census-designated place (CDP) in Pinellas County, Florida, United States. The population was 2,966 at the 2020 census.

== Geography ==
According to the United States Census Bureau, the CDP has a total area of 1.5 km^{2} (0.6 mi^{2}), of which 1.5 km^{2} (0.6 mi^{2}) is land and 1.75% is water.

== Demographics ==
Historical population
Census	Pop.	Note	%±
2000	2,453		—
2010	2,558		4.3%
2020	2,966		15.9%
U.S. Decennial Census

=== Racial and ethnic composition ===
Ridgecrest CDP, Florida – Racial and ethnic composition Note: the US Census treats Hispanic/Latino as an ethnic category. This table excludes Latinos from the racial categories and assigns them to a separate category. Hispanics/Latinos may be of any race.
Race / Ethnicity (NH = Non-Hispanic)	Pop 2000	Pop 2010	Pop 2020	% 2000	% 2010	% 2020
White alone (NH)	365	488	537	14.88%	19.08%	18.11%
Black or African American alone (NH)	1,964	1,719	1,746	80.07%	67.20%	58.87%
Native American or Alaska Native alone (NH)	2	5	7	0.08%	0.20%	0.24%
Asian alone (NH)	4	21	40	0.16%	0.82%	1.35%
Native Hawaiian or Pacific Islander alone (NH)	0	0	18	0.00%	0.00%	0.61%
Other race alone (NH)	11	10	19	0.45%	0.39%	0.64%
Mixed race or Multiracial (NH)	29	76	174	1.18%	2.97%	5.87%
Hispanic or Latino (any race)	78	239	425	3.18%	9.34%	14.33%
Total	2,453	2,558	2,966	100.00%	100.00%	100.00%

=== 2020 census ===
As of the 2020 census, Ridgecrest had a population of 2,966. The median age was 30.9 years. 35.4% of residents were under the age of 18 and 12.3% were 65 years of age or older. For every 100 females there were 80.6 males, and for every 100 females age 18 and over there were 68.9 males.

100.0% of residents lived in urban areas, while 0.0% lived in rural areas.

There were 936 households, of which 41.6% had children under the age of 18 living in them. Of all households, 28.3% were married-couple households, 15.0% were households with a male householder and no spouse or partner present, and 47.2% were households with a female householder and no spouse or partner present. About 23.2% of all households were made up of individuals, and 10.2% had someone living alone who was 65 years of age or older.

There were 990 housing units, of which 5.5% were vacant. The homeowner vacancy rate was 1.2% and the rental vacancy rate was 1.9%.

=== 2000 census ===
As of the census of 2000, there were 2,453 people, 781 households, and 623 families residing in the CDP. The population density was 1,691.3/km^{2} (4,354.6/mi^{2}). There were 862 housing units at an average density of 594.3/km^{2} (1,530.2/mi^{2}). The racial makeup of the CDP was 16.23% White, 80.64% African American, 0.08% Native American, 0.16% Asian, 0.98% from other races, and 1.92% from two or more races. Hispanic or Latino of any race were 3.18% of the population.

There were 781 households, out of which 39.4% had children under the age of 18 living with them, 32.5% were married couples living together, 41.6% had a female householder with no husband present, and 20.2% were non-families. 15.7% of all households were made up of individuals, and 6.9% had someone living alone who was 65 years of age or older. The average household size was 3.13 and the average family size was 3.51.

In the CDP, the population was spread out, with 36.9% under the age of 18, 8.8% from 18 to 24, 24.8% from 25 to 44, 20.3% from 45 to 64, and 9.2% who were 65 years of age or older. The median age was 29 years. For every 100 females, there were 80.9 males. For every 100 females age 18 and over, there were 69.4 males.

The median income for a household in the CDP was $32,535, and the median income for a family was $26,591. Males had a median income of $26,850 versus $20,664 for females. The per capita income for the CDP was $13,290. About 20.1% of families and 22.7% of the population were below the poverty line, including 35.4% of those under age 18 and 11.0% of those age 65 or over.
