= List of Ramones concerts =

The following is a list of concert performances by the Ramones, complete through 1996. They performed 2,263 concerts over the course of 22 years.

== 1974 ==
| Date | City | Country | Venue | Other act(s) |
|---|---|---|---|---|
| March 30, 1974 | New York City | United States | Performance Studio | |
| August 16, 1974 | New York City | United States | CBGB | Angel & the Snake |
| August 17, 1974 | New York City | United States | CBGB | Angel & the Snake |
| August 24, 1974 | New York City | United States | CBGB | |
| August 25, 1974 | New York City | United States | CBGB | |
| August 29, 1974 | New York City | United States | CBGB | |
| August 30, 1974 | New York City | United States | CBGB | |
| August 31, 1974 | New York City | United States | CBGB | Angel & the Snake |
| September 1, 1974 | New York City | United States | CBGB | |
| September 2, 1974 | New York City | United States | Unknown venue | |
| September 7, 1974 | New York City | United States | CBGB | |
| September 8, 1974 | New York City | United States | CBGB | |
| September 15, 1974 | New York City | United States | CBGB | |
| September 17, 1974 | New York City | United States | CBGB | |
| September 22, 1974 | New York City | United States | CBGB | |
| September 24, 1974 | New York City | United States | CBGB | |
| October 1, 1974 | New York City | United States | CBGB | |
| October 6, 1974 | New York City | United States | CBGB | |
| October 8, 1974 | New York City | United States | CBGB | |
| October 12, 1974 | New York City | United States | CBGB | Blondie |
| October 13, 1974 | New York City | United States | CBGB | Blondie |
| October 20, 1974 | New York City | United States | CBGB | |
| October 31, 1974 | New York City | United States | CBGB | Blondie |
| November 1, 1974 | New York City | United States | CBGB | Blondie |
| November 2, 1974 | New York City | United States | CBGB | Blondie |
| November 3, 1974 | New York City | United States | CBGB | Blondie |
| November 16, 1974 | New York City | United States | Performance Studio | |
| November 17, 1974 | New York City | United States | CBGB | |
| November 22, 1974 | New York City | United States | Truck and Warehouse Theater | Television |
| December 7, 1974 | New York City | United States | Performance Studio | Blondie |
| December 20, 1974 | New York City | United States | Performance Studio | |

== 1975 ==
| Date | City | Country | Venue | Other act(s) |
|---|---|---|---|---|
| February 3, 1975 | New York City | United States | Arturo Vega's Loft | |
| February 14, 1975 | New York City | United States | Brandy's II | |
| February 28, 1975 | New York City | United States | Performance Studio | |
| March 1, 1975 | New York City | United States | Performance Studio | |
| March 6, 1975 | New York City | United States | CBGB | |
| March 7, 1975 | New York City | United States | CBGB | |
| March 8, 1975 | New York City | United States | CBGB | |
| April 11, 1975 | New York City | United States | Performance Studio | |
| April 14, 1975 | New York City | United States | CBGB | Marbles |
| April 15, 1975 | New York City | United States | CBGB | Marbles |
| April 25, 1975 | New York City | United States | Performance Studio | Blondie |
| May 12, 1975 | New York City | United States | CBGB | Marbles |
| May 13, 1975 | New York City | United States | CBGB | Marbles |
| May 30, 1975 | New York City | United States | Coventry | The Heartbreakers |
| June 5, 1975 | New York City | United States | CBGB | Talking Heads; Mumps |
| June 6, 1975 | New York City | United States | CBGB | Talking Heads; Mumps |
| June 7, 1975 | New York City | United States | CBGB | Talking Heads; Mumps |
| June 8, 1975 | New York City | United States | CBGB | Talking Heads; Mumps |
| June 20, 1975 | New York City | United States | CBGB | Talking Heads |
| June 21, 1975 | New York City | United States | CBGB | Talking Heads |
| June 22, 1975 | New York City | United States | CBGB | Talking Heads |
| July 4, 1975 | New York City | United States | CBGB | Blondie |
| July 5, 1975 | New York City | United States | CBGB | Blondie |
| July 6, 1975 | New York City | United States | CBGB | Blondie |
| July 11, 1975 | Waterbury | United States | Palace Theater | |
| July 16, 1975 | New York City | United States | CBGB | Blondie; Tuff Darts; Talking Heads |
| July 17, 1975 | New York City | United States | CBGB | Blondie; Tuff Darts; Talking Heads |
| July 18, 1975 | New York City | United States | CBGB | Blondie; Tuff Darts; Talking Heads |
| July 31, 1975 | New York City | United States | CBGB | Talking Heads |
| August 1, 1975 | New York City | United States | CBGB | Talking Heads |
| August 22, 1975 | New York City | United States | CBGB | The Planets |
| August 23, 1975 | New York City | United States | CBGB | The Planets |
| August 24, 1975 | New York City | United States | CBGB | The Planets |
| September 12, 1975 | New York City | United States | Performance Studio | Blondie |
| September 13, 1975 | New York City | United States | Performance Studio | Blondie |
| October 3, 1975 | New York City | United States | Mother's Club | Blondie |
| October 4, 1975 | New York City | United States | Mother's Club | Blondie |
| October 5, 1975 | New York City | United States | Mother's Club | Blondie |
| October 24, 1975 | New York City | United States | CBGB | Blondie |
| October 25, 1975 | New York City | United States | CBGB | Blondie |
| October 26, 1975 | New York City | United States | CBGB | Blondie |
| November 21, 1975 | New York City | United States | CBGB | |
| November 22, 1975 | New York City | United States | CBGB | |
| November 23, 1975 | New York City | United States | CBGB | |
| December 18, 1975 | New York City | United States | CBGB | Mink DeVille |
| December 19, 1975 | New York City | United States | CBGB | Mink DeVille |
| December 31, 1975 | New York City | United States | Sea of Clouds | The Heartbreakers |

== 1976 ==
| Date | City | Country | Venue | Opening act(s) |
North America
| January 30, 1976 | New York City | United States | CBGB | Co-headlining with: The Heartbreakers |
| January 31, 1976 | New York City | United States | CBGB | Co-headlining with: The Heartbreakers |
| February 1, 1976 | New York City | United States | CBGB | Co-headlining with: The Heartbreakers |
| February 25, 1976 | Nashua | United States | Mount St. Mary Seminary | |
| February 26, 1976 | Cambridge | United States | The Club | |
| February 27, 1976 | Brockton | United States | Brockton High School | Maze |
| March 6, 1976 | Belleville | United States | Ricco's | The Runaways |
| March 22, 1976 | Roslyn | United States | My Father's Place | Co-headlining with: The Heartbreakers |
| April 1, 1976 | New York City | United States | CBGB | Milk 'N' Cookies |
| April 2, 1976 | New York City | United States | CBGB | Milk 'N' Cookies |
| April 3, 1976 | New York City | United States | CBGB | Milk 'N' Cookies |
| April 9, 1976 | Trenton | United States | Phase V | Co-headlining with: Blondie |
| April 10, 1976 | Trenton | United States | Phase V | Co-headlining with: Blondie |
| April 18, 1976 | New York City | United States | Max's Kansas City (Easter Rock Festival) | —N/a |
| May 10, 1976 | New York City | United States | The Bottom Line | Dr. Feelgood |
| May 11, 1976 | New York City | United States | The Bottom Line | Dr. Feelgood |
| May 12, 1976 | Cambridge | United States | The Club | |
| May 13, 1976 | New York City | United States | CBGB | Milk 'N' Cookies; Joe Cool |
| May 14, 1976 | New York City | United States | CBGB | Milk 'N' Cookies; Joe Cool |
| May 15, 1976 | New York City | United States | CBGB | Milk 'N' Cookies; Joe Cool |
| May 20, 1976 | Cambridge | United States | The Club | |
| May 21, 1976 | Cambridge | United States | The Club | |
| May 22, 1976 | Cambridge | United States | The Club | |
| May 28, 1976 | New Canaan | United States | New Canaan High School | |
| May 29, 1976 | Fairfield | United States | Andrew Warde High School | |
| June 10, 1976 | Dover | United States | The Showplace | |
| June 11, 1976 | New York City | United States | Max's Kansas City | |
| June 12, 1976 | New York City | United States | Max's Kansas City | |
| ~~June 19, 1976~~ | Cleveland | United States | Unknown venue | |
| June 20, 1976 | Youngstown | United States | Tomorrow Club | |
Europe
| July 4, 1976 | London | England | The Roundhouse | Supporting: Flamin' Groovies |
| July 5, 1976 | London | England | Dingwalls | Supporting: Flamin' Groovies |
North America
| July 13, 1976 | Roslyn | United States | My Father's Place | |
| July 16, 1976 | Islip | United States | Unknown venue | |
| July 17, 1976 | Islip | United States | Unknown venue | |
| July 18, 1976* | Asbury Park | United States | Giulio's South | Wolfgang |
| July 22, 1976* | New Haven | United States | Arcadia Ballroom | The Brats |
North America
| August 11, 1976 | West Hollywood | United States | The Roxy | Co-headlining with: Flamin' Groovies |
| August 12, 1976 | West Hollywood | United States | The Roxy | Co-headlining with: Flamin' Groovies |
| August 16, 1976 | West Hollywood | United States | Starwood Club | The Quick |
| August 17, 1976 | West Hollywood | United States | Starwood Club | The Quick |
| August 19, 1976 | San Francisco | United States | Savoy Tivoli | Duck's Breath Mystery Theatre |
| August 20, 1976 | San Francisco | United States | Savoy Tivoli | Duck's Breath Mystery Theatre |
| August 21, 1976 | San Francisco | United States | Savoy Tivoli | Duck's Breath Mystery Theatre |
| August 22, 1976 | San Francisco | United States | Savoy Tivoli | Duck's Breath Mystery Theatre |
| August 23, 1976 | Hungtinton Beach | United States | The Golden Bear | |
| August 24, 1976 | Hungtinton Beach | United States | The Golden Bear | |
| August 25, 1976 | Hungtinton Beach | United States | The Golden Bear | |
| August 26, 1976 | Hungtinton Beach | United States | Fest A Faire | |
| August 27, 1976 | Redondo Beach | United States | The Smokestack | Earth Quake |
| August 28, 1976 | Redondo Beach | United States | The Smokestack | Earth Quake |
| August 29, 1976 | Berkeley | United States | The Keystone | Earth Quake |
| September 2, 1976 | Hempstead | United States | Calderone Concert Hall | The Good Rats |
| September 3, 1976 | Norwalk | United States | Friar Tuck's | |
| September 4, 1976 | Norwalk | United States | Friar Tuck's | |
| September 9, 1976 | New York City | United States | CBGB | The Poppees |
| September 10, 1976 | New York City | United States | CBGB | The Poppees |
| September 11, 1976 | New York City | United States | CBGB | The Fast |
| September 12, 1976 | White Plains | United States | Fore 'n' Aft | |
| September 14, 1976 | Poughkeepsie | United States | Sal's Last Chance Saloon | Blondie |
| September 17, 1976 | Westport | United States | Players Tavern | Dirty Angels |
| September 18, 1976 | Westport | United States | Players Tavern | Dirty Angels |
| September 19, 1976 | Dover | United States | The Showplace | Talking Heads |
| September 24, 1976* | Toronto | Canada | New Yorker Theater | John Lovsin and his Invisible Band |
| September 25, 1976 | Toronto | Canada | New Yorker Theater | John Lovsin and his Invisible Band |
| September 27, 1976 | Roslyn | United States | My Father's Place | Talking Heads |
| September 28, 1976 | Roslyn | United States | My Father's Place | Talking Heads |
| October 8, 1976 | New York City | United States | Max's Kansas City | Talking Heads |
| October 9, 1976 | New York City | United States | Max's Kansas City | Talking Heads |
| October 17, 1976 | Detroit | United States | Royal Oak Music Theatre | Supporting: Flamin' Groovies |
| October 22, 1976 | Washington, D.C. | United States | Childe Harold | |
| October 23, 1976 | Washington, D.C. | United States | Childe Harold | |
| October 24, 1976 | Washington, D.C. | United States | Childe Harold | |
| October 29, 1976 | Johnson City | United States | Freedom Hall Civic Center | Supporting: Blue Öyster Cult |
| October 30, 1976 | Richmond | United States | Shafer Court | Single Bullet Theory; Rocking Horse |
| November 12, 1976 | Newport | United States | Unknown venue | |
| November 13, 1976 | Newport | United States | Unknown venue | |
| November 24, 1976 | Atlanta | United States | Alex Cooley's Electric Ballroom | Gasolin' |
| November 25, 1976 | Atlanta | United States | Alex Cooley's Electric Ballroom | Gasolin' |
| November 26, 1976 | Atlanta | United States | Alex Cooley's Electric Ballroom | Gasolin' |
| November 27, 1976 | Atlanta | United States | Alex Cooley's Electric Ballroom | Gasolin' |

* - Show included a matinée

=== Typical setlist ===
1. "Loudmouth"
2. "Beat on the Brat"
3. "Blitzkrieg Bop"
4. "I Remember You"
5. "Glad to See You Go"
6. "Chain Saw" or "Gimme Gimme Shock Treatment"
7. "53rd & 3rd"
8. "I Wanna Be Your Boyfriend"
9. "Havana Affair"
10. "Listen to My Heart"
11. "California Sun" (Joe Jones cover)
12. "Judy Is a Punk"
13. "I Don't Wanna Walk Around with You"
14. "Today Your Love, Tomorrow the World"

Encore:

15. "Now I Wanna Sniff Some Glue"
16. "Let's Dance" (Chris Montez cover)

== 1977 ==
| Date | City | Country | Venue | Supporting act(s) |
North America
| January 28, 1977 | Boston | United States | The Rathskeller | —N/a |
| January 29, 1977 | Boston | United States | The Rathskeller | —N/a |
| January 30, 1977 | Boston | United States | The Rathskeller | —N/a |
| February 2, 1977* | Roslyn | United States | My Father's Place | —N/a |
| February 3, 1977 | New York City | United States | CBGB | Suicide |
| February 4, 1977 | New York City | United States | CBGB | Suicide |
| February 4, 1977 | Uniondale | United States | Nassau Coliseum | Supporting: Blue Öyster Cult |
| February 4, 1977 | New York City | United States | CBGB | Suicide |
| February 5, 1977 | New York City | United States | CBGB | Suicide |
| February 8, 1977 | Dover | United States | The Showplace | —N/a |
| February 10, 1977 | Poughkeepsie | United States | Mid-Hudson Civic Center | Supporting: Blue Öyster Cult |
| February 16, 1977 | West Hollywood | United States | Whisky a Go Go | Co-headlining with: Blondie |
| February 17, 1977 | West Hollywood | United States | Whisky a Go Go | Co-headlining with: Blondie |
| February 18, 1977 | West Hollywood | United States | Whisky a Go Go | Co-headlining with: Blondie |
| February 19, 1977 | West Hollywood | United States | Whisky a Go Go | Co-headlining with: Blondie |
| February 20, 1977 | West Hollywood | United States | Whisky a Go Go | Co-headlining with: Blondie |
| February 22, 1977 | San Francisco | United States | Mabuhay Gardens | The Nuns |
| February 23, 1977 | San Francisco | United States | Mabuhay Gardens | The Nuns |
| February 24, 1977 | Campbell | United States | Bodega | —N/a |
| February 25, 1977 | Berkeley | United States | The Keystone | Earthquake |
| February 26, 1977 | Berkeley | United States | The Keystone | Stoneground |
| February 28, 1977 | Palo Alto | United States | The Keystone | —N/a |
| March 2, 1977 | Sacramento | United States | Slick Willy's | —N/a |
| March 4, 1977 | Bremerton | United States | Natacha's | Baby |
| March 5, 1977 | Aberdeen | United States | Rocker Tavern | —N/a |
| March 6, 1977* | Seattle | United States | Olympic Hotel | Tom Petty and the Heartbreakers |
| March 10, 1977 | Encinitas | United States | La Paloma Theatre | Hollywood Stars |
| March 11, 1977 | San Bernardino | United States | The Bogart | —N/a |
| March 12, 1977* | San Diego | United States | The Backdoor | Hollywood Stars |
| March 13, 1977 | Norwalk | United States | Goldenwest Ballroom | Van Halen; The Dogs |
| March 15, 1977 | Denver | United States | Ebbets Field | Ravers |
| March 16, 1977 | Denver | United States | Ebbets Field | Ravers |
| March 25, 1977 | Buffalo | United States | Moot Hall | The Dictators |
| March 26, 1977 | Countryside | United States | Union Plaza | —N/a |
| March 27, 1977 | Detroit | United States | Unknown venue | —N/a |
| March 28, 1977 | Ann Arbor | United States | The Second Chance | Sonic's Rendezvous Band |
| March 31, 1977 | New York City | United States | CBGB | —N/a |
| April 1, 1977 | New York City | United States | CBGB | —N/a |
| April 2, 1977* | New York City | United States | CBGB | —N/a |
| April 3, 1977 | New York City | United States | CBGB | —N/a |
| April 8, 1977 | Westport | United States | Westport Country Playhouse | —N/a |
| April 9, 1977 | Philadelphia | United States | Houston Hall | —N/a |
| April 10, 1977 | West Islip | United States | Ubie's OTJ | —N/a |
| April 13, 1977 | Roslyn | United States | My Father's Place | The Cramps |
| April 14, 1977 | Roslyn | United States | My Father's Place | The Cramps |
| April 15, 1977 | Salisbury | United States | The Frolics | DMZ |
| April 16, 1977 | Salisbury | United States | The Frolics | DMZ |
| April 17, 1977 | Boston | United States | The Rathskeller | —N/a |
| April 20, 1977 | New York City | United States | CBGB | The Cramps |
Europe
| April 24, 1977 | Zürich | Switzerland | Volkshaus | Co-headlining with: Talking Heads |
| April 27, 1977 | Geneva | Switzerland | Faubourg Hall | Co-headlining with: Talking Heads |
| April 28, 1977 | Lyon | France | La Cigale | Co-headlining with: Talking Heads |
| April 30, 1977 | Le Havre | France | Le Chapiteau | Co-headlining with: Talking Heads |
| May 2, 1977 | Paris | France | Le Bataclan | Co-headlining with: Talking Heads |
| May 3, 1977 | Orléans | France | Unknown venue | Co-headlining with: Talking Heads |
| May 4, 1977 | Lille | France | Citadel of Lille | Co-headlining with: Talking Heads |
| May 5, 1977 | Brussels | Belgium | Paul Emile-Janson Auditorium | Co-headlining with: Talking Heads |
| May 6, 1977 | Amsterdam | Netherlands | Paradiso | Co-headlining with: Talking Heads |
| May 7, 1977 | Eindhoven | Netherlands | Effenaar | Co-headlining with: Talking Heads |
| May 8, 1977 | Groningen | Netherlands | Huize Maas | Co-headlining with: Talking Heads |
| May 10, 1977 | Rotterdam | Netherlands | The Lantern | Co-headlining with: Talking Heads |
| May 11, 1977 | Utrecht | Netherlands | Rasa | Co-headlining with: Talking Heads |
| May 12, 1977 | Copenhagen | Denmark | Unknown venue | Co-headlining with: Talking Heads |
| May 15, 1977 | Stockholm | Sweden | Jarlateatern | Co-headlining with: Talking Heads |
| May 16, 1977 | Helsinki | Finland | Kulttuuritalo | Co-headlining with: Talking Heads |
| May 17, 1977 | Tampere | Finland | Tampere Polytechnic | Co-headlining with: Talking Heads |
| May 19, 1977 | Liverpool | England | Eric's | Co-headlining with: Talking Heads |
| May 20, 1977 | Leeds | England | Leeds Polytechnic | Co-headlining with: Talking Heads |
| May 21, 1977 | Glasgow | Scotland | University of Strathclyde | Co-headlining with: Talking Heads |
| May 22, 1977 | Manchester | England | The Electric Circus | Co-headlining with: Talking Heads |
| May 23, 1977 | Doncaster | England | Outlook Club | Co-headlining with: Talking Heads |
| May 24, 1977 | Birmingham | England | Barbarella's | Co-headlining with: Talking Heads |
| May 26, 1977 | Aylesbury | England | Maxwell Hall | Co-headlining with: Talking Heads |
| May 28, 1977 | Slough | England | Slough College | Co-headlining with: The Boomtown Rats; Talking Heads |
| May 29, 1977 | Croydon | England | The Greyhound | Co-headlining with: Talking Heads |
| May 30, 1977 | Bristol | England | Colston Hall | Co-headlining with: Talking Heads |
| May 31, 1977 | Swindon | England | Brunel Rooms | Co-headlining with: Talking Heads |
| June 1, 1977 | Plymouth | England | Plymouth Top Rank | Co-headlining with: Talking Heads |
| June 2, 1977 | Penzance | England | Penzance Winter Gardens | Co-headlining with: Talking Heads |
| June 4, 1977 | Canterbury | England | Canterbury Odeon | Co-headlining with: Talking Heads |
| June 5, 1977 | London | England | The Roundhouse | Co-headlining with: Talking Heads; Supported by: The Saints |
| June 6, 1977 | London | England | The Roundhouse | Co-headlining with: Talking Heads; Supported by: The Saints |
North America
| June 9, 1977 | New York City | United States | CBGB | The Cramps |
| June 10, 1977 | New York City | United States | CBGB | The Cramps |
| June 11, 1977 | New York City | United States | CBGB | The Cramps |
| June 17, 1977* | Toronto | Canada | New Yorker Theater | Dead Boys |
| June 18, 1977 | Toronto | Canada | New Yorker Theater | Dead Boys |
| June 21, 1977 | Schaumburg | United States | B'Ginnings | —N/a |
| June 23, 1977 | Madison | United States | El Tejon | Nicknames |
| June 24, 1977 | Waukesha | United States | Waukesha County Exposition Center | —N/a |
| June 26, 1977 | Ann Arbor | United States | The Second Chance | Sonic's Rendezvous Band |
| June 28, 1977 | Cincinnati | United States | Bogart's | The Nerves |
| June 29, 1977 | Waukegan | United States | Unknown venue | —N/a |
| June 30, 1977 | Rockford | United States | Stardust Lounge | —N/a |
| July 1, 1977 | Saint Paul | United States | Kelly's Pub | The Suicide Commandos |
| July 2, 1977 | Saint Paul | United States | Kelly's Pub | The Suicide Commandos |
| July 4, 1977 | Milwaukee | United States | Henry Maier Festival Park (Summerfest) | —N/a |
| July 6, 1977 | Chicago | United States | Ivanhoe Theater | The Dictators |
| July 8, 1977 | Lebanon | United States | Unknown venue | —N/a |
| July 14, 1977 | Austin | United States | Armadillo World Headquarters | Aalon |
| July 15, 1977 | Houston | United States | Liberty Hall | Equinox; Aalon |
| July 16, 1977 | Houston | United States | Liberty Hall | Equinox; Aalon |
| July 18, 1977 | San Antonio | United States | Randy's Rodeo | The Nerves |
| July 20, 1977 | Killeen | United States | Tremors | —N/a |
| July 24, 1977 | Dallas | United States | Electric Ballroom | The Nervebreakers; Mink DeVille |
| July 28, 1977 | Huntington Beach | United States | The Golden Bear | —N/a |
| July 30, 1977 | San Francisco | United States | Winterland Arena | Co-headlining with: The Dictators; Supported by: The Nuns; Widowmaker |
| August 4, 1977 | Seattle | United States | Paramount Theatre | Tom Petty and the Heartbreakers; Mink Deville |
| August 5, 1977 | Portland | United States | Paramount Theater | Tom Petty and the Heartbreakers; Mink Deville |
| August 6, 1977 | Vancouver | Canada | Commodore Ballroom | The Lewd |
| August 10, 1977 | West Hollywood | United States | Whisky a Go Go | Milk 'N' Cookies |
North America
| October 1, 1977 | Dover | United States | The Showplace | —N/a |
| October 4, 1977 | Waterbury | United States | Palace Theater | Supporting: Iggy Pop |
| October 6, 1977 | New York City | United States | The Palladium | Supporting: Iggy Pop |
| October 8, 1977 | Montreal | Canada | Auditorium le Plateau | Supporting: Iggy Pop |
| October 9, 1977 | Toronto | Canada | Masonic Temple | Supporting: Iggy Pop |
| October 11, 1977 | Washington, D.C. | United States | The Bayou | —N/a |
| October 12, 1977 | Upper Darby Township | United States | Tower Theater | Supporting: Iggy Pop |
| October 15, 1977 | Baltimore | United States | Baltimore Civic Center | Supporting: Iggy Pop |
| October 19, 1977 | Cleveland | United States | Cleveland Music Hall | Supporting: Iggy Pop |
| October 20, 1977 | Detroit | United States | Cobo Center | Supporting: Iggy Pop |
| October 21, 1977 | West Hollywood | United States | Whisky a Go Go | Martin Mull |
| October 22, 1977 | Chicago | United States | Aragon Ballroom | Supporting: Iggy Pop |
| October 27, 1977 | New York City | United States | CBGB | Suicide |
| October 28, 1977 | New York City | United States | CBGB | Suicide |
| October 29, 1977 | New York City | United States | CBGB | —N/a |
| October 30, 1977 | New York City | United States | CBGB | —N/a |
| November 5, 1977 | Providence | United States | Alumnae Hall | Nervous Eaters |
| November 7, 1977 | Poughkeepsie | United States | Unknown venue | —N/a |
| November 8, 1977 | Philadelphia | United States | Stars | —N/a |
| November 11, 1977 | Pittsburgh | United States | Antonino's Showcase | —N/a |
| November 12, 1977 | Pittsburgh | United States | Antonino's Showcase | —N/a |
| November 14, 1977 | Marcy | United States | Four Acres | —N/a |
| November 15, 1977 | Providence | United States | Lupo's Heartbreak Hotel | —N/a |
| November 16, 1977 | Amherst | United States | Amherst College | —N/a |
| November 18, 1977 | Boston | United States | Orpheum Theatre | Talking Heads; Eddie and the Hot Rods |
| November 19, 1977 | Passaic | United States | Capitol Theatre | Tuff Darts; Talking Heads; Eddie and the Hot Rods |
| November 23, 1977 | Detroit | United States | Masonic Temple Theater | Skafish; Talking Heads; Eddie and the Hot Rods |
| November 25, 1977 | Chicago | United States | Aragon Ballroom | Skafish; Eddie and the Hot Rods |
Europe
| December 17, 1977 | Carlisle | England | Carlisle Market Hall | The Rezillos |
| December 18, 1977 | Edinburgh | Scotland | Clouds | The Rezillos |
| December 19, 1977 | Glasgow | Scotland | The Apollo | The Rezillos |
| December 20, 1977 | Newcastle | England | Newcastle City Hall | The Rezillos |
| December 21, 1977 | Manchester | England | Manchester Apollo | The Rezillos |
| December 23, 1977 | Cambridge | England | Cambridge Corn Exchange | The Rezillos |
| December 28, 1977 | Birmingham | England | Top Rank Suite | The Rezillos |
| December 29, 1977 | Hanley | England | Victoria Hall | The Rezillos |
| December 30, 1977 | Aylesbury | England | Maxwell Hall | Generation X The Rezillos |
| December 31, 1977 | London | England | Rainbow Theatre (Recording for It's Alive) | Generation X The Rezillos |

* - These shows included a matinée

=== First setlist (Leg 2) ===
1. "Loudmouth"
2. "Beat on the Brat"
3. "Blitzkrieg Bop"
4. "I Remember You"
5. "Glad to See You Go"
6. "Gimme Gimme Shock Treatment"
7. "You're Gonna Kill That Girl"
8. "Carbona Not Glue"
9. "Oh Oh I Love Her So"
10. "Commando"
11. "I Wanna Be Your Boyfriend"
12. "Havana Affair"
13. "Listen to My Heart"
14. California Sun
15. "Judy Is a Punk"
16. "I Don't Wanna Walk Around With You"
17. "Pinhead"

Encore:

18. "Now I Wanna Sniff Some Glue"
19. "Today Your Love, Tomorrow the World"

Encore 2:

20. "Suzy Is a Headbanger"
21. "Chain Saw"
22. "Let's Dance" (Chris Montez cover)

Encore 3:

23. "53rd & 3rd"
24. "Now I Wanna Be a Good Boy"

=== Second setlist (Leg 5) ===
1. "Rockaway Beach"
2. "Teenage Lobotomy"
3. "Blitzkrieg Bop"
4. "I Wanna Be Well"
5. "Glad to See You Go"
6. "Gimme Gimme Shock Treatment"
7. "You're Gonna Kill That Girl"
8. "I Don't Care"
9. "Sheena Is a Punk Rocker"
10. "Havana Affair"
11. "Commando"
12. "Here Today, Gone Tomorrow"
13. "Surfin' Bird" (The Trashmen cover)
14. "Cretin Hop"
15. "Listen to My Heart"
16. "California Sun" (Joe Jones cover)
17. "I Don't Wanna Walk Around with You"
18. "Pinhead"

Encore:

19. "Do You Want to Dance?" (Bobby Freeman cover)
20. "Chain Saw"
21. "Today Your Love, Tomorrow the World"

Encore 2:

22. "Now I Wanna Be a Good Boy"
23. "Suzy Is a Headbanger"
24. "Let's Dance" (Chris Montez cover)

Encore 3:

25. "Oh Oh I Love Her So"
26. "Now I Wanna Sniff Some Glue"
27. "We're a Happy Family"

== 1978 ==
| Date | City | Country | Venue | Supporting act(s) |
Europe
| January 1, 1978 | London | England | Rainbow Theatre | Generation X The Rezillos |
North America
| January 5, 1978 | New Haven | United States | Toad's Place | —N/a |
| January 6, 1978 | Hartford | United States | Hartford Civic Center | —N/a |
| January 7, 1978 | New York City | United States | The Palladium | The Runaways; Suicide |
| January 9, 1978 | Dover | United States | The Showplace | —N/a |
| January 13, 1978 | Tonawanda | United States | He's & She's | The Runaways; Suicide |
| January 14, 1978 | Detroit | United States | Masonic Temple Theater | The Runaways; Sonic's Rendezvous Band |
| January 15, 1978 | Youngstown | United States | Tomorrow Club | The Runaways |
| January 16, 1978 | Cleveland | United States | Agora Ballroom | The Runaways |
| January 18, 1978 | Madison | United States | Bunky's | The Runaways |
| January 19, 1978 | Milwaukee | United States | The Electric Ballroom | The Runaways |
| January 20, 1978 | Chicago | United States | Aragon Ballroom | The Runaways; The Diodes |
| January 21, 1978 | Minneapolis | United States | Minneapolis Auditorium | The Runaways |
| January 23, 1978 | Kansas City | United States | One Block West | The Runaways |
| January 27, 1978 | Santa Monica | United States | Santa Monica Civic Auditorium | The Runaways; The Quick |
| January 30, 1978 | San Francisco | United States | Old Waldorf | Crime; The Dils |
| January 31, 1978 | San Francisco | United States | Old Waldorf | Crime; The Dils |
| February 2, 1978 | Eugene | United States | Lane County Civic Center | —N/a |
| February 3, 1978 | Seattle | United States | Paramount Theatre | The Runaways |
| February 4, 1978 | Portland | United States | Paramount Theater | The Runaways; The Lewd |
| February 7, 1978 | San Diego | United States | Montezuma Hall | The Runaways |
| February 8, 1978 | Tempe | United States | Dooley's | The Runaways |
| February 10, 1978 | Albuquerque | United States | University of New Mexico | Kidd |
| February 12, 1978 | Tulsa | United States | Cain's Ballroom | —N/a |
| February 14, 1978 | San Antonio | United States | Randy's Rodeo | The Runaways |
| February 17, 1978 | Austin | United States | Armadillo World Headquarters | The Runaways |
| February 18, 1978 | Fort Worth | United States | Panther Hall | The Runaways |
| February 19, 1978 | Houston | United States | On the Border | The Runaways |
| February 21, 1978 | New Orleans | United States | McAlister Auditorium | The Runaways |
| February 22, 1978 | Baton Rouge | United States | The Kingfish | The Runaways |
| February 25, 1978 | Atlanta | United States | Atlanta Municipal Auditorium | The Runaways; Cruise-o-Matic |
| February 27, 1978 | Charlotte | United States | Charlotte Park Center | The Runaways |
| March 2, 1978 | Orlando | United States | The Great Southern Music Hall | The Runaways |
| March 3, 1978 | Miami | United States | Maurice Gusman Cultural Center | The Runaways |
| March 6, 1978 | Belleville | United States | Downtown Belleville | The Runaways |
| March 8, 1978 | Ann Arbor | United States | The Second Chance | Willie Alexander and the Boom Boom Band; Destroy All Monsters |
| March 9, 1978 | Columbus | United States | Sugar Shack | —N/a |
| March 10, 1978 | Cincinnati | United States | Bogart's | The Runaways |
| March 12, 1978 | Urbana | United States | Champaign County Fairgrounds | —N/a |
| March 13, 1978 | Akron | United States | The Flying Machine | The Runaways |
| March 15, 1978 | Norfolk | United States | Old Dominion University | The Runaways |
| March 17, 1978 | Baltimore | United States | Painter's Mill Music Fair | The Runaways |
| March 18, 1978 | Upper Darby Township | United States | Tower Theater | The Runaways; The Jam |
| March 19, 1978 | Washington, D.C. | United States | Warner Theatre | The Runaways |
| March 21, 1978 | Boston | United States | Paradise Rock Club | The Runaways |
| March 22, 1978 | Boston | United States | Paradise Rock Club | The Runaways |
| March 24, 1978 | Hempstead | United States | Calderone Concert Hall | The Runaways |
| March 25, 1978 | Passaic | United States | Capitol Theatre | The Runaways |
| March 31, 1978 | Syracuse | United States | The Brookside | The Runaways; The Flashcubes |
| April 1, 1978 | Cowanshannock | United States | The Landmark | The Runaways |
| April 2, 1978 | Jamestown | United States | Jamestown Savings Bank Arena | The Runaways |
| April 4, 1978 | Toronto | Canada | University of Toronto | —N/a |
| April 5, 1978 | Toronto | Canada | University of Toronto | —N/a |
| April 16, 1978 | Trenton | United States | Trenton State College | Dead Boys |
| April 20, 1978 | Rochester | United States | Penny Arcade | Czar |
| April 21, 1978 | Wilkes-Barre | United States | Wilkes University | Supporting act for: Patti Smith |
| April 23, 1978 | Toledo | United States | Toledo Speedway | —N/a |
| April 24, 1978 | East Lansing | United States | Dooley's | —N/a |
| April 25, 1978 | Indianapolis | United States | The Vogue | —N/a |
| April 27, 1978 | Franklin | United States | Unknown venue | —N/a |
| April 29, 1978 | Willimantic | United States | The Shaboo Inn | —N/a |
| May 4, 1978 | New York City | United States | CBGB (Tommy's last show) | —N/a |
North America
| June 29, 1978 | Poughkeepsie | United States | Sal's Last Chance Saloon (Marky's first show) | —N/a |
| July 1, 1978 | East Brunswick | United States | East Brunswick High School | —N/a |
| July 2, 1978 | Warwick | United States | TG's East | Jumpers |
| July 5, 1978 | Roslyn | United States | My Father's Place | Richard Hell and the Voidoids |
| July 7, 1978 | Boston | United States | Paradise Rock Club | The Real Kids |
| July 8, 1978 | Boston | United States | Paradise Rock Club | The Real Kids |
| July 9, 1978 | Boston | United States | Paradise Rock Club | The Real Kids |
| July 10, 1978 | Providence | United States | Lupo's Heartbreak Hotel | —N/a |
| July 12, 1978 | Portland | United States | The Loft | —N/a |
| July 16, 1978 | Youngstown | United States | Tomorrow Club | David Johansen |
| July 17, 1978 | East Lansing | United States | Dooley's | Destroy All Monsters |
| July 19, 1978 | Flint | United States | Flint Athletic Club | —N/a |
| July 21, 1978 | Columbus | United States | Bicentennial Pavilion | —N/a |
| July 23, 1978 | Cincinnati | United States | Bogart's | —N/a |
| July 25, 1978 | Palatine | United States | Unknown venue | —N/a |
| July 26, 1978 | Madison | United States | Bunky's | —N/a |
| July 27, 1978 | DeKalb | United States | Red Lion Inn | Wazmo Nariz |
| July 29, 1978 | Kansas City | United States | Granada Theater | —N/a |
| July 30, 1978 | Springfield | United States | Springfield Expo Center | —N/a |
| July 31, 1978 | St. Louis | United States | Mississippi Nights | The Symptoms |
| August 1, 1978 | Champaign | United States | Red Lion Inn | —N/a |
| August 2, 1978 | Moraine | United States | The Alley | —N/a |
| August 5, 1978 | Asbury Park | United States | Asbury Park Convention Hall | Supporting act for: Patti Smith |
| August 11, 1978 | New York City | United States | Hurrah | The Mumps |
| August 12, 1978 | New York City | United States | Hurrah | The Mumps |
| August 13, 1978 | New York City | United States | Hurrah | The Mumps |
| August 18, 1978 | Dover | United States | Elks Lodge | The Cramps |
| August 19, 1978 | Willimantic | United States | Shaboo Inn | —N/a |
| August 21, 1978 | New Haven | United States | Unknown venue | Shrapnel |
| August 26, 1978 | New Brunswick | United States | Red Fox Inn | The Bees; Sic Fox; The Instigators |
Europe
| September 5, 1978 | Helsinki | Finland | Työväentalo | —N/a |
| September 7, 1978 | Stockholm | Sweden | Domino | —N/a |
| September 8, 1978 | Malmö | Sweden | Dad's Dance Hall | —N/a |
| September 9, 1978 | Ronneby | Sweden | Club Ron | —N/a |
| September 11, 1978 | Hamburg | West Germany | Markthalle Hamburg | —N/a |
| September 12, 1978 | West Berlin | West Germany | Neue Welt | —N/a |
| September 14, 1978 | Brussels | Belgium | Theater 140 | The Werewolves |
| September 15, 1978 | Amsterdam | Netherlands | Paradiso | The Reducers |
| September 16, 1978 | Arnhem | Netherlands | Stokvishal | Space Speedtwins |
| September 18, 1978 | Paris | France | Le Batacan | The Lou's |
| September 23, 1978 | Belfast | Northern Ireland | Ulster Hall | Snips |
| September 24, 1978 | Dublin | Ireland | State Cinema | Snips |
| September 26, 1978 | Bristol | England | Locarno | Snips |
| September 28, 1978 | Newcastle | England | Newcastle City Hall | Snips |
| September 29, 1978 | Manchester | England | Free Trade Hall | Snips |
| September 30, 1978 | Birmingham | England | Birmingham Odeon | Snips |
| October 2, 1978 | London | England | Hammersmith Odeon | Snips |
| October 3, 1978 | Cardiff | Wales | Cardiff University | Snips |
| October 4, 1978 | Leeds | England | University of Leeds | Snips |
| October 5, 1978 | Coventry | England | University of Warwick | Snips |
| October 6, 1978 | Edinburgh | Scotland | University of Edinburgh | Snips |
| October 7, 1978 | Glasgow | Scotland | Queen Margaret Union | Snips |
North America
| October 19, 1978 | New Haven | United States | Toad's Place | —N/a |
| October 21, 1978 | New York City | United States | Queens College | —N/a |
| October 22, 1978 | Providence | United States | Walsh Gymnasium | Support act for: Patti Smith |
| October 23, 1978 | Philadelphia | United States | Walnut Street Theatre | Nick Gilder |
| October 25, 1978 | Rensselaer | United States | Hullabaloo | The Flashcubes |
| October 26, 1978 | Amherst | United States | University of Massachusetts Amherst | —N/a |
| October 27, 1978 | Washington, D.C | United States | Ontario Theater | —N/a |
| October 28, 1978 | Richmond | United States | Virginia Commonwealth University | Support act for: Foreigner |
North America
| November 12, 1978 | Raleigh | United States | The Pier | Th' Cigartez |
| November 13, 1978 | Atlanta | United States | Omni Coliseum | Support act for: Black Sabbath |
| November 15, 1978 | Highwood | United States | Minstrel's Alle | Tutu & The Pirates |
| November 17, 1978 | Omaha | United States | The Music Box | Charlie Burton and Rock Therapy |
| November 18, 1978 | Saint Paul | United States | St. Paul Civic Center | Support act for: Foreigner |
North America
| December 1, 1978 | San Bernardino | United States | Swing Auditorium | Support act for: Black Sabbath |
| December 2, 1978 | Stockton | United States | Conservatory of Music | —N/a |
| December 4, 1978 | Long Beach | United States | Long Beach Arena | Support act for: Black Sabbath |
| December 5, 1978 | Phoenix | United States | Arizona Veterans Memorial Coliseum | Support act for: Black Sabbath |
| December 14, 1978 | West Hollywood | United States | The Roxy (Filming for Rock 'n' Roll Highschool) | —N/a |
| December 15, 1978 | San Diego | United States | Montezuma Hall | The Penetrators |
| December 18, 1978 | Costa Mesa | United States | Cuckoo's Nest | —N/a |
| December 24, 1978 | West Hollywood | United States | Whisky a Go Go | —N/a |
| December 25, 1978 | West Hollywood | United States | Whisky a Go Go | —N/a |
| December 27, 1978 | West Hollywood | United States | Whisky a Go Go | Quiet Riot |
| December 28, 1978 | San Francisco | United States | Winterland Ballroom | Support act for: The Tubes |
| December 29, 1978 | Reno | United States | Washoe County Fairgrounds | Support act for: Eddie Money |
| December 30, 1978 | Santa Cruz | United States | Santa Cruz Civic Auditorium | Support act for: Rick Derringer |
| December 31, 1978 | San Jose | United States | San Jose Center for the Performing Arts | Support act for: The Tubes |

=== First setlist (Legs 1-2) ===
1. "Rockaway Beach"
2. "Teenage Lobotomy"
3. "Blitzkrieg Bop"
4. "I Wanna Be Well"
5. "Glad to See You Go"
6. "Gimme Gimme Shock Treatment"
7. "You're Gonna Kill That Girl"
8. "I Don't Care"
9. "Sheena Is a Punk Rocker"
10. "Havana Affair"
11. "Commando"
12. "Here Today, Gone Tomorrow"
13. "Surfin' Bird" (The Trashmen cover)
14. "Cretin Hop"
15. "Listen to My Heart"
16. "California Sun" (Joe Jones cover)
17. "I Don't Wanna Walk Around with You"
18. "Pinhead"

Encore:

19. "Do You Want to Dance" (Bobby Freeman cover)
20. "Chain Saw"
21. "Today Your Love, Tomorrow the World"

Encore 2:

22. "Now I Wanna Be a Good Boy"
23. "Suzy Is a Headbanger"
24. "Let's Dance" (Chris Montez cover)

Encore 3:

25. "Oh Oh I Love Her So"
26. "Now I Wanna Sniff Some Glue"
27. "We're a Happy Family"

=== Second setlist (Legs 3-4) ===
1. "Rockaway Beach"
2. "Teenage Lobotomy"
3. "Blitzkrieg Bop"
4. "I Don't Want You"
5. "Go Mental"
6. "Gimme Gimme Shock Treatment"
7. "You're Gonna Kill That Girl"
8. "Don't Come Close"
9. "I Don't Care"
10. "She's the One"
11. "Sheena Is a Punk Rocker"
12. "Havana Affair"
13. "Commando"
14. "Needles and Pins" (Jackie DeShannon cover)
15. "Surfin' Bird" (The Trashmen cover)
16. "Cretin Hop"
17. "Listen to My Heart"
18. "California Sun" (Joe Jones cover)
19. "I Don't Wanna Walk Around with You"
20. "Pinhead"

Encore:

21. "Do You Want to Dance" (Bobby Freeman cover)
22. "Oh Oh I Love Her So"
23. "Today Your Love, Tomorrow the World"

Encore 2:

24. "Judy Is a Punk"
25. "Now I Wanna Sniff Some Glue"
26. "We're a Happy Family"

=== Third setlist (Legs 5-7) ===
1. "Rockaway Beach"
2. "Teenage Lobotomy"
3. "Blitzkrieg Bop"
4. "I Don't Want You"
5. "Go Mental"
6. "Gimme Gimme Shock Treatment"
7. "You're Gonna Kill That Girl"
8. "Don't Come Close"
9. "I Just Want to Have Something to Do"
10. "Bad Brain"
11. "She's the One"
12. "Sheena Is a Punk Rocker"
13. "Havana Affair"
14. "Commando"
15. "Needles and Pins" (Jackie DeShannon cover)
16. "Surfin' Bird" (The Trashmen cover)
17. "Cretin Hop"
18. "Listen to My Heart"
19. "California Sun" (Joe Jones cover)
20. "I Don't Wanna Walk Around with You"
21. "Pinhead"

Encore:

1. "Do You Want to Dance" (Bobby Freeman cover)
2. "I Wanna Be Sedated"
3. "Today Your Love, Tomorrow the World"

Encore 2:

1. "Judy Is a Punk"
2. "Now I Wanna Sniff Some Glue"
3. "We're a Happy Family"

== 1979 ==
| Date | City | Country | Venue | Supporting act(s) |
North America
| January 3, 1979 | Portland | United States | Earth Tavern | Wipers |
| January 4, 1979 | Seattle | United States | Seattle Center Coliseum | |
| January 5, 1979 | Seattle | United States | Norway Center | The Enemy; The Stripes |
| January 6, 1979 | Vancouver | Canada | Commodore Ballroom | Pointed Sticks |
| January 9, 1979 | Boise | United States | Bill's 121 Club | |
| January 10, 1979 | Idaho Falls | United States | Sandy Downs | |
| January 11, 1979 | Salt Lake City | United States | Abbey Road | The Barney Fife Band; Spittin' Teeth |
| January 13, 1979 | Boulder | United States | Boulder Theater | |
| January 14, 1979 | Boulder | United States | Boulder Theater | |
| January 18, 1979 | Dallas | United States | The Palladium | Kenny & The Kasuals |
| January 19, 1979 | Austin | United States | Armadillo World Headquarters | The Skyscrapers |
| January 20, 1979 | San Antonio | United States | Randy's Rodeo | Overload |
| January 21, 1979 | Houston | United States | Dome Shadows | |
| January 23, 1979 | Lafayette | United States | Downtown Lafayette | |
| January 24, 1979 | Avondale | United States | Ole Man River's | The Normals |
| January 25, 1979 | Baton Rouge | United States | Unknown venue | |
| January 26, 1979 | Lake Charles | United States | Lake Charles Music | Support act for: Toto |
| January 28, 1979 | Nashville | United States | Exit/In | Marshall Chapman |
| January 29, 1979 | Birmingham | United States | Unknown venue | |
| January 30, 1979 | Atlanta | United States | Atlanta Civic Center | The Fans; The Nobz |
| January 31, 1979 | Raleigh | United States | The Pier | Th' Cigartez |
| February 2, 1979 | College Park | United States | Varsity Grill Backroom | —N/a |
| February 4, 1979 | Essex | United States | Seagull Inn | |
| February 6, 1979 | Toronto | Canada | El Mocambo | |
| February 7, 1979 | Toronto | Canada | University of Toronto | |
| February 8, 1979 | Clarence | United States | Stage One | The Romantics |
| February 10, 1979 | Passaic | United States | Capitol Theatre | Shrapnel; David Johansen |
| February 14, 1979 | Shelton | United States | Pinecrest Country Club | |
| February 15, 1979 | Sunderland | United States | The Rusty Nail | |
| February 16, 1979 | New Brunswick | United States | Rutgers University-New Brunswick | |
| February 17, 1979 | Providence | United States | Lupo's Heartbreak Hotel | |
| February 23, 1979 | Toledo | United States | Toledo Speedway | |
| February 24, 1979 | Chicago | United States | Aragon Ballroom | The Godz; Fabulous Poodles |
| February 25, 1979 | Grosse Pointe | United States | Punch And Judy Theater | The Romantics |
| February 26, 1979 | Ann Arbor | United States | Second Chance | The Romantics; Sonic's Rendezvous Band |
| February 27, 1979 | Cleveland | United States | Agora Theatre and Ballroom | The Romantics |
| February 28, 1979 | Cincinnati | United States | Bogart's | |
| March 1, 1979 | Columbus | United States | Columbus Bicentennial Pavilion | |
| March 3, 1979 | Boston | United States | Orpheum Theatre | Willie Alexander; David Johansen |
| March 4, 1979 | West Hartford | United States | Hard Rock Cafe | |
| March 6, 1979 | Pittsburgh | United States | The Decade | |
| March 7, 1979 | Pittsburgh | United States | The Decade | Eddie and the Otters |
| March 9, 1979 | New York City | United States | The Palladium | Fabulous Poodles |
| March 22, 1979 | West Orange | United States | Creation | |
| March 23, 1979 | Princeton | United States | Alexander Hall | |
| March 24, 1979 | Browns Mills | United States | Alexander's Sunset Inn | The Werewolves |
| March 25, 1979 | Asbury Park | United States | Fast Lane | |
| March 29, 1979 | Dover | United States | The Showplace | |
| March 30, 1979 | New York City | United States | Wollman Auditorium | |
| March 31, 1979 | Jamesburg | United States | Emmett's Inn | The Bees |
| April 6, 1979 | Roslyn | United States | My Father's Place | The Rattlers; The Young Adults |
| April 7, 1979 | Roslyn | United States | My Father's Place | The Rattlers; The Young Adults |
| April 8, 1979 | New Brunswick | United States | Red Fox Inn | Harlow |
| April 10, 1979 | New York City | United States | CBGB (Last CBGB show) | Shrapnel |
North America
| June 8, 1979 | San Francisco | United States | Civic Center Plaza | |
| June 16, 1979 | Dover | United States | The Showplace | |
| June 17, 1979 | New Haven | United States | Oxford Ale House | |
| June 19, 1979 | Amityville | United States | Unknown Venue | |
| June 21, 1979 | West Orange | United States | South Mountain Music Fair | |
| June 22, 1979 | Asbury Park | United States | Fast Lane | |
| June 23, 1979 | Browns Mills | United States | Alexander's Sunset Inn | Sylvain Sylvain; The Romantics |
| June 24, 1979 | Allentown | United States | The Showcase | |
| June 26, 1979 | New York City | United States | College of Staten Island | |
| June 27, 1979 | New York City | United States | The Factory | |
| June 29, 1979 | Boston | United States | Paradise Rock Club | Thrills |
| June 30, 1979 | Boston | United States | Paradise Rock Club | Thrills |
| July 2, 1979 | Toronto | Canada | Exhibition Stadium (Canadian World Music Festival) | —N/a |
| July 5, 1979 | Poughkeepsie | United States | Good Times Cafe | |
| July 6, 1979 | DeWitt | United States | Uncle Sam's | The Flashcubes |
| July 7, 1979 | Rochester | United States | Triangle Theatre | New Math |
| July 8, 1979 | Albany | United States | J.B. Scott's | |
| July 11, 1979 | Toronto | Canada | University of Toronto | |
| July 12, 1979 | Toronto | Canada | University of Toronto | |
| July 13, 1979 | Montreal | Canada | Le Pretzel Enchainé | |
| July 14, 1979 | Montreal | Canada | Le Pretzel Enchainé | |
| July 19, 1979 | Roslyn | United States | My Father's Place | |
| July 20, 1979 | Roslyn | United States | My Father's Place | |
| July 21, 1979 | Roslyn | United States | My Father's Place | |
| July 22, 1979 | Taunton | United States | Lafayette | |
| July 27, 1979 | Baltimore | United States | Martin's West | Razz |
| July 29, 1979 | Ocena City | United States | Inlet Lot | |
| July 30, 1979 | Virginia Beach | United States | Rogues Club in Virginia Beach | |
| July 31, 1979 | Raleigh | United States | The Pier | |
| August 3, 1979 | Hartford | United States | Stage West | |
| August 4, 1979 | New York City | United States | Prospect Park | |
| August 6, 1979 | New York City | United States | Wollman Skating Rink (Dr. Pepper Summer Music Festival) | —N/a |
| August 8, 1979 | Asbury Park | United States | Fast Lane | The Rattlers |
| August 9, 1979 | Dover | United States | The Showplace | |
| August 11, 1979 | Amityville | United States | Pastimes Pub | |
| August 12, 1979 | Amityville | United States | Pastimes Pub | |
| August 13, 1979 | Port Chester | United States | Capitol Theatre | |
North America
| September 11, 1979 | Albany | United States | J.B. Scott's | |
| September 14, 1979 | Port Chester | United States | Marty's | |
| September 15, 1979 | Port Chester | United States | Marty's | |
| September 18, 1979 | Wayne | United States | Wayne Firehouse | |
| September 22, 1979 | Cookstown | United States | Satellite Lounge | |
| September 27, 1979 | Brookville | United States | C.W. Post College | |
| September 28, 1979 | New York City | United States | Prospect Park | |
| September 29, 1979 | New York City | United States | Prospect Park | |
| September 30, 1979 | New Haven | United States | Toad's Place | |
| October 2, 1979 | Bergenfield | United States | Circus-Circus | |
| October 3, 1979 | Wayne | United States | Wayne Firehouse | |
| October 4, 1979 | West Orange | United States | National Guard Armory | |
| October 6, 1979 | Boston | United States | Paradise Rock Club | |
| October 7, 1979 | New York City | United States | Hotel Diplomat | |
| October 8, 1979 | New York City | United States | Colden Auditorium | The Laughing Dogs The A's |
| October 9, 1979 | Philadelphia | United States | Walnut Street Theatre | |
| October 11, 1979 | Dayton | United States | She Nightclub | |
| October 12, 1979 | Galesburg | United States | Knox College | |
| October 13, 1979 | Evanston | United States | Northwestern University | Clone |
| October 14, 1979 | Grand Rapids | United States | The Alibi (Alpine Ave. NW) | |
| October 15, 1979 | Schaumburg | United States | B.Ginnings | |
| October 17, 1979 | Marietta | United States | Ban Johnson Field House | Supporting act for: The Police |
| October 18, 1979 | Detroit | United States | Detroit Masonic Temple | Supporting act for: Joe Jackson |
| October 19, 1979 | Bolingbrook | United States | Old Chicago | |
| October 20, 1979 | Milwaukee | United States | Milwaukee Auditorium | |
| October 23, 1979 | Denver | United States | Rainbow Music Hall | The Transistors |
| October 26, 1979 | Davis | United States | The Coffee House | 20/20 |
| October 27, 1979 | Oakland | United States | Oakland Civic Auditorium | SVT; The Members; The Shirts |
| October 28, 1979 | Los Angeles | United States | Royce Hall | 20/20 |
| October 29, 1979 | Los Angeles | United States | Ackerman Hall | 20/20 |
| October 31, 1979 | San Diego | United States | Montezuma Hall | 20/20 |
| November 2, 1979 | Costa Mesa | United States | Cuckoo's Nest | Dred Scott |
| November 4, 1979 | Irvine | United States | University of California, Irvine | 20/20 |
| November 5, 1979 | Claremont | United States | Garrison Theater | Gary Myrick & the Figures |
| November 6, 1979 | Garden Grove | United States | Rendezvous | The Crowd |
| November 8, 1979 | Tucson | United States | University of Arizona Ballroom | The Pedestrians |
| November 9, 1979 | El Paso | United States | Old Buffalo | Teenage Popeye |
| November 11, 1979 | Lubbock | United States | The Rox | The Planets |
| November 13, 1979 | Austin | United States | Armadillo World Headquarters | The Skunks |
| November 14, 1979 | Dallas | United States | Wintergarden Ballroom | |
| November 16, 1979 | Houston | United States | The Palace | Legionaires Disease |
| November 18, 1979 | Avondale | United States | Ole Man River's | The Contenders |
| November 20, 1979 | Homewood | United States | Brothers Music Hall | |
| November 22, 1979 | Atlanta | United States | The Agora | Single Bullet Theory; The Restraints |
| November 23, 1979 | Nashville | United States | Exit/In | |
| November 24, 1979 | Memphis | United States | Poet's | |
| November 26, 1979 | St. Louis | United States | Checkerdome | |
| November 27, 1979 | Maidson | United States | Headliners | |
| November 28, 1979 | Minneapolis | United States | Uncle Sam's | The Hypstrz |
| November 30, 1979 | Milwaukee | United States | The Palms | |
| December 1, 1979 | Cincinnati | United States | Bogart's | The Romantics |
| December 4, 1979 | Ann Arbor | United States | Second Chance | Nikki and the Corvettes |
| December 5, 1979 | Bloomington | United States | Axis | The Gizmos |
| December 6, 1979 | Indianapolis | United States | The Vogue | Latex Novelties |
| December 8, 1979 | Carlisle | United States | Anita Tuvin Schlechter Auditorium | Appalachia |
| December 10, 1979 | Lowell | United States | Cumnock Hall | Human Sexual Response |
| December 11, 1979 | New Haven | United States | Great American Music Hall | |
| December 13, 1979 | West Islip | United States | Hammerheads | |
| December 21, 1979 | Hartford | United States | Stage West | David Johansen |
| December 28, 1979 | Dover | United States | The Showplace | Hooks |
| December 29, 1979 | Freeport | United States | Calderone Concert Hall | |
| December 31, 1979 | New York City | United States | The Palladium | Alda Reserve |

=== First setlist (Leg 1) ===
1. "Rockaway Beach"
2. "Teenage Lobotomy"
3. "Blitzkrieg Bop"
4. "I Don't Want You"
5. "Go Mental"
6. "Gimme Gimme Shock Treatment"
7. "Rock 'n' Roll High School"
8. "I Wanna Be Sedated"
9. "I Just Want to Have Something to Do"
10. "She's the One"
11. "I'm Against It"
12. "Sheena Is a Punk Rocker"
13. "Havana Affair"
14. "Commando"
15. "Needles and Pins" (Jackie DeShannon cover)
16. "I Want You Around" or "I'm Affected"
17. "Surfin' Bird" (The Trashmen cover)
18. "Cretin Hop"
19. "Listen to My Heart"
20. "California Sun" (Joe Jones cover)
21. "I Don't Wanna Walk Around with You"
22. "Today Your Love, Tomorrow the World"
23. "Pinhead"

Encore:

24. "Do You Want to Dance" (Bobby Freeman cover)
25. "Suzy Is a Headbanger"
26. "Let's Dance" (Chris Montez cover)

Encore 2:

27. "Judy Is a Punk"
28. "Now I Wanna Sniff Some Glue"
29. "We're a Happy Family"

=== Second setlist (Legs 2-3) ===
1. "Blitzkrieg Bop"
2. "Teenage Lobotomy"
3. "Rockaway Beach"
4. "I Don't Want You"
5. "Go Mental"
6. "Gimme Gimme Shock Treatment"
7. "Rock 'n' Roll High School"
8. "I Wanna Be Sedated"
9. "I Just Want to Have Something to Do"
10. "Bad Brain" or "She's the One"
11. "I'm Against It"
12. "Sheena Is a Punk Rocker"
13. "Havana Affair"
14. "Commando"
15. "Needles and Pins" (Jackie DeShannon cover)
16. "I Want You Around" or "I'm Affected"
17. "Surfin' Bird" (The Trashmen cover)
18. "Cretin Hop"
19. "All the Way"
20. "California Sun" (Joe Jones cover)
21. "I Don't Wanna Walk Around with You"
22. "Today Your Love, Tomorrow the World"
23. "Pinhead"

Encore:

24. "Do You Want to Dance" (Bobby Freeman cover)
25. "Suzy Is a Headbanger"
26. "Let's Dance" (Chris Montez cover)

Encore 2:

27. "Chinese Rock"
28. "Beat on the Brat"
29. "We're a Happy Family"

== 1980 ==
| Date | City | Country | Venue | Supporting act(s) |
North America
| January 6, 1980 | Port Chester | United States | 21 North Dance Club | |
Europe
| January 16, 1980 | Brighton | England | Top Rank Suite | The Boys |
| January 17, 1980 | Leicester | England | Polytechnic - Scraptoft Campus | The Boys |
| January 18, 1980 | Cambridge | England | Cambridge Corn Exchange | The Boys |
| January 19, 1980 | Norwich | England | University of East Anglia | The Boys |
| January 21, 1980 | Exeter | England | University of Exeter | The Boys |
| January 22, 1980 | Cardiff | Wales | Cardiff University | The Boys |
| January 23, 1980 | Aylesbury | England | Maxwell Hall | The Boys |
| January 24, 1980 | Portsmouth | England | Portsmouth Guildhall | The Boys |
| January 26, 1980 | Leeds | England | University of Leeds | The Boys |
| January 27, 1980 | Edinburgh | Scotland | Odeon Theatre | The Boys |
| January 28, 1980 | Glasgow | Scotland | Apollo Theatre | The Boys |
| January 29, 1980 | Newcastle | England | Newcastle City Hall | The Boys |
| February 1, 1980 | Manchester | England | Manchester Apollo | The Boys |
| February 2, 1980 | Lancaster | England | University of Lancaster | The Boys |
| February 3, 1980 | Sheffield | England | Top Rank Suite | The Boys |
| February 4, 1980 | Birmingham | England | Birmingham Odeon | The Boys |
| February 6, 1980 | Bournemouth | England | Stateside Centre | The Boys |
| February 7, 1980 | Bristol | England | Colston Hall | The Boys |
| February 8, 1980 | Colchester | England | University of Essex | The Boys |
| February 9, 1980 | London | England | Rainbow Theatre | The Boys |
| February 11, 1980 | Amsterdam | Netherlands | Paradiso Grote Zaal | U.K. Subs |
| February 12, 1980 | Brussels | Belgium | Ancienne Belgique | U.K. Subs |
| February 14, 1980 | Reggio Emilia | Italy | Palazzetto dello Sport | U.K. Subs |
| February 15, 1980 | Udine | Italy | Palasport Primo Carnera | U.K. Subs |
| February 16, 1980 | Milan | Italy | PalaLido | U.K. Subs |
| February 18, 1980 | Turin | Italy | PalaRuffini | U.K. Subs |
| February 20, 1980 | Paris | France | Le Palace | U.K. Subs |
| February 22, 1980 | London | England | Electric Ballroom | The Boys |
| February 23, 1980 | London | England | Electric Ballroom | The Boys |
North America
| March 6, 1980 | Asbury Park | United States | The Fast Lane | |
| March 7, 1980 | Cherry Hill | United States | Emerald City | The Necessaries |
| March 8, 1980 | Cherry Hill | United States | Emerald City | The Necessaries |
| March 21, 1980 | Toronto | Canada | Danforth Music Hall | |
| March 22, 1980 | Toronto | Canada | Danforth Music Hall | |
| March 23, 1980 | Detroit | United States | Motor City Roller Rink | Heaven 17 |
| March 24, 1980 | Cleveland | United States | Agora | |
| March 26, 1980 | Columbus | United States | Agora Ballroom | |
| March 28, 1980 | Atlanta | United States | The Agora | Mouth-to-Mouth |
| March 29, 1980 | Atlanta | United States | The Agora | Deacon Little Band |
| March 30, 1980 | Gainesville | United States | Florida Gymnasium | |
| March 31, 1980 | Homewood | United States | Brothers Music Hall | |
| April 1, 1980 | Avondale | United States | Ole Man River's | |
| April 3, 1980 | Austin | United States | Armadillo World Headquarters | The Explosives |
| April 4, 1980 | Houston | United States | Cullen Performance Hall | |
| April 5, 1980 | Dallas | United States | Wintergarden Ballroom | The Romantics |
| April 7, 1980 | Tempe | United States | Dooley's | |
| April 8, 1980 | San Diego | United States | Montezuma Hall | |
| April 10, 1980 | Los Angeles | United States | Hollywood Palladium | Cindy Bullens |
| April 11, 1980 | Santa Cruz | United States | Santa Cruz Civic Auditorium | |
| April 12, 1980 | San Francisco | United States | Warfield Theatre | No Sisters |
| April 15, 1980 | Berkeley | United States | Pauley Ballroom | The Plastics |
| April 17, 1980 | Seattle | United States | The Showbox | The Dishrags |
| April 18, 1980 | Seattle | United States | The Showbox | The Dishrags |
| April 21, 1980 | Vancouver | Canada | Commodore Ballroom | |
| April 22, 1980 | Vancouver | Canada | University of British Columbia | |
| April 24, 1980 | Poctello | United States | ASISU Minidome | |
| April 26, 1980 | Boulder | United States | Glenn Miller Ballroom | |
| April 27, 1980 | Denver | United States | Rainbow Music Hall | |
| April 29, 1980 | Omaha | United States | Omaha Civic Auditorium | Skuddur |
| May 1, 1980 | DeKalb | United States | Carl Sandburg Auditorium | |
| May 2, 1980 | Champaign | United States | Unknown venue | |
| May 3, 1980 | East Lansing | United States | Jenison Fieldhouse (8-A-Day-For-The-80's Festival) | |
| May 4, 1980 | Chicago | United States | Ida Noyes Hall | |
| May 6, 1980 | Carbondale | United States | Southern Illinois University | |
| May 8, 1980 | Milwaukee | United States | The Palms | |
| May 9, 1980 | Glen Ellyn | United States | College of DuPage | |
| May 10, 1980 | Grinnell | United States | Darby Gym | |
| May 11, 1980 | Minneapolis | United States | Uncle Sam's | |
| May 13, 1980 | Chicago | United States | Park West | |
| May 14, 1980 | Chicago | United States | Park West | |
| May 15, 1980 | Chicago | United States | Park West | |
| May 16, 1980 | Schaumburg | United States | B.Ginnings | |
| May 17, 1980 | Chicago | United States | University of Illinois at Chicago Circle | |
| May 20, 1980 | London | Canada | Centennial Hall | The Demics |
| May 21, 1980 | Burlington | Canada | Centennial Arena | Forgotten Rebels |
| May 23, 1980 | Montreal | Canada | Auditorium le Plateau | Lucien Francœur |
| May 25, 1980 | Toronto | Canada | Club Kingsway | |
| May 26, 1980 | Guelph | Canada | University of Guelph | |
| May 27, 1980 | Ottawa | Canada | Civic Centre Salons | B. B. Gabor |
| May 29, 1980 | Albany | United States | Unknown venue | |
| May 30, 1980 | West Harford | United States | Stage West | Robin Lane & the Chartbusters |
| May 31, 1980 | Lynn | United States | Main Act Concert Club | |
| June 2, 1980 | Boston | United States | Paradise Rock Club | The Spectres |
| June 3, 1980 | Boston | United States | Paradise Rock Club | The Spectres |
| June 4, 1980 | Boston | United States | Paradise Rock Club | The Spectres |
| June 5, 1980 | New York City | United States | The Factory | |
| June 6, 1980 | Jackson | United States | Six Flags Great Adventure | |
| June 8, 1980 | College Park | United States | UMD Student Union Grand Ballroom | The Slickee Boys |
| June 10, 1980 | Tampa | United States | The Agora | |
| June 11, 1980 | Hallandale Beach | United States | Agora Ballroom | The Reactions |
| June 12, 1980 | Hallandale Beach | United States | Agora Ballroom | The Cichlids |
| June 15, 1980 | New York City | United States | Club 57 | |
Asia
| June 27, 1980 | Tokyo | Japan | Seibu Gekijou (Two shows each date) | Co-headlining with: Sheena & The Rokkets |
| June 28, 1980 | Tokyo | Japan | Seibu Gekijou (Two shows each date) | Co-headlining with: Sheena & The Rokkets |
| June 29, 1980 | Tokyo | Japan | Seibu Gekijou (Two shows each date) | Co-headlining with: Sheena & The Rokkets |
| July 1, 1980 | Nagoya | Japan | Unryu Hall | |
| July 2, 1980 | Kyoto | Japan | Kyoto Kaikan (Two shows) | Inu (7:30pm show); Zigzag (9:30pm show) |
| July 3, 1980 | Osaka | Japan | Studio Ahiru (Two shows) | ZigZag |
| July 4, 1980 | Fukuoka | Japan | Daihakata Hall | |
Oceania
| July 8, 1980 | Sydney | Australia | Capitol Theatre | La Femme |
| July 9, 1980 | Sydney | Australia | Capitol Theatre | La Femme |
| July 10, 1980 | Melbourne | Australia | La Trobe University | INXS |
| July 11, 1980 | Adelaide | Australia | Thebarton Town Hall | |
| July 13, 1980 | Wollongong | Australia | Wollongong Leagues Club | Matt Finish |
| July 14, 1980 | Sydney | Australia | Sundowner Hotel | |
| July 15, 1980 | Sydney | Australia | Chequers | Models; Dee Minor and The Dischords |
| July 16, 1980 | Canberra | Australia | The Hellenic Club | Models |
| July 18, 1980 | Brisbane | Australia | Brisbane Festival Hall | Midnight Oil; The Lemmings |
| July 19, 1980 | Gold Coast | Australia | The Playroom | |
| July 21, 1980 | Auckland | New Zealand | Logan Campbell Centre | |
| July 22, 1980 | Wellington | New Zealand | Winter Show Buildings | |
| July 24, 1980 | Christchurch | New Zealand | Christchurch Town Hall | |
North America
| August 7, 1980 | Long Branch | United States | Unknown venue | |
| August 8, 1980 | Asbury Park | United States | Paramount Theatre | The Rattlers |
| August 9, 1980 | Nantasket Beach | United States | Uncle Sam's | |
| August 10, 1980 | Cherry Hill | United States | Emerald City | |
| August 11, 1980 | New York City | United States | Wollman Rink (Dr. Pepper Summer Music Festival) | —N/a |
Europe
| August 24, 1980 | Edinburgh | Scotland | Playhouse | |
| August 28, 1980 | Stockholm | Sweden | Göta Lejon | |
| August 30, 1980 | Oslo | Norway | Chateau Neuf | |
| August 31, 1980 | Lund | Sweden | Olympen | |
| September 1, 1980 | Copenhagen | Denmark | Odd Fellow Palæet | |
| September 3, 1980 | West Berlin | West Germany | Metropol | |
| September 4, 1980 | Wiesbaden | West Germany | Wartburg Music Hall | |
| September 6, 1980 | Avelgem | Belgium | Tent aan Station | |
| September 7, 1980 | Rotterdam | Netherlands | Zuiderpark Stadion (Rotterdam New Pop) | |
| September 8, 1980 | Munich | West Germany | Schwabinger Bräu | |
| September 9, 1980 | Zürich | Switzerland | Volkshaus | The Ticket |
| September 11, 1980 | Sanremo | Italy | Parco delle Carmelitane | |
| September 12, 1980 | Genoa | Italy | Palazzo dello Sport | |
| September 13, 1980 | Milan | Italy | Velodromo Vigorelli | |
| September 14, 1980 | Rome | Italy | Parco della Mole Adriana | |
| September 15, 1980 | Casalmaggiore | Italy | Palasport | |
| September 17, 1980 | Montpellier | France | Grand Odeon | Ici Paris |
| September 19, 1980 | Barcelona | Spain | Montjuïc | Supporting act for: Mike Oldfield |
| September 22, 1980 | Porto | Portugal | Pavilion Infante Sagres | |
| September 23, 1980 | Cascais | Portugal | Cascais Drama and Sport Group Pavilion | |
| September 24, 1980 | Cascais | Portugal | Cascais Drama and Sport Group Pavilion | |
| September 26, 1980 | Madrid | Spain | Plaza de Toros de Vista Alegre | Nacha Pop |
| September 27, 1980 | San Sebastián | Spain | Velódromo de Anoeta | |
| September 29, 1980 | Lyon | France | Palais d'Hiver | |
| September 30, 1980 | Paris | France | Le Bataclan | |
| October 2, 1980 | London | England | Hammersmith Odeon | The Specters |
| October 3, 1980 | Derby | England | Assembly Rooms | |
| October 4, 1980 | Manchester | England | Manchester Apollo | The Specters |
| October 5, 1980 | Edinburgh | Scotland | Edinburgh Playhouse | The Specters; The Exploited |
| October 6, 1980 | Liverpool | England | The Rotter's Club | The Specters |
| October 8, 1980 | Dublin | Ireland | Grand Cinema | The Specters |
| October 9, 1980 | Belfast | Northern Ireland | Ulster Hall | The Specters |
| October 11, 1980 | Birmingham | England | Birmingham Odeon | The Specters |
| October 12, 1980 | Canterbury | England | Canterbury Odeon | The Specters |
North America
| December 26, 1980 | Cherry Hill | United States | Emerald City | |
| December 27, 1980 | New York City | United States | Paramount Theatre | |
| December 29, 1980 | Dover | United States | The Showplace | Jitterz |
| December 31, 1980 | Lido Beach | United States | Malibu Night Club | |

=== Typical setlist ===
1. "Blitzkrieg Bop"
2. "Teenage Lobotomy"
3. "Rockaway Beach"
4. "I Can't Make It on Time" (Replaced "I Don't Want You after Leg 2)
5. "Go Mental"
6. "Gimme Gimme Shock Treatment"
7. "Rock 'n' Roll High School"
8. "I Wanna Be Sedated"
9. "Do You Remember Rock 'n' Roll Radio?"
10. "She's the One" or "Now I Wanna Sniff Some Glue"
11. "I Just Want to Have Something to Do" or "I'm Against It"
12. "Sheena Is a Punk Rocker"
13. "Let's Go" or "This Ain't Havana"
14. "Commando"
15. "Here Today, Gone Tomorrow" or "I Wanna Be Your Boyfriend"
16. "I'm Affected"
17. "Surfin' Bird" (The Trashmen cover)
18. "Cretin Hop"
19. "All the Way"
20. "Judy Is a Punk"
21. "California Sun" (Joe Jones cover)
22. "I Don't Wanna Walk Around with You"
23. "Today Your Love, Tomorrow the World"
24. "Pinhead"

Encore:

25. "Do You Want to Dance" (Bobby Freeman cover)
26. "Suzy Is a Headbanger"
27. "Let's Dance" (Chris Montez cover)

Encore 2:

28. "Chinese Rock"
29. "Beat on the Brat"
30. "We're a Happy Family"

== 1981 ==
| Date | City | Country | Venue | Opening act(s) |
North America
| January 3, 1981 | New York City | United States | Walt Whitman Auditorium | —N/a |
| January 4, 1981 | New York City | United States | Rockaway | —N/a |
| January 6, 1981 | Boston | United States | 15 Landsdowne Street | —N/a |
| January 7, 1981 | Providence | United States | Lupo's Heartbreak Hotel | The Taxi Boys |
| January 8, 1981 | West Hartford | United States | Stage West | The Fast |
North America
| February 13, 1981 | Philadelphia | United States | Irvine Auditorium | —N/a |
| February 14, 1981 | Stony Brook | United States | Stony Brook Gymnasium | —N/a |
| February 16, 1981 | New Paltz | United States | State University of New York at New Paltz | Blotto |
| February 19, 1981 | New York City | United States | Bond International Casino | —N/a |
| February 20, 1981 | New York City | United States | Bond International Casino | —N/a |
| February 21, 1981 | New Brunswick | United States | College Avenue Gymnasium | Blue Angel |
| February 27, 1981 | South Orange | United States | Seton Hall University | Blue Angel |
| February 28, 1981 | Ithaca | United States | Bailey Hall | The Symbols |
North America
| July 3, 1981 | Hampton Beach | United States | Hampton Beach Casino Ballroom | The Stompers |
| July 4, 1981 | Hampton Beach | United States | Hampton Beach Casino Ballroom | The Stompers |
| July 5, 1981 | Hull | United States | Uncle Sam's | —N/a |
| July 7, 1981 | Passaic | United States | Hitsville | —N/a |
| July 9, 1981 | Lido Beach | United States | Malibu Night Club | —N/a |
| July 10, 1981 | New York City | United States | The Palladium | Stiv Bators |
| July 12, 1981 | New York City | United States | Paramount Theatre | —N/a |
| July 13, 1981 | Wildwood | United States | The Playpen | Magnum |
| July 14, 1981 | College Park | United States | Ritchie Coliseum | Black Market Baby |
| July 15, 1981 | West Islip | United States | Hammerheads | —N/a |
| July 17, 1981 | New York City | United States | The Palladium | —N/a |
| July 18, 1981 | Rochelle Park | United States | The Hole in the Wall | —N/a |
| July 23, 1981 | Tampa | United States | Tampa Theatre | The Bobs |
| July 24, 1981 | Gainesville | United States | Great Southern Music Hall | The Cichlids |
| July 26, 1981 | Hallandale Beach | United States | Agora Ballroom | Holly and the Italians |
| July 27, 1981 | Hallandale Beach | United States | Agora Ballroom | Holly and the Italians |
| July 28, 1981 | Hallandale Beach | United States | Agora Ballroom | Holly and the Italians |
| July 29, 1981 | Orlando | United States | Park Avenue Club | Holly and the Italians |
| July 31, 1981 | Atlanta | United States | The Agora | Holly and the Italians |
| August 1, 1981 | Atlanta | United States | The Agora | Holly and the Italians |
| August 4, 1981 | Dallas | United States | Agora Ballroom (Two shows) | Holly and the Italians |
| August 5, 1981 | Houston | United States | Agora Ballroom | —N/a |
| August 6, 1981 | San Antonio | United States | Randy's Rodeo | —N/a |
| August 7, 1981 | Austin | United States | Austin Opry House | Holly and the Italians |
| August 9, 1981 | Denver | United States | Rainbow Music Hall | Gulons |
| August 12, 1981 | Phoenix | United States | Arizona Veterans Memorial Coliseum | Opening act for: The Kinks |
| August 13, 1981 | San Diego | United States | California Theatre | The Penetrators |
| August 14, 1981 | Los Angeles | United States | Hollywood Palladium | Holly and the Italians |
| August 15, 1981 | Pasadena | United States | Perkins Palace | Holly and the Italians |
| August 18, 1981 | San Francisco | United States | Dreamland | Red Rockers |
| August 19, 1981 | Petaluma | United States | Phoenix Theatre | The Victims Jo Allen and the Shapes |
| August 20, 1981 | Santa Cruz | United States | Santa Cruz Civic Auditorium | The Mutants; The Batteries |
| August 21, 1981 | San Francisco | United States | Warfield Theatre | —N/a |
| August 27, 1981 | East Islip | United States | Club 2001 | —N/a |
| August 29, 1981 | New York City | United States | Pier 84 | —N/a |
| September 3, 1981 | Albany | United States | Unknown venue | —N/a |
| September 4, 1981 | Vestal | United States | State University of New York at Binghamton | —N/a |
| September 5, 1981 | Saratoga Springs | United States | Unknown venue | —N/a |
| September 9, 1981 | Mount Vernon | United States | The Left Bank | —N/a |
| September 11, 1981 | West Hartford | United States | Stage West | Shrapnel |
| September 12, 1981 | Cherry Hill | United States | Emerald City | Holly and the Italians; Bow Wow Wow |
| September 13, 1981 | New Haven | United States | New Haven Agora | —N/a |
| September 14, 1981 | Providence | United States | Lupo's Heartbreak Hotel | —N/a |
| September 15, 1981 | Boston | United States | The Metro (Two shows) | —N/a |
| September 17, 1981 | Rochester | United States | Triangle Theatre | —N/a |
| September 18, 1981 | Toronto | Canada | The Concert Hall | —N/a |
| September 19, 1981 | Detroit | United States | Nitro Rock Club | —N/a |
| September 20, 1981 | Detroit | United States | Nitro Rock Club | —N/a |
| September 22, 1981 | Cleveland | United States | Agora Theatre and Ballroom | The Wild Giraffes |
| September 24, 1981 | Bloomington | United States | Indiana University Auditorium | —N/a |
| September 25, 1981 | Chicago | United States | Unknown venue | —N/a |
| September 26, 1981 | Twin Lakes | United States | Edgewater Ballroom | —N/a |
| September 28, 1981 | Minneapolis | United States | First Avenue | —N/a |
| September 29, 1981 | Madison | United States | Headliners | The Republicans |
| October 1, 1981 | Urbana | United States | Foellinger Auditorium | —N/a |
| October 2, 1981 | Chicago | United States | Holiday Ballroom | —N/a |
| October 3, 1981 | Chicago | United States | Holiday Ballroom | —N/a |
| October 4, 1981 | Youngstown | United States | Youngstown Agora | Nikki and the Corvettes |
| October 5, 1981 | Ann Arbor | United States | Second Chance | The Cult Heroes |
| October 7, 1981 | Dayton | United States | She Nightclub | |
| October 8, 1981 | Columbus | United States | Agora Ballroom | The Fast |
| ~~October 10, 1981~~ | Virginia Beach | United States | Peabody's | |
| October 11, 1981 | Washington, D.C. | United States | Warner Theatre | |
Europe
| October 22, 1981 | London | England | Hammersmith Palais | Téléphone; Siam |
| October 24, 1981 | Amsterdam | Netherlands | Paradiso Grote Zaal | —N/a |
| October 26, 1981 | Stockholm | Sweden | Måndagsbörsen | —N/a |
| October 27, 1981 | Stockholm | Sweden | Göta Lejon | —N/a |
| October 28, 1981 | Lund | Sweden | Olympen | —N/a |
| October 29, 1981 | Copenhagen | Denmark | Odd Fellow Palæet | —N/a |
| November 1, 1981 | Aachen | West Germany | Eurogress | —N/a |
| November 2, 1981 | Hanover | West Germany | Rotation | —N/a |
| November 4, 1981 | Munich | West Germany | Schwabinger Bräu | —N/a |
| November 6, 1981 | Milan | Italy | Rolling Stone (Two shows) | —N/a |
| November 7, 1981 | Bordeaux | France | Salle des Fêtes du Grand Parc | —N/a |
| November 9, 1981 | Barcelona | Spain | Juventud de Badalona | Los Secretos |
| November 10, 1981 | Valencia | Spain | Bony Torrente | |
| November 11, 1981 | Madrid | Spain | Pabellón de la Ciudad Deportiva del Real Madrid | Los Rebeldes |
| November 12, 1981 | Madrid | Spain | Pabellón de la Ciudad Deportiva del Real Madrid | Los Rebeldes |
| November 13, 1981 | A Coruña | Spain | Pazo dos Deportes De Riazor | Los Suaves |
| November 15, 1981 | San Sebastián | Spain | Velódromo de Anoeta | Unknown support |
| November 17, 1981 | Paris | France | Théâtre Le Palace | Les Intouchables |
| November 18, 1981 | Brussels | Belgium | Ancienne Belgique | |
| November 19, 1981 | London | England | The Venue | James Blood Ulmer; The Higsons |
North America
| December 26, 1981 | Trenton | United States | City Gardens | —N/a |
| December 31, 1981 | Lido Beach | United States | Malibu Night Club | —N/a |

=== First setlist (Legs 1-2) ===
1. "Do You Remember Rock 'n' Roll Radio?"
2. "Do You Want to Dance" (Bobby Freeman cover)
3. "Blitzkrieg Bop"
4. "I Can't Make It on Time"
5. "Go Mental"
6. "Gimme Gimme Shock Treatment"
7. "Rock 'n' Roll High School"
8. "I Wanna Be Sedated"
9. "Beat on the Brat"
10. "Now I Wanna Sniff Some Glue"
11. "I Just Want to Have Something to Do"
12. "Sheena Is a Punk Rocker"
13. "You Sound Like You're Sick"
14. "Commando"
15. "Here Today, Gone Tomorrow"
16. "I'm Affected"
17. "Rockaway Beach"
18. "Teenage Lobotomy"
19. "Surfin' Bird" (The Trashmen cover)
20. "Cretin Hop"
21. "Oh Oh I Love Her So"
22. "California Sun" (Joe Jones cover)
23. "Today Your Love, Tomorrow the World"
24. "Pinhead"

Encore:

25. "Chinese Rock"
26. "Suzy Is a Headbanger"
27. "Let's Dance" (Chris Montez cover)

Encore 2:

28. "The KKK Took My Baby Away"
29. "I Don't Wanna Walk Around with You"
30. "We're a Happy Family"

=== Second setlist (Legs 3-5) ===
1. "Do You Remember Rock 'n' Roll Radio?"
2. "Do You Want to Dance" (Bobby Freeman cover)
3. "Blitzkrieg Bop"
4. "This Business Is Killing Me"
5. "All's Quiet on the Eastern Front"
6. "Gimme Gimme Shock Treatment"
7. "Rock 'n' Roll High School"
8. "I Wanna Be Sedated"
9. "Beat on the Brat"
10. "The KKK Took My Baby Away"
11. "Go Mental" or "Now I Wanna Sniff Some Glue"
12. "You Sound Like You're Sick"
13. "Suzy Is a Headbanger"
14. "Let's Dance" (Chris Montez cover)
15. "Here Today, Gone Tomorrow"
16. "I'm Affected"
17. "Chinese Rock"
18. "Rockaway Beach"
19. "Teenage Lobotomy"
20. "Surfin' Bird" (The Trashmen cover)
21. "Cretin Hop"
22. "California Sun" (Joe Jones cover)
23. "Today Your Love, Tomorrow the World"
24. "Pinhead"

Encore:

25. "Come on Now" or "She's a Sensation"
26. "I Don't Wanna Walk Around with You"
27. "Sheena Is a Punk Rocker"

Encore 2:

28. "We Want the Airwaves"
29. "I Just Want to Have Something to Do"
30. "We're a Happy Family"

== 1982 ==
| Date | City | Country | Venue | Supporting act(s) |
North America
| January 2, 1982 | Hull | United States | Uncle Sam's | |
| January 3, 1982 | New Haven | United States | New Haven Agora | The Roll-ons |
| January 7, 1982 | Passaic | United States | Hitsville | |
| January 8, 1982 | Pawcatuck | United States | Showcase South | |
| January 9, 1982 | New York City | United States | St. George Theatre | |
| January 22, 1982 | Glen Cove | United States | Northstage Theater | Jo Marshall |
North America
| February 11, 1982 | Boston | United States | The Metro | |
| February 12, 1982 | Delhi | United States | State University of New York at Delhi | |
| February 13, 1982 | Manchester | United States | New Hampshire College | |
| February 18, 1982 | Newark | United States | University of Delaware | |
| February 19, 1982 | Fairfield | United States | Fairfield University | |
| February 20, 1982 | Providence | United States | The Living Room | |
| February 21, 1982 | Oswego | United States | Laker Hall Gym | |
| March 1, 1982 | Baltimore | United States | Shriver Hall Auditorium | Null Ø Set |
| March 6, 1982 | West Islip | United States | Hammerheads | |
| March 13, 1982 | Buffalo | United States | Clark Gym | |
| March 16, 1982 | Cleveland | United States | Agora | |
| March 17, 1982 | Detroit | United States | Grand Circus Theater | Kix |
| March 25, 1982 | Albany | United States | J.B. Scott's | |
| March 26, 1982 | Bear Mountain | United States | The River Room Lounge | |
| March 27, 1982 | Mansfield | United States | Straughn Hall | |
| April 3, 1982 | Maidson | United States | Drew University | |
| April 4, 1982 | Framingham | United States | Dwight Hall | |
| April 14, 1982 | New York City | United States | Wollman Auditorium | |
| April 16, 1982 | Millersville | United States | Millersville State College Gym | David Johansen |
| April 17, 1982 | Mahwah | United States | Ramapo College | David Johansen |
| April 18, 1982 | Saratoga Springs | United States | Skidmore College | The Verge |
| April 21, 1982 | Montclair | United States | Montclair State College | David Johansen |
| April 22, 1982 | Salem | United States | Salem State College | The Neighborhoods |
| April 23, 1982 | Cambridge | United States | MIT New Athletic Center | The Peter Dayton Band; The Neats |
| April 24, 1982 | Waltham | United States | Shaprio Gymnasium | David Johansen |
| April 25, 1982 | Glassboro | United States | Esbjornson Gymnasium | |
| April 27, 1982 | Virginia Beach | United States | Rogues Gallery | |
| April 28, 1982 | Columbia | United States | Russell House Ballroom | Rhythm of Discipline |
| April 29, 1982 | Morgantown | United States | West Virginia University | Unknown support |
| April 30, 1982 | New Rochelle | United States | Iona College | |
| May 1, 1982 | Hempstead | United States | Hofstra University | |
| May 2, 1982 | Newark | United States | New Jersey Institute of Technology | David Johansen |
| May 6, 1982 | Fitchburg | United States | Fitchburg State College Weston Auditorium | |
| May 7, 1982 | Hull | United States | Uncle Sam's | |
| May 8, 1982 | Farmington | United States | Unknown venue | |
| May 9, 1982 | Hampton Beach | United States | Club Casino | The Neighborhoods |
| May 14, 1982 | Ewing | United States | Trenton State College | |
| May 16, 1982 | Burlington | United States | University of Vermont | David Johansen |
| May 18, 1982 | Jersey City | United States | Margaret Williams Theatre | Robert Gordon |
| May 20, 1982 | Poughkeepsie | United States | The Chance | |
| May 21, 1982 | Poughkeepsie | United States | The Chance | |
| May 22, 1982 | New York City | United States | Brooklyn College | |
| May 29, 1982 | Schenectady | United States | West Beach (Camp Union Barbecue) | —N/a |
| May 30, 1982 | Tyngsborough | United States | Thunderbird Country Club (Spring Fest) | —N/a |
North America
| July 2, 1982 | Dover | United States | The Showplace | |
North America
| July 20, 1982 | Roslyn | United States | My Father's Place | |
North America
| August 24, 1982 | New York City | United States | L'Amour | |
| August 25, 1982 | Poughkeepsie | United States | The Chance | |
| August 27, 1982 | Asbury Park | United States | Fast Lane | |
| August 28, 1982 | Hampton Beach | United States | Unknown venue | |
| August 29, 1982 | East Hampton | United States | Unknown venue | |
| September 3, 1982 | San Bernardino | United States | Glen Helen Regional Park (US Festival) | —N/a |
North America
| October 1, 1982 | Providence | United States | The Living Room | |
| October 3, 1982 | Washington, D.C. | United States | Wax Museum Nightclub | |
| October 4, 1982 | Virginia Beach | United States | Rogues Gallery | |
| October 6, 1982 | New Haven | United States | New Haven Agora | |
| October 7, 1982 | West Hartford | United States | West Hartford Agora | The Del-Lords |
North America
| November 15, 1982 | Bangor | United States | Bangor Auditorium | Opening act for: Cheap Trick |
| November 16, 1982 | Boston | United States | The Channel | The Real Kids; Annoyed |
| November 20, 1982 | Mount Vernon | United States | The Left Bank | The Rattlers |
| November 21, 1982 | Hempstead | United States | Hofstra University | Opening act for: The B-52's |
| ~~November 24, 1982~~ | Ottawa | Canada | Barrymore's | Bugs Harvey Oswald; Screaming Bamboo |
| November 26, 1982 | West Islip | United States | Hammerheads | |
| November 27, 1982 | West Islip | United States | Hammerheads | |

=== Typical setlist ===
1. "Do You Remember Rock 'n' Roll Radio?"
2. "Do You Want to Dance" (Bobby Freeman cover)
3. "Blitzkrieg Bop"
4. "This Business Is Killing Me"
5. "All's Quiet on the Eastern Front"
6. "Gimme Gimme Shock Treatment"
7. "Rock 'n' Roll High School"
8. "I Wanna Be Sedated"
9. "Beat on the Brat"
10. "The KKK Took My Baby Away"
11. "Go Mental" or "Now I Wanna Sniff Some Glue"
12. "You Sound Like You're Sick"
13. "Suzy Is a Headbanger"
14. "Let's Dance" (Chris Montez cover)
15. "Here Today, Gone Tomorrow"
16. "I'm Affected"
17. "Chinese Rock"
18. "Rockaway Beach"
19. "Teenage Lobotomy"
20. "Surfin' Bird" (The Trashmen cover)
21. "Cretin Hop"
22. "California Sun" (Joe Jones cover)
23. "Today Your Love, Tomorrow the World"
24. "Pinhead"

Encore:

25. "Come on Now" or "She's a Sensation"
26. "I Don't Wanna Walk Around with You"
27. "Sheena Is a Punk Rocker"

Encore 2:

28. "We Want the Airwaves"
29. "I Just Want to Have Something to Do"
30. "We're a Happy Family"

== 1983 ==
| Date | City | Country | Venue | Opening act(s) |
North America
| February 13, 1983 | Utica | United States | Mohawk Valley Community College (Richie's first show) | The Nitecaps |
| February 17, 1983 | Philadelphia | United States | Drexel University | |
| February 18, 1983 | Poughkeepsie | United States | The Chance | Manikenz |
| February 19, 1983 | Wellesley | United States | Unknown venue | |
| February 20, 1983 | Boston | United States | Boston University | |
| February 24, 1983 | Middlebury | United States | Pepin Gymnasium | The Stompers |
North America
| March 12, 1983 | Southampton | United States | Southampton College Gym | |
| March 13, 1983 | Danbury | United States | Western Connecticut State University | |
| March 14, 1983 | Burlington | United States | Flynn Center for the Performing Arts | The Decentz |
| March 16, 1983 | Philadelphia | United States | Ripley's Music Hall | |
| March 17, 1983 | Philadelphia | United States | Ripley's Music Hall | |
| March 18, 1983 | New York City | United States | The Brooklyn Zoo | |
| March 19, 1983 | New York City | United States | The Brooklyn Zoo | |
| March 23, 1983 | Washington, D.C. | United States | Wax Museum Nightclub | |
| March 24, 1983 | Washington, D.C. | United States | Wax Museum Nightclub | |
| March 25, 1983 | New Haven | United States | New Haven Agora | Single Bullet Theory |
| March 26, 1983 | West Hartford | United States | Agora Ballroom | Single Bullet Theory |
| March 31, 1983 | Amherst | United States | University of Massachusetts | Shrapnel |
| April 6, 1983 | Boston | United States | The Metro | Lizzie Borden and the Axes |
| April 8, 1983 | Atlanta | United States | The Agora | |
| April 9, 1983 | New Orleans | United States | Riverboat President | |
| April 11, 1983 | Beaumont | United States | Cardi's | |
| April 13, 1983 | Dallas | United States | Agora Ballroom | |
| April 14, 1983 | Houston | United States | Rockers | |
| April 15, 1983 | Austin | United States | Austin Opry House | Jason & the Scorchers |
| April 16, 1983 | San Antonio | United States | Bonham Exchange | Our Daughter's Wedding |
| April 19, 1983 | Las Cruces | United States | Pan American Center | The Victims |
| April 20, 1983 | Phoenix | United States | Graham Central Station | |
| April 22, 1983 | Los Angeles | United States | Hollywood Palladium | The Dickies |
| April 23, 1983 | San Diego | United States | Jack Murphy Stadium (X-Fest) | —N/a |
| April 24, 1983 | Los Angeles | United States | Reseda Country Club | The Dickies |
| April 26, 1983 | Goleta | United States | Goleta Rollercade | The Dickies |
| April 27, 1983 | Santa Cruz | United States | Santa Cruz Civic Auditorium | The Batteries |
| April 28, 1983 | Palo Alto | United States | Keystone | The Lifers; The High Hitters |
| April 29, 1983 | San Francisco | United States | Kabuki Theater | Toxic Reasons |
| April 30, 1983 | Sacramento | United States | California State University, Sacramento | Toxic Reasons |
| May 2, 1983 | Eugene | United States | EMU Ballroom | D.O.A. |
| May 3, 1983 | Portland | United States | Starry Night | D.O.A. |
| May 4, 1983 | Seattle | United States | Eagles Hippodrome | D.O.A. |
| May 5, 1983 | Seattle | United States | Eagles Hippodrome | |
| May 6, 1983 | Vancouver | Canada | Commodore Ballroom | The Actionauts |
| May 9, 1983 | Denver | United States | Rainbow Music Hall | Levi and the Rockats |
| May 11, 1983 | St. Louis | United States | Mississippi Nights | Fool's Face |
| May 12, 1983 | Kansas City | United States | Uptown Theater | Mortal Micronotz |
| May 13, 1983 | Wichita | United States | Cotillion Ballroom | |
| May 15, 1983 | Minneapolis | United States | First Avenue | Soul Asylum |
| May 16, 1983 | Maidson | United States | Headliners | The Mistakes |
| May 17, 1983 | Milwaukee | United States | Eagles Ballroom | The Mob |
| May 19, 1983 | Chicago | United States | Metro Chicago | |
| May 20, 1983 | Chicago | United States | Metro Chicago | |
| May 21, 1983 | Cleveland | United States | Agora | |
| May 22, 1983 | Detroit | United States | Grand Circus Theater | The Heart Throbs |
| May 24, 1983 | Indianapolis | United States | The Vogue | |
| May 26, 1983 | Columbus | United States | Agora Ballroom | |
| May 27, 1983 | Wheeling | United States | Haymaker's | Secret Service; The Rebel Rousers |
| May 28, 1983 | Evanston | United States | Northwestern University | |
| May 29, 1983 | Chicago | United States | University of Chicago | |
| May 31, 1983 | Omaha | United States | The 20's Nightclub | |
| June 1, 1983 | Des Moines | United States | Top of the Tower | Universal Will To Become |
| June 2, 1983 | Rockford | United States | Unknown venue | |
| June 3, 1983 | Wausau | United States | Shang-ri-la Bar | |
| June 5, 1983 | Winnipeg | Canada | Pantages Playhouse Theatre | Sudden Death; Society's Grudge |
| June 7, 1983 | Calgary | Canada | Max Bell Arena | Personality Crisis |
| June 8, 1983 | Edmonton | Canada | Convention Inn Ballroom | |
| June 10, 1983 | Toronto | Canada | The Concert Hall | |
| June 11, 1983 | Toronto | Canada | The Concert Hall | |
| June 12, 1983 | Ann Arbor | United States | Second Chance | Cult Heroes |
| June 13, 1983 | Ottawa | Canada | The Jungle Club | Bugs Harvey Oswald |
| June 14, 1983 | Montreal | Canada | Le Spectrum | The Nils |
| June 20, 1983 | Virginia Beach | United States | Peabody's | |
| June 22, 1983 | Raleigh | United States | Stewart Theatre | Jimmy and th' Jonez |
| June 23, 1983 | Columbia | United States | Strider's | Prizoner |
| June 24, 1983 | Hallandale Beach | United States | Button South | |
| June 25, 1983 | Hallandale Beach | United States | Button South | |
| June 26, 1983 | St. Petersburg | United States | Jannus Landing (New Rock Fest IV) | —N/a |
| June 29, 1983 | Washington, D.C. | United States | The Bayou | |
| June 30, 1983 | Washington, D.C. | United States | The Bayou | |
| July 2, 1983 | Asbury Park | United States | Asbury Park Convention Hall | Modern English |
| July 6, 1983 | Buffalo | United States | Rooftop Skyroom | |
| July 9, 1983 | Bridgeport | United States | Utopia | |
| July 11, 1983 | Margate City | United States | Unknown venue | |
| July 13, 1983 | Wilkes-Barre | United States | The Station | Lemmy Caution |
| July 14, 1983 | Pittsburgh | United States | Heaven | |
| July 16, 1983 | New York City | United States | Pier 84 | Divinyls |
| July 22, 1983 | Hicksville | United States | The Palace Theater | |
| July 24, 1983 | Richmond | United States | Much More Club | Violent Femmes |
| July 27, 1983 | Buffalo | United States | Unknown venue | |
| July 28, 1983 | Roslyn | United States | My Father's Place | Immortal Primitives |
| July 29, 1983 | Philadelphia | United States | Philadelphia Zoo | Opening act for: The B-52's |
| July 30, 1983 | South Yarmouth | United States | Cape Cod Coliseum | Opening act for: The B-52's |
| August 5, 1983 | Quogue | United States | Suspenders | Immortal Primitives |
| August 6, 1983 | Poughkeepsie | United States | The Chance | |
| August 12, 1983 | New York City | United States | L'Amour | |
| August 13, 1983 | New York City | United States | L'Amour East | Shrapnel |
North America
| December 20, 1983 | Cedar Grove | United States | Meadowbrook Ballroom | |
| December 22, 1983 | Poughkeepsie | United States | The Chance | |
| December 23, 1983 | West Hartford | United States | West Hartford Agora | Mass |
| December 27, 1983 | Levittown | United States | Reds | |
| December 29, 1983 | New York City | United States | The Ritz | Echo & the Bunnymen |
| December 30, 1983 | Providence | United States | The Living Room | |

=== Typical setlist ===
1. "Durango 95"
2. "Teenage Lobotomy"
3. "Psycho Therapy"
4. "Blitzkrieg Bop"
5. "Do You Remember Rock 'n' Roll Radio?"
6. "All's Quiet on the Eastern Front"
7. "Gimme Gimme Shock Treatment"
8. "Rock 'n' Roll High School"
9. "I Wanna Be Sedated"
10. "Beat on the Brat"
11. "The KKK Took My Baby Away"
12. "Go Mental"
13. "Outsider"
14. "Suzy Is a Headbanger"
15. "Let's Dance" (Chris Montez cover)
16. "I'm Affected"
17. "Little Bit O' Soul" (The Music Explosion cover)
18. "Chinese Rock"
19. "In the Park"
20. "Rockaway Beach"
21. "Surfin' Bird" (The Trashmen cover)
22. "Cretin Hop"
23. "California Sun" (Joe Jones cover)
24. "Today Your Love, Tomorrow the World"
25. "Pinhead"

Encore:

26. "53rd & 3rd"
27. "Highest Trails Above"
28. "Sheena Is a Punk Rocker"

Encore 2:

29. "Time Has Come Today" (The Chambers Brothers cover)
30. "I Just Want to Have Something to Do"
31. "We're a Happy Family"

== 1984 ==
| Date | City | Country | Venue | Opening act(s) |
North America
| January 5, 1984 | New Haven | United States | Toad's Place | |
| January 6, 1984 | Boston | United States | The Channel | Mass; Digney Fignus |
| January 7, 1984 | New York City | United States | L'Amour East | |
| January 12, 1984 | Philadelphia | United States | Ripley's Music Hall | |
| January 14, 1984 | Roslyn | United States | My Father's Place | Immortal Primitives |
North America
| March 9, 1984 | Portland | United States | Unknown venue | Joe Perry; David Johansen |
| March 10, 1984 | Providence | United States | The Living Room | The Bristols |
| March 16, 1984 | Waterbury | United States | Toad's Place | Lost Generation |
| March 17, 1984 | New York City | United States | Unknown venue | |
| March 20, 1984 | Washington, D.C. | United States | Wax Museum Nightclub | The Mob |
| March 22, 1984 | Manchester | United States | The Casbah | |
| March 23, 1984 | Albany | United States | University at Albany, SUNY | The Steven Clyde Band |
| March 29, 1984 | West Hartford | United States | West Hartford Agora | Broken Angels |
| March 30, 1984 | Brockton | United States | Scotch 'n' Sounds | The Vex |
| April 6, 1984 | Salisbury | United States | Unknown venue | |
North America
| April 26, 1984 | Charlottesville | United States | University Hall | The Slickee Boys |
| April 27, 1984 | The Bronx | United States | Rose Hill Gymnasium | Walter Lure |
| April 28, 1984 | Brockport | United States | Tuttle North Gym | The Burns Sisters |
| April 29, 1984 | Storrs | United States | University of Connecticut | The Gap Band |
| May 4, 1984 | Itacha | United States | Barton Hall | |
| May 5, 1984 | Cortland | United States | Dwyer Memorial Park | Cheap Trick; David Johansen |
| May 17, 1984 | Garden City | United States | Adelphi University | |
| May 18, 1984 | New Haven | United States | Twilight Zone | |
| May 19, 1984 | Mount Ivy | United States | Club Expo | |
| May 31, 1984 | Richmond | United States | Cellar Door | Beex |
| June 1, 1984 | Norfolk | United States | The Boathouse | |
| June 8, 1984 | Ellington | United States | The Country Squire | RTM |
| June 9, 1984 | Swanzey | United States | Cheshire County Fairgrounds (Summer RockFest) | —N/a |
| June 16, 1984 | New York City | United States | L'Amour East | |
| June 28, 1984 | Providence | United States | The Living Room | |
| June 29, 1984 | Taunton | United States | Taunton High School (Red Cross Benefit) | The Neighborhoods |
| June 30, 1984 | Syracuse | United States | Lost Horizon | Masters of Reality |
| July 1, 1984 | Washington, D.C. | United States | Wax Museum Nightclub | Wrathchild America |
North America
| August 1, 1984 | Rochester | United States | Rochester Community War Memorial | Supporting act for: Billy Idol |
| August 17, 1984 | Hackettstown | United States | The Nook | |
| August 28, 1984 | New Haven | United States | Toad's Place | |
| August 30, 1984 | Selden | United States | Suffolk County Community College | |
| August 31, 1984 | West Hartford | United States | West Hartford Agora | The Mob |
| September 2, 1984 | Lido Beach | United States | Malibu Night Club | |
| September 15, 1984 | Stony Brook | United States | Stony Brook Gymnasium | Dino and the Detonators |
North America
| October 5, 1984 | Spring Valley | United States | Club Manhattan | |
| October 6, 1984 | New York City | United States | L'Amour East | |
| October 9, 1984 | Washington, D.C. | United States | Wax Museum Nightclub | |
| October 11, 1984 | North Dartmouth | United States | University of Massachusetts Dartmouth | |
| October 12, 1984 | Providence | United States | The Living Room | Rash of Stabbings |
| October 13, 1984 | Manchester | United States | The Casbah | |
| October 19, 1984 | Bethany | United States | Bethany College | |
| October 20, 1984 | Norfolk | United States | The Boathouse | |
| ~~October 24, 1984~~ | Tampa | United States | USF Sun Dome (OSP Halloween Ball) | —N/a |
| October 28, 1984 | Hallandale Beach | United States | Button South | |
| October 29, 1984 | West Palm Beach | United States | The Bowery | |
| October 30, 1984 | Hallandale Beach | United States | Button South | |
| October 31, 1984 | Gainesville | United States | The Bandshell | John Cafferty and the Beaver Brown Band |
| November 2, 1984 | Marietta | United States | Strand Theatre | |
| November 3, 1984 | Atlanta | United States | Omni Ballroom | |
| November 5, 1984 | Destin | United States | Nightown | |
| November 7, 1984 | New Orleans | United States | Riverboat President | |
| November 10, 1984 | Houston | United States | Nite Moves | |
| November 11, 1984 | Austin | United States | Austin Opry House | The Offenders |
| November 12, 1984 | Dallas | United States | Arcadia Theatre | |
| November 14, 1984 | Albuquerque | United States | Student Union Building | Crawling Walls |
| November 15, 1984 | Phoenix | United States | Palace West | Co-headlining with: Black Flag |
| November 17, 1984 | Los Angeles | United States | Hollywood Palladium | Co-headlining with: Black Flag; Supported by: Minutemen |
| November 18, 1984 | San Diego | United States | Montezuma Hall | Co-headlining with: Black Flag |
| November 20, 1984 | Los Angeles | United States | Bovard Auditorium | The Dream Syndicate |
| November 21, 1984 | Pomona | United States | Pomona Valley Auditorium | Agent Orange; Chardon Square |
| November 23, 1984 | San Francisco | United States | Kabuki Theater | Yanks |
| November 24, 1984 | Palo Alto | United States | Keystone | Yanks |
| November 27, 1984 | Portland | United States | Starry Night | |
| November 29, 1984 | Vancouver | Canada | Commodore Ballroom | Shanghai Dog |
| November 30, 1984 | Seattle | United States | Hub Ballroom | The Eagertones |
| December 1, 1984 | Eugene | United States | EMU Ballroom | The Rats; Junk 57 |
| December 3, 1984 | Carmichael | United States | Entertainment Factory | Tales of Terror; Pariah |
| December 4, 1984 | San Jose | United States | The Cabaret | |
| December 5, 1984 | Berkeley | United States | Berkeley Square | |
| December 7, 1984 | Paradise | United States | University of Nevada, Las Vegas | Unknown support |
| December 9, 1984 | Los Angeles | United States | Palace Theatre | The D.I.'s |
| December 12, 1984 | St. Louis | United States | Mississippi Nights | White Animals |
| December 13, 1984 | Milwaukee | United States | Eagles Ballroom | EIEIO |
| December 14, 1984 | Chicago | United States | Aragon Ballroom | Naked Raygun; The Higsons |
| December 15, 1984 | Detroit | United States | Traxx | |
| December 16, 1984 | Detroit | United States | Traxx | |
North America
| December 26, 1984 | West Islip | United States | Key Largo | |
| December 27, 1984 | New York City | United States | The Ritz | |
| December 28, 1984 | New York City | United States | The Ritz | |
| December 29, 1984 | Providence | United States | Lupo's Heartbreak Hotel | |

=== Typical setlist (Legs 2-5) ===
1. "Durango 95"
2. "Teenage Lobotomy"
3. "Psycho Therapy"
4. "Blitzkrieg Bop"
5. "Do You Remember Rock 'n' Roll Radio?"
6. "Danger Zone"
7. "Gimme Gimme Shock Treatment"
8. "Rock 'n' Roll High School"
9. "I Wanna Be Sedated"
10. "Beat on the Brat"
11. "The KKK Took My Baby Away"
12. "Go Mental"
13. "I Don't Wanna Walk Around with You"
14. "Suzy Is a Headbanger"
15. "Let's Dance" (Chris Montez cover)
16. "I'm Affected"
17. "Too Tough to Die"
18. "Chinese Rock"
19. "Wart Hog"
20. "Rockaway Beach"
21. "Surfin' Bird" (The Trashmen cover)
22. "Cretin Hop"
23. "California Sun" (Joe Jones cover)
24. "Today Your Love, Tomorrow the World"
25. "Pinhead"

Encore:

26. "Mama's Boy"
27. "Highest Trails Above"
28. "Sheena Is a Punk Rocker"

Encore 2:

29. "Howling at the Moon (Sha-La-La)"
30. "Judy Is a Punk"
31. "We're a Happy Family"

== 1985 ==
| Date | City | Country | Venue | Supporting act(s) |
North America
| January 3, 1985 | Boston | United States | The Metro | |
| January 4, 1985 | West Hartford | United States | West Hartford Agora | |
| January 9, 1985 | Mount Vernon | United States | Unknown venue | |
| January 12, 1985 | Asbury Park | United States | The Stone Pony | Partners in Crime |
| January 25, 1985 | Lexington | United States | Unknown venue | |
| January 30, 1985 | Washington, D.C. | United States | The Bayou | |
| January 31, 1985 | Washington, D.C. | United States | The Bayou | |
| February 7, 1985 | The Bronx | United States | Manhattan College | |
| February 8, 1985 | New York City | United States | L'Amour | |
| February 12, 1985 | Unknown venue (likely Pratt Institute Student Union, Brooklyn, NY) | United States | | |
| February 14, 1985 | Lowell | United States | Cumnock Hall | |
| February 15, 1985 | Worcester | United States | E. M. Loew's Theatre of Performing Arts | The Reducers |
| February 16, 1985 | Manchester | United States | The Casbah | |
| February 17, 1985 | Upper Darby | United States | Tower Theater | Opening act for: Joan Jett & the Blackhearts |
| February 18, 1985 | Baltimore | Girard's | | |
Europe
| February 24, 1985 | London | England | Lyceum Ballroom | Restless; Gene Loves Jezebel |
| February 25, 1985 | London | England | Lyceum Ballroom | Restless; Gene Loves Jezebel |
| February 26, 1985 | London | England | Lyceum Ballroom | Restless; Gene Loves Jezebel |
| February 27, 1985 | London | England | Lyceum Ballroom | Restless; Gene Loves Jezebel |
North America
| March 7, 1985 | Garden City | United States | University Center Ballroom | Aku Aku |
| March 8, 1985 | Providence | United States | The Living Room | |
| March 9, 1985 | New York City | United States | L'Amour | Frehley's Comet |
| March 14, 1985 | Athens | United States | Ohio University's Memorial Auditorium | |
| March 15, 1985 | Detroit | United States | Traxx | |
| March 16, 1985 | Detroit | United States | Traxx | |
| March 18, 1985 | Columbus | United States | Newport Music Hall | |
| March 19, 1985 | Newport | United States | Jockey Club | Suicidal Tendencies |
| March 20, 1985 | Pittsburgh | United States | Heaven | |
| March 29, 1985 | Buffalo | United States | Salty Dog Skyroom | |
| March 30, 1985 | Syracuse | United States | Manley Field House | Todd Hobin Band |
| March 31, 1985 | Hamden | United States | Quinnipiac College Gymnasium | New Johnny 5 |
| April 4, 1985 | Baltimore | United States | Marble Bar | |
| April 5, 1985 | Norfolk | United States | The Boathouse | |
| April 6, 1985 | Newaek | United States | Main Street Cabaret | |
| April 12, 1985 | Durham | United States | MUB Pub | |
| April 13, 1985 | Trenton | United States | City Gardens | Loudness |
North America
| April 27, 1985 | Worcester | United States | Assumption University | |
| May 3, 1985 | New Haven | United States | University of New Haven | Funkestra; Newcleus |
| May 4, 1985 | Jamesburg | United States | Emmetts Inn | The Rattlers |
| May 5, 1985 | Trenton | United States | City Gardens | |
| May 7, 1985 | Garden City | United States | Adelphi University | |
| May 9, 1985 | Rochester | United States | Scorgie's | The Essentials |
| May 10, 1985 | Buffalo | United States | Buffalo State New Gym Practice Field | The Reducers |
| May 12, 1985 | Hartford | United States | Trinity College | 'Til Tuesday |
| May 20, 1985 | Providence | United States | The Living Room | Pajama Slave Dancers |
| May 25, 1985 | Hartford | United States | Agora Ballroom | George Thorogood and The Destroyers; Regular Joes |
| May 27, 1985 | Blacksburg | United States | Burruss Hall Auditorium | George Thorogood and The Destroyers |
| May 28, 1985 | Richmond | United States | Cellar Door | Suzy Saxon and the Anglos |
| May 30, 1985 | New York City | United States | The Ritz | Crossfire Choir |
| May 31, 1985 | New York City | United States | The Ritz | Crossfire Choir |
| June 7, 1985 | Oyster Bay | United States | Unknown venue | |
| June 8, 1985 | Hampton | United States | Club Casino | |
| June 14, 1985 | Scotia | United States | Skyway Club | |
| June 15, 1985 | New York City | United States | L'Amour | |
Europe
| June 22, 1985 | Milton Keynes | England | Milton Keynes National Bowl (The Longest Day) | —N/a |
| June 24, 1985 | Dublin | Ireland | Television Club | |
| June 25, 1985 | Dublin | Ireland | Television Club | |
| June 26, 1985 | Belfast | Northern Ireland | Queen's Students’ Union | |
| June 28, 1985 | Glasgow | Scotland | Barrowland Ballroom | Styng Rites |
| June 30, 1985 | Roskilde | Denmark | Darupvej (Roskilde Festival) | —N/a |
| July 2, 1985 | West Berlin | West Germany | Tempodrom | |
| July 3, 1985 | Hamburg | West Germany | Ernst-Merck-Halle | |
| July 4, 1985 | Bochum | West Germany | Ruhrlandhalle | |
| July 6, 1985 | Torhout | Belgium | Achiel Eeckloo Rockweide (Rock Werchter) | —N/a |
| July 7, 1985 | Werchter | Belgium | Werchter Festivalpark (Rock Werchter) | —N/a |
North America
| August 9, 1985 | Worcester | United States | E. M. Loew's Theatre of Performing Arts | |
| August 10, 1985 | Middletown | United States | J. Bee's Rock III | Shy Talk |
| August 11, 1985 | Hampton Bays | United States | Unknown venue | |
| August 12, 1985 | New Haven | United States | Toad's Place | |
| August 21, 1985 | Boston | United States | Spit | |
| August 22, 1985 | Branford | United States | Sneakers | |
| August 24, 1985 | Norfolk | United States | The Boathouse | |
| August 25, 1985 | Washington, D.C. | United States | The Bayou | |
| August 26, 1985 | Washington, D.C. | United States | The Bayou | |
| August 27, 1985 | Ocean City | United States | Over The Rainbow | |
| September 1, 1985 | Lido Beach | United States | Unknown venue | |
North America
| September 20, 1985 | Hartford | United States | Agora Ballroom | Pajama Slave Dancers |
| September 21, 1985 | Albany | United States | J.B. Scott's | |
North America
| October 5, 1985 | Asbury Park | United States | The Stone Pony | |
| October 11, 1985 | Spring Valley | United States | Unknown Venue | Fahrenheit 451 |
| October 12, 1985 | Providence | United States | The Living Room | |
| October 13, 1985 | East Madow | United States | The Living Room | |
| October 26, 1985 | College Park | United States | University of Maryland, College Park | Frankie and the Actions |
| November 1, 1985 | Amherst | United States | University of Massachusetts | The Neighborhoods |
North America
| November 22, 1985 | Commack | United States | Unknown venue | |
| November 23, 1985 | Lewistown | United States | Bucknell University | The Reducers |
| November 27, 1985 | Trenton | United States | City Gardens | Mosquitos |
| November 29, 1985 | New York City | United States | L'Amour | Reagan Youth |
| December 7, 1985 | Plattsburgh | United States | Angell Center Ballroom | |
| December 31, 1985 | New York City | United States | The World | Beastie Boys |

=== Typical setlist ===
1. "Durango 95"
2. "Teenage Lobotomy"
3. "Psycho Therapy"
4. "Blitzkrieg Bop"
5. "Do You Remember Rock 'n' Roll Radio?"
6. "Danger Zone"
7. "Gimme Gimme Shock Treatment"
8. "Rock 'n' Roll High School"
9. "I Wanna Be Sedated"
10. "Beat on the Brat"
11. "The KKK Took My Baby Away"
12. "Commando"
13. "I Don't Wanna Walk Around with You" (Legs 1–2)
  "Judy Is a Punk" (Legs 3–7)
  "Loudmouth" (Legs 8–9)
14. "Suzy Is a Headbanger"
15. "Let's Dance" (Chris Montez cover)
16. "53rd & 3rd" (Replaced by "I Don't Care" after Leg 7)
17. "Too Tough to Die"
18. "Chinese Rock"
19. "Wart Hog"
20. "Rockaway Beach"
21. "Surfin' Bird" (The Trashmen cover)
22. "Cretin Hop"
23. "California Sun" (Joe Jones cover)
24. "Today Your Love, Tomorrow the World"
25. "Pinhead"

Encore:

26. "Mama's Boy"
27. "Highest Trails Above"
28. "Sheena Is a Punk Rocker"

Encore 2:

29. "Chasing the Night" or "Howling at the Moon (Sha-La-La)" (Replaced by "Do You Want to Dance" after Leg 7)
30. "I Don't Wanna Walk Around with You" (Replaced "I Don't Wanna Go Down to the Basement" after Leg 2)
31. "We're a Happy Family"

== 1986 ==
| Date | City | Country | Venue | Opening act(s) |
North America
| April 11, 1986 | Fredonia | United States | Williams Center | The Splatcats |
| April 12, 1986 | Rochester | United States | The Palestra | Mosquitos |
| April 17, 1986 | Philadelphia | United States | Temple University | |
| April 19, 1986 | Winooski | United States | St. Michael's College | |
| April 20, 1986 | Durham | United States | University of New Hampshire Field House | Perfect Edge |
| April 25, 1986 | Randolph | United States | Obsessions | |
| April 26, 1986 | New Brunswick | United States | Livingston Campus Lawn | |
Europe
| May 4, 1986 | London | England | Hammersmith Palais | The Prisoners; Thrashing Doves |
| May 5, 1986 | London | England | Hammersmith Palais | The Prisoners; Thrashing Doves |
| May 6, 1986 | London | England | Clarendon Hotel Ballroom | |
| May 7, 1986 | Brighton | England | Top Rank Suite | The Prisoners |
| May 8, 1986 | Poole | England | Poole Arts Centre | The Prisoners |
| May 9, 1986 | St. Austell | England | Cornwall Coliseum | |
| May 11, 1986 | Bristol | England | The Studio | The Prisoners |
| May 12, 1986 | Birmingham | England | Birmingham Odeon | The Prisoners |
| May 13, 1986 | Preston | England | Preston Guild Hall | |
| May 14, 1986 | Edinburgh | Scotland | Edinburgh Playhouse | The Prisoners |
| May 15, 1986 | Newcastle | England | Mayfair Ballroom | The Prisoners |
| May 17, 1986 | Leeds | England | University of Leeds | The Prisoners |
| May 18, 1986 | Manchester | England | Manchester Apollo | The Prisoners |
| May 19, 1986 | Nottingham | England | Rock City | The Prisoners |
North America
| June 20, 1986 | Albany | United States | J.B. Scott's | |
| June 21, 1986 | West Hartford | United States | West Hartford Agora | The Queers |
| June 22, 1986 | Hampton Beach | United States | Club Casino | Infidelics |
| June 24, 1986 | New Haven | United States | Toad's Place | The Queers |
| June 25, 1986 | Providence | United States | The Living Room | |
| June 27, 1986 | New York City | United States | L'Amour | |
| June 28, 1986 | Philadelphia | United States | Chestnut Cabaret | Duck Tape |
| June 29, 1986 | Baltimore | United States | Hammerjack's | |
| June 30, 1986 | Norfolk | United States | The Boathouse | The Smithereens |
| July 1, 1986 | Washington, D.C. | United States | The Bayou | The Smithereens |
| July 2, 1986 | Washington, D.C. | United States | The Bayou | The Smithereens |
| July 8, 1986 | Oyster Bay | United States | Rumrunner | —N/a |
| July 11, 1986 | Trenton | United States | City Gardens | The Shades |
| July 12, 1986 | Asbury Park | United States | The Stone Pony | |
| July 17, 1986 | McKees Rocks | United States | Mancini's Lounge | |
| July 19, 1986 | Detroit | United States | Traxx | |
| July 20, 1986 | Detroit | United States | Traxx | |
| July 21, 1986 | Lakewood | United States | Phantasy Theater | Attitude |
| July 22, 1986 | Columbus | United States | Newport Music Hall | Infidelics |
| July 23, 1986 | Newport | United States | Jockey Club | Angry Red Planet |
| July 25, 1986 | Chicago | United States | Metro Chicago | The Service; The Dead Milkmen |
| July 26, 1986 | Chicago | United States | Metro Chicago | The Service; The Dead Milkmen |
| July 27, 1986 | Minneapolis | United States | First Avenue | |
Europe
| August 2, 1986 | Veurne | Belgium | Kruispunt Europalaan Pannestraat (Seaside Festival) | —N/a |
| August 3, 1986 | Sneek | Netherlands | IJsbaanterrein (Sneekwave) | —N/a |
| August 4, 1986 | Amsterdam | Netherlands | Melkweg | Ivy Green |
| August 5, 1986 | Amsterdam | Netherlands | Melkweg | |
North America
| August 31, 1986 | Lido Beach | United States | Unknown venue | |
| September 11, 1986 | San Diego | United States | UCSD Gymnasium | |
| September 13, 1986 | Los Angeles | United States | Hollywood Palladium | Social Distortion |
| September 14, 1986 | Carmichael | United States | El Dorado Saloon | Social Unrest; Doggy Style |
| September 15, 1986 | San Francisco | United States | Wolfgang's | The Afflicted |
| September 16, 1986 | San Francisco | United States | Wolfgang's | Jetboy |
| September 17, 1986 | Santa Clara | United States | One Step Beyond | |
| September 19, 1986 | Long Beach | United States | Fender's Ballroom | The Vandals; Screamin' Sirens |
| September 21, 1986 | Los Angeles | United States | The Palace | Channel 3 Chardon Square |
| September 22, 1986 | Riverside | United States | Club Metro | Channel 3 Chardon Square |
| September 23, 1986 | San Diego | United States | Bacchanal | |
| September 24, 1986 | West Hollywood | United States | Whisky a Go Go | Secret Surprise |
North America
| October 10, 1986 | Trenton | United States | City Gardens | |
| October 11, 1986 | New York City | United States | L'Amour | |
| October 16, 1986 | Northampton | United States | Pearl Street | |
| October 17, 1986 | West Hartford | United States | West Hartford Agora | The Reducers |
| October 18, 1986 | Providence | United States | The Living Room | |
| October 24, 1986 | Washington, D.C. | United States | The Tavern | |
| October 25, 1986 | Philadelphia | United States | Chestnut Cabaret | Duck Tape |
| October 31, 1986 | Roslyn | United States | My Father's Place | |
| November 1, 1986 | Bridgeport | United States | University of Bridgeport | |
| November 3, 1986 | Boston | United States | The Metro | |
| November 6, 1986 | New York City | United States | The Ritz | The Chesterfield Kings |
| November 7, 1986 | New York City | United States | The Ritz | The Chesterfield Kings |
| November 15, 1986 | Kent | United States | Kent State University | |
| November 16, 1986 | Buffalo | United States | The Inferno | |
| November 18, 1986 | Montclair | United States | Montclair State College | |
| November 21, 1986 | South Amboy | United States | Club Bene | |
| November 22, 1986 | Medford | United States | Tufts University | Barrence Whitfield & the Savages |
| December 4, 1986 | Waltham | United States | Levin Ballroom | The Lemonheads |
| December 5, 1986 | Rochester | United States | Unknown venue | |
| December 6, 1986 | Alfred | United States | Alfred University | The Chesterfield Kings |
| December 19, 1986 | New York City | United States | L'Amour East | |
| December 20, 1986 | Bay Shore | United States | Sundance | |
| December 31, 1986 | Roslyn | United States | My Father's Place | |

=== Typical setlist ===
1. "Eat That Rat"
2. "Teenage Lobotomy"
3. "Psycho Therapy"
4. "Blitzkrieg Bop"
5. "Do You Remember Rock 'n' Roll Radio?"
6. "Freak of Nature"
7. "Gimme Gimme Shock Treatment"
8. "Rock 'n' Roll High School"
9. "I Wanna Be Sedated"
10. "The KKK Took My Baby Away"
11. "Crummy Stuff"
12. "Loudmouth"
13. "Love Kills"
14. "Sheena Is a Punk Rocker"
15. "Glad to See You Go"
16. "I Just Want to Have Something to Do"
17. "Too Tough to Die"
18. "Mama's Boy"
19. "Animal Boy"
20. "Wart Hog"
21. "Surfin' Bird" (The Trashmen cover)
22. "Cretin Hop"
23. "I Don't Wanna Walk Around With You"
24. "Today Your Love, Tomorrow the World"
25. "Pinhead"

Encore:

26. "Chinese Rock"
27. "Somebody Put Something in My Drink"
28. "Rockaway Beach"

Encore 2:

29. "Do You Want to Dance" (Bobby Freeman cover)
30. "California Sun" (Joe Jones cover)
31. "We're a Happy Family"

== 1987 ==
| Date | City | Country | Venue | Opening act(s) |
North America
| January 3, 1987 | Trenton | United States | City Gardens | Shock Mommies |
| January 4, 1987 | Washington, D.C. | United States | The Bayou | |
North America
| January 23, 1987 | Providence | United States | The Living Room | |
| January 24, 1987 | Poughkeepsie | United States | The Chance | Zebra |
South America
| January 31, 1987 | São Paulo | Brazil | Palace Theatre | |
| February 1, 1987 | São Paulo | Brazil | Palace Theatre | |
| February 4, 1987 | Buenos Aires | Argentina | Estadio Obras Sanitarias | |
North America
| February 20, 1987 | Pittsburgh | United States | Syria Mosque | The Cynics |
| February 21, 1987 | Allentown | United States | Airport Road Music Hall | The Mating Index |
| February 26, 1987 | Wayne | United States | William Paterson University | |
| February 27, 1987 | Asbury Park | United States | The Stone Pony | Aerrage |
| February 28, 1987 | Philadelphia | United States | Chestnut Cabaret | The Daves |
North America
| March 20, 1987 | Dallas | United States | Longhorn Ballroom | |
| March 21, 1987 | Austin | United States | The Backroom | Zulu Time |
| March 22, 1987 | Houston | United States | The Fast and Cool Club | |
| March 23, 1987 | New Orleans | United States | McAlister Auditorium | Skinsect |
| March 25, 1987 | Atlanta | United States | Buckhead Cinema and Drafthouse | Drivin N Cryin |
| March 26, 1987 | Tallahassee | United States | The Moon | The Slut Boys |
| March 27, 1987 | Tampa | United States | Fort Homer Hesterly Armory | The Fanatics |
| March 28, 1987 | Cocoa Beach | United States | Brassy's Nightclub | |
| March 29, 1987 | Miami Beach | United States | Cameo Theatre | The Drills |
North America
| April 22, 1987 | Garden City | United States | Nassau Community College | |
| April 23, 1987 | New York City | United States | Wave Street | Crash Conference |
| April 25, 1987 | West Hartford | United States | West Hartford Agora | The Reducers; The Ring |
| April 26, 1987 | New Haven | United States | Toad's Place | Last Supper |
| April 30, 1987 | Williamstown | United States | Unknown venue | |
| May 1, 1987 | Brunswick | United States | Bowdoin College | |
| May 2, 1987 | Albany | United States | State University of New York at Albany | Co-headlining with: Joan Jett & the Blackhearts |
| May 3, 1987 | Hadley | United States | Katina's | Shake the Faith |
| May 8, 1987 | Randolph | United States | Obsessions | Maximum America |
| May 9, 1987 | New York City | United States | L'Amour | |
| May 15, 1987 | Providence | United States | The Living Room | |
| May 16, 1987 | Bay Shore | United States | Sundance | |
| May 29, 1987 | Darien Lake | United States | Darien Lake Theme Park Resort | |
| May 30, 1987 | Poughkeepsie | United States | The Chance | |
North America
| June 18, 1987 | Harrisburg | United States | The Metron | |
| June 19, 1987 | Ocean City | United States | Scandals Nightclub | |
| June 20, 1987 | Philadelphia | United States | Chestnut Cabaret | |
| June 26, 1987 | Oyster Bay | United States | Rumrunner | |
| June 27, 1987 | New York City | United States | Flushing Meadows Park (Queens Festival '87) | —N/a |
| June 28, 1987 | Washington, D.C. | United States | The Bayou | |
| June 29, 1987 | Washington, D.C. | United States | The Bayou | |
| June 30, 1987 | Washington, D.C. | United States | The Bayou | |
| July 1, 1987 | Norfolk | United States | The Boathouse | |
North America
| July 21, 1987 | Toronto | Canada | RPM Club | Shadowy Men on a Shadowy Planet |
| July 22, 1987 | Toronto | Canada | RPM Club | Shadowy Men on a Shadowy Planet |
| July 23, 1987 | Toronto | Canada | RPM Club | Forgotten Rebels |
| July 24, 1987 | Ottawa | Canada | Porter Hall | Grave Concern |
North America
| August 12, 1987 | East Hampton | United States | Jag (Richie's last show) | |
North America
| August 28, 1987* | Providence | United States | The Living Room | |
| August 29, 1987* | Trenton | United States | City Gardens | Warzone; Goo Goo Dolls |
| September 4, 1987 | Oyster Bay | United States | Heartbeat (First show with Marky again) | |
| September 5, 1987 | Washington, D.C. | United States | Unknown venue | |
| September 6, 1987 | Commack | United States | Unknown venue | |
| September 10, 1987 | New York City | United States | The Ritz | Manitoba's Wild Kingdom |
| September 11, 1987 | New York City | United States | The Ritz | Crash Conference |
| September 16, 1987 | Spring Valley | United States | Club Tronix | |
| September 18, 1987 | Los Angeles | United States | Hollywood Palladium | T.S.O.L. |
| September 19, 1987 | Fresno | United States | Wilson Theatre | T.S.O.L. |
| September 21, 1987 | San Francisco | United States | City Nights Club | Attitude |
| September 22, 1987 | San Francisco | United States | The Stone | T.S.O.L. Sea Hags |
| September 23, 1987 | Santa Clara | United States | One Step Beyond | |
| September 25, 1987 | Long Beach | United States | Fender's Ballroom | D.I. The Neighborhoods |
| September 26, 1987 | Los Angeles | United States | California State University, Northridge | The Dickies |
| September 27, 1987 | West Hollywood | United States | The Roxy | T.S.O.L. |
Europe
| October 5, 1987 | Copenhagen | Denmark | Saga Rockteater | Gaye Bykers on Acid |
| October 6, 1987 | Hamburg | West Germany | Große Freiheit 36 | Gaye Bykers on Acid |
| October 7, 1987 | Amsterdam | Netherlands | Paradiso Grote Zaal | Gaye Bykers on Acid |
| October 8, 1987 | Düsseldorf | West Germany | Tor 3 | Gaye Bykers on Acid |
| October 9, 1987 | Munich | West Germany | Alabama-Halle | Gaye Bykers on Acid |
| October 11, 1987 | Milan | Italy | Prego Club | Gaye Bykers on Acid |
| October 12, 1987 | Zürich | Switzerland | Volkshaus | Gaye Bykers on Acid |
| October 13, 1987 | Paris | France | Théâtre de la Mutualité | Gaye Bykers on Acid |
| October 15, 1987 | Sheffield | England | Octagon Centre | The Sex Gods |
| October 16, 1987 | Newcastle | England | Mayfair Ballroom | |
| October 17, 1987 | Leeds | England | University of Leeds | The Sex Gods |
| October 18, 1987 | Glasgow | Scotland | Barrowland Ballroom | The Sex Gods |
| October 20, 1987 | Nottingham | England | Rock City | The Sex Gods |
| October 21, 1987 | Norwich | England | University of East Anglia | |
| October 22, 1987 | Manchester | England | International II | |
| October 23, 1987 | Liverpool | England | University of Liverpool | The Sex Gods |
| October 24, 1987 | Cardiff | Wales | Cardiff University | The Sex Gods |
| October 25, 1987 | Birmingham | England | The Hummingbird | Flesh for Lulu; The Sex Gods |
| October 26, 1987 | London | England | Brixton Academy | Flesh for Lulu; The Sex Gods |
North America
| October 31, 1987 | Alexandria | United States | Unknown venue | |
| November 12, 1987 | Wilmington | United States | Mad Monk | |
| November 13, 1987 | Greenville | United States | The Attic | Soul Train |
| November 14, 1987 | Charlotte | United States | Kidnappers | Misguided Youth |
| November 15, 1987 | Charlottesville | United States | Trax | |
| November 18, 1987 | Boston | United States | The Metro | |
| November 19, 1987 | Providence | United States | The Living Room | |
| November 20, 1987 | Allentown | United States | Airport Road Music Hall | The Original Sins |
| November 21, 1987 | New York City | United States | L'Amour | |
| November 22, 1987 | Glassboro | United States | Esbjornson Gymnasium | |
| November 27, 1987 | Bay Shore | United States | Sundance | |
| December 3, 1987 | New Haven | United States | Toad's Place | Manitoba's Wild Kingdom |
| December 4, 1987 | Randolph | United States | Obsessions | Manitoba's Wild Kingdom |
| December 5, 1987 | Poughkeepsie | United States | Vassar College | |
| December 9, 1987 | Baltimore | United States | Hammerjack's | The Slickees; The Vamps |
| December 10, 1987 | Washington, D.C. | United States | The Bayou | |
| December 11, 1987 | Washington, D.C. | United States | The Bayou | |
| December 12, 1987 | Oyster Bay | United States | Unknown venue | |
| December 13, 1987 | Philadelphia | United States | Trocadero Theatre | |
| December 31, 1987 | Bay Shore | United States | Sundance | |

*With Clem Burke on drums

=== First setlist ===
1. "Eat That Rat" or "Durango 95"
2. "Teenage Lobotomy"
3. "Psycho Therapy"
4. "Blitzkrieg Bop"
5. "Do You Remember Rock 'n' Roll Radio?"
6. "Freak of Nature"
7. "Gimme Gimme Shock Treatment"
8. "Rock 'n' Roll High School"
9. "I Wanna Be Sedated"
10. "The KKK Took My Baby Away"
11. "Crummy Stuff"
12. "Loudmouth" or "Weasel Face" or "Bop Til' You Drop" or "Rockaway Beach"
13. "Love Kills"
14. "Sheena Is a Punk Rocker"
15. "Glad to See You Go"
16. "I Don't Care" (Replaced "I Just Want to Have Something to Do" after Leg 2)
17. "Too Tough to Die"
18. "Mama's Boy"
19. "Animal Boy"
20. "Wart Hog"
21. "Surfin' Bird" (The Trashmen cover)
22. "Cretin Hop"
23. "I Don't Wanna Walk Around with You"
24. "Today Your Love, Tomorrow the World"
25. "Pinhead"

Encore:

26. "Chinese Rock"
27. "Somebody Put Something in My Drink"
28. "Bonzo Goes to Bitburg" or "Rockaway Beach"

Encore 2:

29. "Do You Want to Dance" (Bobby Freeman cover)
30. "California Sun" (Joe Jones cover)
31. "We're a Happy Family"

=== Second setlist ===
1. "Durango 95"
2. "Teenage Lobotomy"
3. "Psycho Therapy"
4. "Blitzkrieg Bop"
5. "Do You Remember Rock 'n' Roll Radio?"
6. "Bop Til' You Drop"
7. "Gimme Gimme Shock Treatment"
8. "Rock 'n' Roll High School"
9. "I Wanna Be Sedated"
10. "The KKK Took My Baby Away"
11. "Chinese Rock"
12. "Weasel Face"
13. "Love Kills"
14. "Sheena Is a Punk Rocker"
15. "Rockaway Beach"
16. "Garden of Serenity"
17. "Too Tough to Die"
18. "Mama's Boy"
19. "Animal Boy"
20. "Wart Hog"
21. "Surfin' Bird" (The Trashmen cover)
22. "Cretin Hop"
23. "I Don't Wanna Walk Around with You"
24. "Today Your Love, Tomorrow the World"
25. "Pinhead"

Encore:

26. "I Wanna Live"
27. "Somebody Put Something in My Drink"
28. "Bonzo Goes to Bitburg"

Encore 2:

29. "Do You Want to Dance" (Bobby Freeman cover)
30. "California Sun" (Joe Jones cover)
31. "We're a Happy Family"

== 1988 ==
| Date | City | Country | Venue | Opening act(s) |
North America
| January 1, 1988 | Trenton | United States | City Gardens | Adrenalin O.D. |
| January 2, 1988 | New York City | United States | The Ritz | Manitoba's Wild Kingdom |
North America
| January 28, 1988 | Dallas | United States | Arcadia Theater | The Neighborhood |
| January 29, 1988 | Austin | United States | The Back Room | The Neighborhood |
| January 30, 1988 | Austin | United States | The Back Room | The Neighborhood |
| January 31, 1988 | Houston | United States | Club Xcess | |
| February 1, 1998 | New Orleans | United States | Tipitina's | Dash Rip Rock |
| February 3, 1988 | Atlanta | United States | Center Stage | Antiheroes |
| February 4, 1988 | Tallahassee | United States | The Moon | Corrosion of Conformity |
| February 5, 1988 | Jacksonville | United States | Unknown venue | |
| February 6, 1988 | St. Petersburg | United States | Jannus Landing | Corrosion of Conformity |
| February 7, 1988 | Miami | United States | Club 1235 | Corrosion of Conformity |
North America
| February 19, 1988 | Aguadilla | Puerto Rico | Ramey Air Force Base | |
| February 20, 1988 | Aguadilla | Puerto Rico | Ramey Air Force Base | |
North America
| March 11, 1988 | South Amboy | United States | Club Bene | |
| March 12, 1988 | New York City | United States | Unknown venue | |
| March 13, 1988 | Hempstead | United States | Unknown venue | |
| March 18, 1988 | Oswego | United States | Laker Hall Gym | Heathen's Rage |
| March 19, 1988 | Rochester | United States | Idols | Cowpokes |
| March 24, 1988 | New York City | United States | Wave Street | |
| March 26, 1988 | Allentown | United States | Airport Road Music Hall | The Original Sins |
North America
| April 22, 1988 | Trenton | United States | City Gardens | Prong |
| April 23, 1988 | Philadelphia | United States | Hank DeVincent Field | Beru Revue; The Romantics |
| April 27, 1988 | Providence | United States | The Living Room | Beve Buell & The Gargoyles |
| April 29, 1988 | Commack | United States | Showcase | |
| April 30, 1988 | Oneonta NY | United States | Gymnasium [Denny Dent | |
| May 3, 1988 | Toronto | Canada | RPM Club | The Dik Van Dykes |
| May 4, 1988 | Toronto | Canada | RPM Club | The Dik Van Dykes |
| May 5, 1988 | Toronto | Canada | RPM Club | The Dik Van Dykes |
| May 6, 1988 | Amherst | United States | Baird Point (Spring Fest) | —N/a |
| May 7, 1988 | Rochester | United States | Frank Ritter Memorial Ice Arena | Unknown support |
| May 19, 1988 | Brewster | United States | Unknown venue | |
| May 20, 1988 | New Rochelle | United States | Streets | |
| May 21, 1988 | Philadelphia | United States | Chestnut Cabaret | Living Colour |
Europe
| June 2, 1988 | Stockholm | Sweden | Gröna Lund | |
| June 3, 1988 | Lund | Sweden | Mejeriet | |
| June 4, 1988 | Seinäjoki | Finland | Törnävä (Provinssirock) | —N/a |
| June 6, 1988 | Paris | France | Elysée Montmartre | The Seers |
| June 7, 1988 | Tilburg | Netherlands | Noorderligt | The Seers |
| June 8, 1988 | Amsterdam | Netherlands | Paradiso Grote Zaal | The Seers |
| June 9, 1988 | Amsterdam | Netherlands | Paradiso Grote Zaal | The Seers |
| June 10, 1988 | Groningen | Netherlands | De Oosterpoort | The Seers; Boegies |
| June 11, 1988 | Göttingen | West Germany | Sportpark (Rock im Sportpark Festival) | —N/a |
| June 12, 1988 | West Berlin | West Germany | Messehalle 1 | The Stranglers; The Godfathers; The Seers |
| June 13, 1988 | Düsseldorf | West Germany | Philipshalle | The Stranglers; The Godfathers; The Seers |
| June 15, 1988 | London | England | Brixton Academy | The Seers; Crazy Pink Revolvers; Romeo Street Gang |
North America
| July 1, 1988 | New York City | United States | L'Amour | Cycle Sluts from Hell |
| July 2, 1988 | Poughkeepsie | United States | The Chance | |
| July 7, 1988 | San Diego | United States | Bacchanal | The Giant Burritos |
| July 8, 1988 | Los Angeles | United States | Hollywood Palladium | The Dickies |
| July 10, 1988 | San Francisco | United States | The Fillmore | Sea Hags; The Field Mice |
| July 11, 1988 | San Francisco | United States | The Fillmore | The Dickies; Snatches of Pink |
| July 12, 1988 | Santa Clara | United States | One Step Beyond | The Dickies |
| July 13, 1988 | Santa Clara | United States | One Step Beyond | The Dickies |
| July 15, 1988 | Anaheim | United States | Celebrity Theatre | Adolescents; The Crowd |
| July 16, 1988 | Los Angeles | United States | John Anson Ford Amphitheatre | Thelonious Monster; Camper Van Beethoven |
| July 17, 1988 | Santa Barbara | United States | The Graduate | Adolescents; Lazy Cowgirls |
| July 18, 1988 | West Hollywood | United States | Roxy Theatre | |
North America
| August 2, 1988 | New Haven | United States | Toad's Place | |
| August 3, 1988 | Uniondale | United States | Lobster A-Go-Go | |
| August 4, 1988 | Brewster | United States | Polo's | |
| August 5, 1988 | Trenton | United States | City Gardens | The Dickies |
| August 12, 1988 | Commack | United States | Showcase | |
| August 13, 1988 | Philadelphia | United States | Chestnut Cabaret | The Waldos |
| August 14, 1988 | Baltimore | United States | Hammerjack's | |
| August 15, 1988 | Washington, D.C. | United States | The Bayou | |
| August 16, 1988 | Washington, D.C. | United States | The Bayou | |
| August 19, 1988 | New York City | United States | The Ritz | The Dickies; Richie Stotts Band |
| August 20, 1988 | New York City | United States | The Ritz | The Dickies; Cycle Sluts from Hell |
Europe
| August 26, 1988 | Reading | England | Little John's Farm (Reading Festival) | —N/a |
| August 27, 1988 | Hechtel-Eksel | Belgium | Sanicole Airfield (Pukkelpop) | —N/a |
North America
| September 13, 1988 | South Amboy | United States | Club Bene | |
| September 14, 1988 | Boston | United States | The Channel | Voodoo Dolls; The Matweeds |
| September 15, 1988 | Providence | United States | The Living Room | Jane's Addiction |
| September 21, 1988 | Pittsburgh | United States | Syria Mosque | Jane's Addiction |
| September 22, 1988 | Kent | United States | The Draft House | —N/a |
| September 23, 1988 | Chicago | United States | Aragon Ballroom | Co-headlining with: Iggy Pop; Supported by: The Dickies |
| September 24, 1988 | Detroit | United States | Harpo's | The Dickies |
| September 26, 1988 | Cincinnati | United States | Bogart's | The Dickies |
| September 27, 1988 | Columbus | United States | Newport Music Hall | |
| September 28, 1988 | Indianapolis | United States | The Vogue | The Dickies |
| September 29, 1988 | St. Louis | United States | Mississippi Nights | The Dickies |
| October 1, 1988 | Lakewood | United States | Phantasy Theater | The Dickies |
| October 6, 1988 | New York City | United States | Unknown venue | |
| October 7, 1988 | Poughkeepsie | United States | The Chance | |
| October 8, 1988 | Rochester | United States | Renaissance Theater | The Fugitives |
| October 9, 1988 | Cohoes | United States | Saratoga Winners | |
| October 13, 1988 | Island Park | United States | Club California | |
| October 14, 1988 | Trenton | United States | City Gardens | The Citizens |
| October 15, 1988 | Trenton | United States | City Gardens | Vision |
Asia
| October 24, 1988 | Tokyo | Japan | Nakano Sun Plaza | |
| October 25, 1988 | Tokyo | Japan | Nakano Sun Plaza | |
| October 26, 1988 | Kobe | Japan | Fish Dance Hall | |
| October 27, 1988 | Osaka | Japan | Midou Kaikan | |
| October 28, 1988 | Tokyo | Japan | MZA Ariake | |
North America
| November 11, 1988 | Dallas | United States | Arcadia Theatre | The Buck Pets |
| November 12, 1988 | Austin | United States | The Backroom | The Buck Pets |
| November 13, 1988 | Austin | United States | The Backroom | The Buck Pets |
| November 14, 1988 | College Station | United States | The Parthenon | —N/a |
| November 15, 1988 | Houston | United States | Club Xcess | |
| November 16, 1988 | New Orleans | United States | Tipitina's | |
| November 18, 1988 | St. Petersburg | United States | Jannus Landing | The Dickies |
| November 19, 1988 | Miami Beach | United States | Cameo Theatre | The Dickies |
| November 20, 1988 | Orlando | United States | Visage Nightclub | Rose Shadows |
| November 22, 1988 | Atlanta | United States | Center Stage | |
| December 1, 1988 | New York City | United States | Fordham University | |
| December 2, 1988 | Baltimore | United States | Hammerjack's | |
| December 10, 1988 | Durham | United States | University of New Hampshire | |
| December 11, 1988 | New Haven | United States | Toad's Place | The Dissidents |
North America
| December 30, 1988 | Providence | United States | The Living Room | Voodoo Dolls |
| December 31, 1988 | New York City | United States | Irving Plaza | Richie Stotts |

=== Typical setlist ===
1. "Durango 95"
2. "Teenage Lobotomy"
3. "Psycho Therapy"
4. "Blitzkrieg Bop"
5. "Do You Remember Rock 'n' Roll Radio?"
6. "Bop Til' You Drop"
7. "Gimme Gimme Shock Treatment"
8. "Rock 'n' Roll High School"
9. "I Wanna Be Sedated"
10. "I Don't Want You" or "Beat on the Brat"
11. "Chinese Rock"
12. "Weasel Face"
13. "Commando"
14. "Sheena Is a Punk Rocker"
15. "Rockaway Beach"
16. "Garden of Serenity" (Legs 1–7)
  "Needles and Pins" (Jackie DeShannon cover) (Legs 7–10)
  "Here Today, Gone Tomorrow" (Legs 11–12)
17. "I Just Want to Have Something to Do"
18. "Too Tough to Die"
19. "Mama's Boy"
20. "Animal Boy"
21. "Wart Hog"
22. "Surfin' Bird" (The Trashmen cover)
23. "Cretin Hop"
24. "I Don't Wanna Walk Around with You"
25. "Today Your Love, Tomorrow the World"
26. "Pinhead"

Encore:

27. "I Wanna Live"
28. "Somebody Put Something in My Drink"
29. "Bonzo Goes to Bitburg"

Encore 2:

1. "Do You Want to Dance" (Bobby Freeman cover)
2. "California Sun" (Joe Jones cover) or "Let's Dance" (Chris Montez cover) or "Judy Is a Punk"
3. "We're a Happy Family"

== 1989 ==
| Date | City | Country | Venue | Opening act(s) |
North America
| January 16, 1989 | Washington, D.C. | United States | The Bayou | |
| January 17, 1989 | Washington, D.C. | United States | The Bayou | |
| January 19, 1989 | Nashville | United States | Center Stage Club | Manikenz |
| January 20, 1989 | Lexington | United States | Rhinestones Music Palace | |
| January 21, 1989 | Louisville | United States | Phoenix Hill Tavern | |
| January 23, 1989 | Columbia | United States | Greenstreets | |
| January 24, 1989 | Charlotte | United States | Pterodactyl Club | Surfin' Sid; The Moguls |
| January 25, 1989 | Norfolk | United States | The Boathouse | |
| January 27, 1989 | New York City | United States | The Ritz | Circus of Power |
| January 28, 1989 | New York City | United States | The Ritz | Circus of Power |
Europe
| February 7, 1989 | Madrid | Spain | Pabellón de la Ciudad Deportiva del Real Madrid | BB sin sed |
| February 8, 1989 | Barcelona | Spain | Palau dels Esports | BB sin sed |
| February 9, 1989 | Valencia | Spain | Arena Auditorium | BB sin sed |
| February 10, 1989 | Valencia | Spain | Arena Auditorium | BB sin sed |
| February 11, 1989 | San Sebastián | Spain | Polideportivo Anoeta | BB sin sed |
| February 12, 1989 | San Sebastián | Spain | Polideportivo Anoeta | BB sin sed |
North America
| February 24, 1989 | Poughkeepsie | United States | The Chance | Richie Stotts |
| February 25, 1989 | Philadelphia | United States | Chestnut Cabaret | Jodi Bongiovi |
North America
| March 24, 1989 | Canton | United States | Madill Hall | Story Lloyd |
| March 25, 1989 | Cohoes | United States | Saratoga Winners | |
| March 31, 1989 | New York City | United States | Our Lady of Lourdes Church | Norman Bates & The Showerheads |
| April 1, 1989 | Baltimore | United States | Hammerjack's | |
| April 6, 1989 | New Haven | United States | Toad's Place | |
| April 7, 1989 | Lancaster | United States | The Chameleon Club | The Original Sins |
| April 15, 1989 | Stony Brook | United States | Stony Brook University | |
Europe
| May 2, 1989 | Monfalcone | Italy | Valentini's Disco | |
| May 3, 1989 | Milan | Italy | Rolling Stone | |
| May 4, 1989 | Florence | Italy | Palasport | |
| May 6, 1989 | Dueville | Italy | Palasport | |
| May 7, 1989 | Rimini | Italy | Velvet Club | |
| May 8, 1989 | Modena | Italy | Palasport | |
| May 9, 1989 | Rome | Italy | Teatro Tendastrisce | |
| May 10, 1989 | Corciano | Italy | Quasar Club | |
| May 12, 1989 | Athens | Greece | Rodon Club | |
| May 13, 1989 | Athens | Greece | Rodon Club | |
| May 14, 1989 | Athens | Greece | Rodon Club | |
| May 15, 1989 | Athens | Greece | Rodon Club | |
North America
| May 26, 1989 | Boston | United States | The Channel | The Queers Classic Ruins |
| May 27, 1989 | Providence | United States | The Living Room | High Horse |
| June 2, 1989 | Los Angeles | United States | Hollywood Palladium | |
| June 3, 1989 | Long Beach | United States | California State University | Agent Orange Richie Stotts |
| June 4, 1989 | Los Angeles | United States | Reseda Country Club | Murphy's Law; Richie Stotts |
| June 15, 1989 | Seattle | United States | 99 Club | |
| June 17, 1989 | San Francisco | United States | The Stone | Siren Kings; Liquid Sky |
| June 18, 1989 | Petaluma | United States | Phoenix Theater | Murphy's Law |
| June 19, 1989 | Santa Clara | United States | One Step Beyond | Murphy's Law |
| June 20, 1989 | Santa Barbara | United States | La Casa de la Raza | R.K.L. Chemikill |
| June 22, 1989 | San Diego | United States | Bacchanal | |
| June 23, 1989 | Tijuana | Mexico | Iguana's Nightclub | |
| June 24, 1989 | San Pedro | United States | Warner Grand Theatre | Bad Religion Firehose |
| June 25, 1989 | Los Angeles | United States | Reseda Country Club | The Hangmen; The Dickies |
| June 27, 1989 | Portland | United States | Starry Night | |
| June 28, 1989 | Vancouver | Canada | 86th Street Music Hall | |
| June 29, 1989 | Seattle | United States | 99 Club | |
| July 1, 1989 | San Francisco | United States | The Fillmore | Murphy's Law; White Trash Debutantes |
| July 2, 1989 | San Francisco | United States | The Fillmore | Murphy's Law; White Trash Debutantes |
| July 3, 1989 | Santa Cruz | United States | The Catalyst | |
| July 4, 1989 | Santa Clara | United States | One Step Beyond (Dee Dee's last shows) | |
| July 5, 1989 | Santa Clara | United States | One Step Beyond (Dee Dee's last shows) | |
Europe
| September 30, 1989 | Leicester | England | Rockandy (C.J.'s first show) | The Almighty |
| October 1, 1989 | Liverpool | England | Royal Court Theatre | John Moore & the Expressway |
| October 2, 1989 | Glasgow | Scotland | Barrowland Ballroom | |
| October 3, 1989 | Newcastle | England | Mayfair Ballroom | John Moore & the Expressway |
| October 4, 1989 | Manchester | England | International 2 | The Almighty |
| October 6, 1989 | Leeds | England | University of Leeds | John Moore & the Expressway |
| October 7, 1989 | Birmingham | England | The Hummingbird | The Almighty |
| October 8, 1989 | Bristol | England | The Studio | The Almighty |
| October 9, 1989 | London | England | Town and Country Club | The Almighty |
| October 10, 1989 | London | England | Town and Country Club | The Almighty |
| October 11, 1989 | London | England | Town and Country Club | The Almighty |
Oceania
| October 31, 1989 | Auckland | New Zealand | Powerstation | |
| November 1, 1989 | Auckland | New Zealand | Powerstation | |
| November 3, 1989 | Melbourne | Australia | The Palace Complex | |
| November 4, 1989 | Melbourne | Australia | The Palace Complex | |
| November 5, 1989 | Melbourne | Australia | The Palace Complex | |
| November 6, 1989 | Adelaide | Australia | Old Lion Hotel | |
| November 7, 1989 | Perth | Australia | Cargo's Niteclub | |
| November 9, 1989 | Sydney | Australia | Enmore Theatre | Ratcat |
| November 10, 1989 | Sydney | Australia | Hordern Pavilion | |
| November 11, 1989 | Sydney | Australia | Selina's Coogee Bay Hotel | |
| November 12, 1989 | Brisbane | Australia | Brisbane Festival Hall | |
Europe
| November 22, 1989 | Offenbach | West Germany | Stadthalle Offenbach | Ghost Dance; Plan B |
| November 23, 1989 | Bonn | West Germany | Biskuithalle | Ghost Dance; Plan B |
| November 24, 1989 | Oberhausen | West Germany | Music Circus Ruhr | Ghost Dance; Plan B |
| November 25, 1989 | Hamburg | West Germany | Docks | Ghost Dance; Plan B |
| November 26, 1989 | West Berlin | West Germany | Eissporthalle | Ghost Dance; Plan B |
| November 27, 1989 | West Berlin | West Germany | Eissporthalle | Ghost Dance; Plan B |
| November 28, 1989 | Bielefeld | West Germany | PC69 | Ghost Dance; Plan B |
| November 29, 1989 | Neumarkt | West Germany | Große Jurahalle | Ghost Dance; Plan B |
| November 30, 1989 | Böblingen | West Germany | Sporthalle | Ghost Dance; Plan B |
| December 1, 1989 | Deinze | Belgium | Brielpoort | Ghost Dance; The Saints |
| December 2, 1989 | Utrecht | Netherlands | Tivoli | Ghost Dance |
| December 3, 1989 | Rotterdam | Netherlands | Nighttown | Ghost Dance |
| December 4, 1989 | Amsterdam | Netherlands | Paradiso Grote Zaal | Ghost Dance |
North America
| December 12, 1989 | New Haven | United States | Toad's Place | The Innocence Mission |
| December 13, 1989 | Poughkeepsie | United States | The Chance | B.B. Blue and The Gargoyles |
| December 14, 1989 | Philadelphia | United States | Chestnut Cabaret | King Flux |
| December 15, 1989 | New York City | United States | The Ritz | Warzone; GBH |
| December 16, 1989 | New York City | United States | The Ritz | Warzone; GBH |

=== First setlist (Legs 1-5) ===
1. "Durango 95"
2. "Teenage Lobotomy"
3. "Psycho Therapy"
4. "Blitzkrieg Bop"
5. "Do You Remember Rock 'n' Roll Radio?"
6. "Bop Til' You Drop"
7. "Gimme Gimme Shock Treatment"
8. "Rock 'n' Roll High School"
9. "I Wanna Be Sedated"
10. "I Just Want to Have Something to Do" or "Beat on the Brat"
11. "Chinese Rock"
12. "Bonzo Goes To Bitburg"
13. "Go Mental"
14. "Sheena Is a Punk Rocker"
15. "Rockaway Beach"
16. "Here Today, Gone Tomorrow"
17. "Too Tough to Die" or "I Remember You"
18. "She's the One"
19. "Mama's Boy"
20. "Animal Boy"
21. "Wart Hog"
22. "Surfin' Bird" (The Trashmen cover)
23. "Cretin Hop"
24. "I Don't Wanna Walk Around with You"
25. "Today Your Love, Tomorrow the World"
26. "Pinhead"

Encore:

27. "I Wanna Live"
28. "Somebody Put Something in My Drink"
29. "Let's Dance" (Chris Montez cover)

Encore 2:

30. "Do You Want to Dance" (Bobby Freeman cover)
31. "Havana Affair"
32. "We're a Happy Family"

=== Second setlist (Legs 6-10) ===
1. "Durango 95"
2. "Teenage Lobotomy"
3. "Psycho Therapy"
4. "Blitzkrieg Bop"
5. "Do You Remember Rock 'n' Roll Radio?"
6. "I Believe in Miracles"
7. "Gimme Gimme Shock Treatment"
8. "Rock 'n' Roll High School"
9. "I Wanna Be Sedated"
10. "Beat on the Brat"
11. "I Wanna Live"
12. "Bonzo Goes to Bitburg"
13. "Go Mental"
14. "Sheena Is a Punk Rocker"
15. "Rockaway Beach"
16. "Pet Sematary"
17. "Don't Bust My Chops"
18. "She's the One"
19. "Mama's Boy"
20. "Animal Boy"
21. "Wart Hog"
22. "Surfin' Bird" (The Trashmen cover)
23. "Cretin Hop"
24. "I Don't Wanna Walk Around with You"
25. "Today Your Love, Tomorrow the World"
26. "Pinhead"

Encore:

27. "Chinese Rock"
28. "Somebody Put Something in My Drink"
29. "Let's Dance" (Chris Montez cover)

Encore 2:

30. "Do You Want to Dance" (Bobby Freeman cover)
31. "Palisades Park" (Freddy Cannon cover)
32. "We're a Happy Family"

== 1990 ==
| Date | City | Country | Venue | Opening act(s) |
North America
| February 23, 1990 | Trenton | United States | City Gardens | The Fiendz |
| February 24, 1990 | Sag Harbor | United States | Bay Street Theater | |
| February 25, 1990 | Cohoes | United States | Saratoga Winners | King Flux |
| March 1, 1990 | Charlottesville | United States | Unknown venue | |
| March 2, 1990 | Fredericksburg | United States | University of Mary Washington | N.Y. Citizens |
| March 3, 1990 | Emmitsburg | United States | Mount St. Mary's University | |
| March 4, 1990 | Reading | United States | The Silo | Anthrophobia; Irandaru |
| March 8, 1990 | Boston | United States | Citi Club | |
| March 9, 1990 | Boston | United States | Citi Club | |
| March 10, 1990 | Providence | United States | The Living Room | |
Europe
| March 22, 1990 | Copenhagen | Denmark | Pumpehuset | |
| March 23, 1990 | Tampere | Finland | Pakkahuone | |
| March 24, 1990 | Turku | Finland | Konserttitalo | |
| March 25, 1990 | Helsinki | Finland | Kulttuuritalo | |
| March 27, 1990 | Stockholm | Sweden | Globen Annexet | |
| March 28, 1990 | Gothenburg | Sweden | Nya Vågen | The Nomads |
| March 29, 1990 | Lund | Sweden | Mejeriet | The Nomads |
| March 30, 1990 | Karlskoga | Sweden | Bergslagshallen | The Nomads |
| March 31, 1990 | Hultsfred | Sweden | Hagadals Sportcentrum | The Nomads |
| April 1, 1990 | Oslo | Norway | Chateau Neuf | |
North America
| April 18, 1990 | Norman | United States | Oklahoma Memorial Union | Trouble |
| April 19, 1990 | Dallas | United States | Arcadia Theatre | Trouble |
| April 20, 1990 | Austin | United States | The Backroom | Trouble |
| April 21, 1990 | Austin | United States | The Backroom | Trouble |
| April 23, 1990 | New Orleans | United States | Tipitina's | Trouble |
| April 24, 1990 | Birmingham | United States | Sloss Furnaces | Trouble |
| April 26, 1990 | Miami Beach | United States | Club Nu | Trouble |
| April 27, 1990 | Melbourne | United States | Power Station | Trouble |
| April 28, 1990 | Ybor City | United States | The Cuban Club | Trouble |
| April 29, 1990 | Orlando | United States | Visage Nightclub | Trouble |
| May 1, 1990 | Atlanta | United States | The Masquerade | Trouble |
| May 2, 1990 | Nashville | United States | Cannery Ballroom | |
| May 4, 1990 | Winston-Salem | United States | Baity's | Slurpeeeee! |
| May 5, 1990 | Wilmington | United States | Mad Monk | Trouble |
| May 6, 1990 | Raleigh | United States | The Switch | Slurpeeeee! |
| May 8, 1990 | Columbia | United States | Greenstreets | Slurpeeeee! |
| May 9, 1990 | Charlotte | United States | 1313 Club | Slurpeeeee! |
| May 11, 1990 | Baltimore | United States | Hammerjack's | Trouble |
| May 12, 1990 | Norfolk | United States | The Boathouse | Trouble |
| May 13, 1990 | Richmond | United States | The Flood Zone | Trouble |
| May 14, 1990 | Washington, D.C. | United States | The Bayou | Trouble |
| May 15, 1990 | Washington, D.C. | United States | The Bayou | Trouble |
Europe
| June 23, 1990 | Sankt Goarshausen | West Germany | Freilichtbühne Loreley (Bizarre Festival) | —N/a |
Escape from New York Tour (with Debbie Harry, Tom Tom Club, and Jerry Harrison)
| June 28, 1990 | Columbia | United States | Merriweather Post Pavilion | —N/a |
| June 29, 1990 | Bristol | United States | Lake Compounce | —N/a |
| July 1, 1990 | Milwaukee | United States | Marcus Amphitheater (Summerfest) | —N/a |
| July 2, 1990 | Clarkston | United States | Pine Knob Music Theatre | —N/a |
| July 3, 1990 | Toronto | Canada | Kingswood Music Theatre | —N/a |
| July 4, 1990 | Montreal | Canada | La Ronde | —N/a |
| July 6, 1990 | Mansfield | United States | Great Woods Center For The Performing Arts | —N/a |
| July 7, 1990 | Portland | United States | Cumberland County Civic Center | —N/a |
| July 8, 1990 | Burlington | United States | Burlington Memorial Auditorium | —N/a |
| July 9, 1990 | Upper Darby Township | United States | Tower Theater | —N/a |
| July 11, 1990 | Jones Beach | United States | Jones Beach Theater | —N/a |
| July 12, 1990 | Holmdel | United States | Garden State Arts Center | —N/a |
| July 13, 1990 | Darien | United States | Lakeside Amphitheater | —N/a |
| July 14, 1990 | Cleveland | United States | Nautica Stage | —N/a |
| July 16, 1990 | Grove City | United States | Capital Music Center | —N/a |
| July 17, 1990 | Tinley Park | United States | World Music Theatre | —N/a |
| July 18, 1990 | Mason | United States | Timberwolf Amphitheater | —N/a |
| July 19, 1990 | Atlanta | United States | Coca-Cola Lakewood Amphitheatre | —N/a |
| July 22, 1990 | St. Louis | United States | Fox Theatre | —N/a |
| July 23, 1990 | Memphis | United States | Mud Island Amphitheater | —N/a |
| July 24, 1990 | Kansas City | United States | Sandstone Amphitheater | —N/a |
| July 25, 1990 | Tulsa | United States | River Parks Amphitheater | —N/a |
| July 26, 1990 | Dallas | United States | Fair Park Bandshell | —N/a |
| July 27, 1990 | Houston | United States | University of Houston | —N/a |
| July 28, 1990 | Austin | United States | Auditorium Shores (Austin Aqua Festival) | —N/a |
| July 30, 1990 | Santa Fe | United States | Paolo Soleri Amphitheater | —N/a |
| July 31, 1990 | Greenwood Village | United States | Fiddler's Green Amphitheatre | —N/a |
| August 1, 1990 | Park City | United States | Park West | —N/a |
| August 2, 1990 | Irvine | United States | Irvine Meadows Amphitheatre | —N/a |
| August 4, 1990 | San Diego | United States | SDSU Open Air Theatre | —N/a |
| August 5, 1990 | Las Vegas | United States | The Artemus W. Ham Concert Hall | —N/a |
| August 6, 1990 | Mesa | United States | Mesa Amphitheatre | —N/a |
| August 8, 1990 | Los Angeles | United States | Greek Theatre | —N/a |
| August 9, 1990 | Los Angeles | United States | Greek Theatre | —N/a |
| August 10, 1990 | Ventura | United States | Ventura Theatre | —N/a |
| August 11, 1990 | Berkeley | United States | William Randolph Hearst Greek Theatre | —N/a |
| August 12, 1990 | San Francisco | United States | Warfield Theatre | —N/a |
| August 14, 1990 | Portland | United States | Arlene Schnitzer Concert Hall | —N/a |
| August 15, 1990 | Seattle | Paramount Theatre | | —N/a |
| August 16, 1990 | Victoria | Canada | Victoria Memorial Arena | —N/a |
| August 17, 1990 | Vancouver | Canada | PNE Exhibition Bowl | |
Asia
| September 3, 1990 | Osaka | Japan | Moda Hall | —N/a |
| September 4, 1990 | Nagoya | Japan | Nagoya Club Quattro | —N/a |
| September 5, 1990 | Kawasaki | Japan | Club Citta | Toy Boys |
| September 6, 1990 | Kawasaki | Japan | Club Citta | |
| September 8, 1990 | Nagoya | Japan | Nagoya Club Quattro | |
| September 9, 1990 | Nagoya | Japan | Nagoya Club Quattro | |
| September 10, 1990 | Osaka | Japan | Moda Hall | |
| September 11, 1990 | Osaka | Japan | Moda Hall | |
| September 13, 1990 | Kawasaki | Japan | Club Citta | |
| September 14, 1990 | Kawasaki | Japan | Club Citta | |
| September 15, 1990 | Kawasaki | Japan | Club Citta | |
| September 16, 1990 | Kawasaki | Japan | Club Citta | |
North America
| October 4, 1990 | Philadelphia | United States | Chestnut Cabaret | Norman Bates & The Showerheads |
| October 5, 1990 | Baltimore | United States | Hammerjack's | |
| October 6, 1990 | New York City | United States | The Ritz | Manitoba's Wild Kingdom |
| October 7, 1990 | Trenton | United States | City Gardens | The Raging Lamos |
Europe
| November 13, 1990 | Paris | France | Le Petit Olympia | |
| November 14, 1990 | Munich | Germany | Circus Krone | |
| November 15, 1990 | Völklingen | Germany | Sporthalle | |
| November 16, 1990 | Bremen | Germany | Stadhalle | |
| November 17, 1990 | Ghent | Belgium | 't Kuipke | The Godfathers |
| November 19, 1990 | Lyon | France | La Bourse du Travail | |
| November 20, 1990 | Zürich | Switzerland | Volkshaus | |
| November 21, 1990 | Vienna | Austria | Bank-Austria Zelt | |
| November 22, 1990 | Graz | Austria | Orpheum | Remnant |
| November 24, 1990 | Zagreb | Yugoslavia | Dom Sportova | |
| November 25, 1990 | Ljubljana | Yugoslavia | Tivoli Hall | |
| November 26, 1990 | Milan | Italy | Rolling Stone | U.K. Subs |
| November 27, 1990 | Rimini | Italy | Slego | |
| November 29, 1990 | Zaragoza | Spain | Pabellón Francés | BB sin Sed |
| November 30, 1990 | Madrid | Spain | Pabellón de la Ciudad Deportiva del Real Madrid | BB sin Sed |
| December 1, 1990 | Barcelona | Spain | Palau dels Esports | BB sin Sed |
| December 2, 1990 | San Sebastián | Spain | Velódromo de Anoeta | BB sin Sed |
| December 4, 1990 | Valencia | Spain | Arena Auditorium | BB sin Sed |
| December 5, 1990 | Murcia | Spain | Snoopy | |
| December 7, 1990 | Manchester | England | International 2 | Metal Monkey Machine |
| December 8, 1990 | London | England | Brixton Academy | Crazyhead; Drum |
North America
| December 27, 1990 | Providence | United States | Campus Club | |
| December 28, 1990 | Boston | United States | Citi Club | |
| December 29, 1990 | New York City | United States | The Ritz | Lunachicks |
| December 30, 1990 | New Haven | United States | Toad's Place | Lunachicks |

=== First setlist (Legs 1-5) ===
1. "Durango 95"
2. "Teenage Lobotomy"
3. "Psycho Therapy"
4. "Blitzkrieg Bop"
5. "Do You Remember Rock 'n' Roll Radio?"
6. "I Believe in Miracles"
7. "Gimme Gimme Shock Treatment"
8. "Rock 'n' Roll High School"
9. "I Wanna Be Sedated"
10. "Beat on the Brat"
11. "I Wanna Live"
12. "Bonzo Goes to Bitburg"
13. "Go Mental"
14. "Sheena Is a Punk Rocker"
15. "Rockaway Beach"
16. "Pet Sematary"
17. "Don't Bust My Chops"
18. "She's the One"
19. "Mama's Boy"
20. "Animal Boy"
21. "Wart Hog"
22. "Surfin' Bird" (The Trashmen cover)
23. "Cretin Hop"
24. "I Don't Wanna Walk Around with You"
25. "Today Your Love, Tomorrow the World"
26. "Pinhead"

Encore:

27. "Chinese Rock"
28. "Somebody Put Something in My Drink"
29. "California Sun" (Joe Jones cover)

Encore 2:

30. "Ignorance Is Bliss"
31. "Judy Is a Punk"
32. "We're a Happy Family"

=== Second setlist (Legs 6-9) ===
1. "Durango 95"
2. "Teenage Lobotomy"
3. "Psycho Therapy"
4. "Blitzkrieg Bop"
5. "Do You Remember Rock 'n' Roll Radio?"
6. "I Believe in Miracles"
7. "Gimme Gimme Shock Treatment"
8. "Rock 'n' Roll High School"
9. "I Wanna Be Sedated"
10. "Beat on the Brat" (Replaced by "The KKK Took My Baby Away" on Leg 9)
11. "I Wanna Live"
12. "Bonzo Goes to Bitburg"
13. "Commando"
14. "Sheena Is a Punk Rocker"
15. "Rockaway Beach"
16. "Pet Sematary"
17. "53rd & 3rd"
18. "Now I Wanna Sniff Some Glue"
19. "Mama's Boy"
20. "Animal Boy"
21. "Wart Hog"
22. "Surfin' Bird" (The Trashmen cover)
23. "Cretin Hop"
24. "I Don't Wanna Walk Around with You"
25. "Today Your Love, Tomorrow the World"
26. "Pinhead"

Encore:

27. "Chinese Rock"
28. "Somebody Put Something in My Drink"
29. "We're a Happy Family"

Encore 2:

30. "I Just Want to Have Something to Do"
31. "California Sun" (Joe Jones cover)
32. "Judy Is a Punk"

== 1991 ==
| Date | City | Country | Venue | Opening act(s) |
Oceania
| January 22, 1991 | Gold Coast | Australia | The Playroom | Hard-Ons |
| January 23, 1991 | Byron Bay | Australia | The Piggery Arts Factory | Hard-Ons |
| January 25, 1991 | Brisbane | Australia | Brisbane Festival Hall | Hard-Ons; The New Christs |
| January 26, 1991 | Sydney | Australia | Hordern Pavilion | Hard-Ons; The New Christs |
| January 27, 1991 | Wollongong | Australia | Waves Wollongong | Hard-Ons; The New Christs |
| January 29, 1991 | Dee Why | Australia | Dee Why Hotel | —N/a |
| January 31, 1991 | Adelaide | Australia | Thebarton Theatre | Hard-Ons |
| February 1, 1991 | Melbourne | Australia | Festival Hall | Hard-Ons; The New Christs |
| February 2, 1991 | Perth | Australia | Robinson Pavilion | Ratcat |
Asia
| February 5, 1991 | Kawasaki | Japan | Club Citta | —N/a |
| February 6, 1991 | Tokyo | Japan | Tokiwa-za Tokyo | —N/a |
| February 7, 1991 | Tokyo | Japan | Tokiwa-za Tokyo | —N/a |
Europe
| March 6, 1991 | Madrid | Spain | Pabellón de la Ciudad Deportiva del Real Madrid | —N/a |
| March 7, 1991 | Oviedo | Spain | La Real | Numeros Rojos |
| March 8, 1991 | Valladolid | Spain | Polideportivo Huerta del Rey | —N/a |
| March 9, 1991 | Vigo | Spain | Centro Deportivo Municipal das Travesas | —N/a |
| March 11, 1991 | Barcelona | Spain | Zeleste (Recording for Loco Live) | Numeros Rojos |
| March 12, 1991 | Barcelona | Spain | Zeleste (Recording for Loco Live) | Numeros Rojos |
| March 13, 1991 | Valencia | Spain | Arena Auditorium | —N/a |
| March 15, 1991 | Pamplona | Spain | Sala Ilargi | —N/a |
| March 16, 1991 | Mondragón | Spain | Pabellón Zubi-Alde | —N/a |
| March 17, 1991 | Bergara | Spain | Sala Txibisto | —N/a |
| March 18, 1991 | Melgar de Fernamental | Spain | Sala Vegas 2 | —N/a |
North America
| April 4, 1991 | New Haven | United States | Toad's Place | Saigon Kick |
| April 5, 1991 | Philadelphia | United States | Chestnut Cabaret | Saigon Kick |
| April 6, 1991 | Baltimore | United States | Hammerjack's | Saigon Kick |
| April 12, 1991 | Allentown | United States | Airport Road Music Hall | Psycho Nurse |
| April 13, 1991 | Columbus | United States | Newport Music Hall | Loudhouse |
| April 14, 1991 | Detroit | United States | Club X | The Toll |
| April 15, 1991 | Cincinnati | United States | Bogart's | The Dickies |
| April 16, 1991 | Pittsburgh | United States | Metropol | Psycho Nurse |
South America
| April 26, 1991 | Buenos Aires | Argentina | Estadio Obras Sanitarias | Los Violadores |
| April 27, 1991 | Buenos Aires | Argentina | Estadio Obras Sanitarias | Los Violadores |
| April 28, 1991 | Buenos Aires | Argentina | Estadio Obras Sanitarias | Los Violadores |
| April 30, 1991 | São Paulo | Brazil | Dama XOC | Ratos de Porão |
| May 1, 1991 | São Paulo | Brazil | Dama XOC | Ratos de Porão |
| May 2, 1991 | São Paulo | Brazil | Dama XOC | Ratos de Porão |
| May 4, 1991 | Porto Alegre | Brazil | Gigantinho | Justa Causa |
North America
| May 28, 1991 | New Haven | United States | Toad's Place | —N/a |
| May 29, 1991 | Trenton | United States | City Gardens | —N/a |
| May 30, 1991 | New Britain | United States | The Sting | The Toll |
| May 31, 1991 | Spring Valley | United States | World Stage | —N/a |
| June 1, 1991 | Asbury Park | United States | Fastlane 2 | The Toll Backseat |
| June 7, 1991 | Ybor City | United States | Ritz Theatre | —N/a |
| June 8, 1991 | Miami Beach | United States | Cameo Theatre | —N/a |
| June 9, 1991 | Orlando | United States | Visage Nightclub | Potential Frenzy |
| June 11, 1991 | Atlanta | United States | The Masquerade | The Tombstones |
| June 12, 1991 | Charlotte | United States | 1313 Club | —N/a |
| June 14, 1991 | Raleigh | United States | Showcase Concert Hall | —N/a |
| June 15, 1991 | Winston-Salem | United States | Baity's Backstreet Music Garden | —N/a |
| June 16, 1991 | Greenville | United States | Character's Nightlife | —N/a |
| June 18, 1991 | Athens | United States | Georgia Theatre | —N/a |
| June 19, 1991 | Knoxville | United States | Bijou Theatre | —N/a |
| June 21, 1991 | Norfolk | United States | The Boathouse | Left Wing Fascists |
| June 22, 1991 | Richmond | United States | The Flood Zone | —N/a |
| June 23, 1991 | Washington, D.C. | United States | The Bayou | —N/a |
Europe
| July 6, 1991 | La Spezia | Italy | Stadio Comunale Alberto Picco | Litfiba |
| July 8, 1991 | Turin | Italy | Stadio Comunale Vittorio Pozzo | —N/a |
| July 10, 1991 | Leysin | Switzerland | Centre des Sports (Leysin Festival) | —N/a |
Canada
| August 6, 1991 | Toronto | Canada | Kingswood Music Theatre | —N/a |
| August 8, 1991 | Kitchener | Canada | Bingeman Park | Teenage Head |
| August 9, 1991 | Toronto | Canada | The Spectrum | —N/a |
| August 10, 1991 | Bala | Canada | The KEE to Bala | —N/a |
| August 11, 1991 | London | Canada | Kiplings | —N/a |
| August 13, 1991 | Montreal | Canada | Rialto Theatre | Asexuals |
| August 14, 1991 | Ottawa | Canada | Barrymore's | The Pariahs |
| August 15, 1991 | St. Catharines | Canada | The Hideaway | —N/a |
| August 16, 1991 | Hamilton | Canada | Bannister's | Teenage Head |
Europe
| August 24, 1991 | Berlin | Germany | Freilichtbühne Wuhlheide (Bizarre Festival) | —N/a |
| August 25, 1991 | Hasselt | Belgium | Domein Kiewit (Pukkelpop) | —N/a |
| August 27, 1991 | Helsinki | Finland | Helsinki Ice Hall | Iggy Pop; The Nomads |
| August 28, 1991 | Stockholm | Sweden | Hovet | Iggy Pop; The Nomads |
North America
| October 4, 1991 | Trenton | United States | City Gardens | Ween |
| October 5, 1991 | Philadelphia | United States | Chestnut Cabaret | Youth Gone Mad |
| October 6, 1991 | Middletown | United States | The Class | —N/a |
| October 7, 1991 | Northampton | United States | Pearl Street | —N/a |
| October 11, 1991 | Warwick | United States | Rocky Point Palladium | —N/a |
| October 14, 1991 | Cleveland | United States | Empire Concert Club | —N/a |
| October 15, 1991 | Columbus | United States | Newport Music Hall | —N/a |
| October 16, 1991 | Pittsburgh | United States | Metropol | Psycho Nurse |
| October 18, 1991 | Baltimore | United States | Hammerjack's | —N/a |
| October 19, 1991 | Washington, D.C. | United States | The Bayou | —N/a |
| October 24, 1991 | Boston | United States | The Channel | Voodoo Dolls |
| October 25, 1991 | New Britain | United States | The Sting | The Reducers |
| October 26, 1991 | Sea Bright | United States | Tradewinds | —N/a |
Europe
| November 25, 1991 | Utrecht | Netherlands | Muziekcentrum Vredenburg | —N/a |
| November 27, 1991 | Hamburg | Germany | Docks | —N/a |
| November 28, 1991 | Düsseldorf | Germany | Tor 3 | —N/a |
| November 29, 1991 | Deinze | Belgium | Brielpoort | Belgian Asociality |
| November 30, 1991 | Rennes | France | Salle Omnisports | The Raunch Hands; Sex Tattoo |
| December 2, 1991 | Birmingham | England | The Hummingbird | The Honey Thieves |
| December 3, 1991 | Newcastle | England | Newcastle Polytechnic | The Honey Thieves |
| December 4, 1991 | Glasgow | Scotland | Barrowland Ballroom | —N/a |
| December 5, 1991 | Manchester | England | University of Manchester | The Honey Thieves |
| December 7, 1991 | London | England | Brixton Academy | Co-headlining with: The Damned; Supported by: The Honey Thieves |
| December 8, 1991 | London | England | Brixton Academy | Co-headlining with: The Damned; Supported by: The Honey Thieves |
North America
| December 27, 1991 | New Haven | United States | Toad's Place | Blitzspeer |
| December 28, 1991 | Baltimore | United States | Hammerjack's | —N/a |
| December 29, 1991 | New York City | United States | The Ritz | Lunachicks |

=== Typical setlist ===
1. "Durango 95"
2. "Teenage Lobotomy"
3. "Psycho Therapy"
4. "Blitzkrieg Bop"
5. "Do You Remember Rock 'n' Roll Radio?"
6. "I Believe in Miracles"
7. "Gimme Gimme Shock Treatment"
8. "Rock 'n' Roll High School"
9. "I Wanna Be Sedated"
10. "The KKK Took My Baby Away"
11. "I Wanna Live"
12. "Bonzo Goes to Bitburg"
13. "Commando"
14. "Sheena Is a Punk Rocker"
15. "Rockaway Beach"
16. "Pet Sematary"
17. "53rd & 3rd" or "Too Tough to Die"
18. "Glad to See You Go"
19. "Mama's Boy"
20. "Animal Boy"
21. "Wart Hog"
22. "Surfin' Bird" (The Trashmen cover)
23. "Cretin Hop"
24. "I Don't Wanna Walk Around with You"
25. "Today Your Love, Tomorrow the World"
26. "Pinhead"

Encore:

27. "Chinese Rock"
28. "Somebody Put Something in My Drink"
29. "We're a Happy Family"

Encore 2:

30. "Beat on the Brat"
31. "California Sun" (Joe Jones cover) or "Judy Is a Punk"
32. "Judy Is a Punk" or "California Sun" (Joe Jones cover)

== 1992 ==
| Date | City | Country | Venue | Supporting act(s) |
Europe
| March 14, 1992 | Fontanafredda | Italy | Palasport | —N/a |
| March 15, 1992 | Florence | Italy | Auditorium Flog | —N/a |
| March 16, 1992 | Milan | Italy | Rolling Stone | —N/a |
| March 17, 1992 | Correggio | Italy | Palasport | —N/a |
| March 19, 1992 | Athens | Greece | Rodon Club | Yeah! |
| March 20, 1992 | Athens | Greece | Rodon Club | Yeah! |
| March 21, 1992 | Athens | Greece | Rodon Club | Yeah! |
North America
| April 9, 1992 | New Haven | United States | Toad's Place | Blitzspeer |
| April 10, 1992 | New York City | United States | Roone Arledge Auditorium | Action Swingers |
| April 11, 1992 | Sea Bright | United States | Tradewinds | Blitzspeer |
| April 12, 1992 | Trenton | United States | City Gardens | Blitzspeer |
| April 23, 1992 | Baltimore | United States | Hammerjack's | —N/a |
| April 24, 1992 | Norfolk | United States | The Boathouse | —N/a |
| April 25, 1992 | Washington, D.C. | United States | Unknown venue | —N/a |
| April 26, 1992 | Allentown | United States | Airport Road Music Hall | The Toll Third from the Sun |
Europe
| May 3, 1992 | Bourges | France | Pavillon | The Pogues |
| May 4, 1992 | Lyon | France | Le Transbordeur | —N/a |
| May 5, 1992 | Paris | France | Élysée Montmartre | —N/a |
| May 6, 1992 | Paris | France | Élysée Montmartre | —N/a |
| May 7, 1992 | Mulhouse | France | Le Phoenix | —N/a |
| May 9, 1992 | Pau | France | Hippodrome | —N/a |
| May 10, 1992 | Niort | France | Parc de Noron | —N/a |
North America
| June 4, 1992 | Kitchener | Canada | Stages | The Toll |
| June 5, 1992 | Oshawa | Canada | Unknown venue | —N/a |
| June 6, 1992 | Hamilton | Canada | Legends | The Toll |
| June 7, 1992 | London | Canada | Unknown venue | —N/a |
| June 9, 1992 | Toronto | Canada | RPM Club | Forgotten Rebels |
| June 10, 1992 | Toronto | Canada | RPM Club | Forgotten Rebels |
| June 12, 1992 | Quebec City | Canada | Salle Jean-Paul-Tardif | —N/a |
| June 13, 1992 | Ottawa | Canada | Porter Hall | The Toll |
| June 14, 1992 | Montreal | Canada | La Brique | The Toll |
Europe
| June 19, 1992 | Kauhajoki | Finland | Nurmijärvi (Nummirock) | —N/a |
| June 27, 1992 | Alsdorf | Germany | Freizeitpark (Bizarre Festival) | —N/a |
Europe
| ~~July 16, 1992~~ | Girona | Spain | Les Casernes | Plumons Negres; Barri Baix |
| ~~July 18, 1992~~ | Huesca | Spain | Plaza de Toros de Huesca | —N/a |
| ~~July 25, 1992~~ | Madrid | Spain | Campo Municipal Magallanes | Porretas |
Latin America
| September 13, 1992 | Santiago | Chile | Velódromo Estadio Nacional | Fiskales Ad-Hok |
| September 16, 1992 | Buenos Aires | Argentina | Estadio Obras Sanitarias | Todos Tus Muertos |
| September 17, 1992 | Buenos Aires | Argentina | Estadio Obras Sanitarias | Todos Tus Muertos |
| September 18, 1992 | Buenos Aires | Argentina | Estadio Obras Sanitarias | Todos Tus Muertos |
| September 19, 1992 | Buenos Aires | Argentina | Estadio Obras Sanitarias | Todos Tus Muertos |
| September 22, 1992 | São Paulo | Brazil | Olympia | Ratos de Porão |
| September 23, 1992 | Rio de Janeiro | Brazil | Canecão | —N/a |
| September 26, 1992 | Mexico City | Mexico | Ex-Balneario Olímpico Pantitlán | Aguelarre YAPS |
| September 27, 1992 | Mexico City | Mexico | Ex-Balneario Olímpico Pantitlán | Paciom Rebel'd |
North America
| October 6, 1992 | Vancouver | Canada | Commodore Ballroom | Overwhelming Colorfast |
| October 7, 1992 | Seattle | United States | Paramount Theatre | Co-headlining with: Social Distortion; Supported by: Overwhelming Colorfast |
| October 8, 1992 | Portland | United States | Roseland Theater | Co-headlining with: Social Distortion; Supported by: Overwhelming Colorfast |
| October 10, 1992 | Berkeley | United States | William Randolph Hearst Greek Theatre | Co-headlining with: Social Distortion; Supported by: Overwhelming Colorfast |
| October 11, 1992 | Davis | United States | Freeborn Hall | Co-headlining with: Social Distortion; Supported by: Overwhelming Colorfast |
| October 12, 1992 | Isla Vista | United States | Anaconda Theatre | Overwhelming Colorfast |
| October 14, 1992 | Los Angeles | United States | Hollywood Palladium | House of Pain; Overwhelming Colorfast |
| October 15, 1992 | Los Angeles | United States | Hollywood Palladium | House of Pain; Overwhelming Colorfast |
| October 16, 1992 | Los Angeles | United States | Hollywood Palladium | House of Pain; Big Drill Car |
| October 17, 1992 | San Diego | United States | Starlight Bowl | Co-headlining with: Social Distortion; Supported by: Overwhelming Colorfast |
| October 18, 1992 | Mesa | United States | Mesa Amphitheatre | Co-headlining with: Social Distortion; Supported by: Overwhelming Colorfast |
| October 21, 1992 | Dallas | United States | Bronco Bowl | Co-headlining with: Social Distortion; Supported by: Overwhelming Colorfast |
| October 22, 1992 | Austin | United States | Palmer Auditorium | Co-headlining with: Social Distortion; Supported by: Overwhelming Colorfast |
| October 23, 1992 | Houston | United States | The Unicorn | Co-headlining with: Social Distortion; Supported by: Overwhelming Colorfast |
| October 24, 1992 | New Orleans | United States | State Palace Theatre | Co-headlining with: Social Distortion; Supported by: Overwhelming Colorfast |
| October 26, 1992 | Atlanta | United States | International Ballroom | Co-headlining with: Social Distortion; Supported by: Overwhelming Colorfast |
| October 28, 1992 | Detroit | United States | State Theater | Co-headlining with: Social Distortion; Supported by: Overwhelming Colorfast |
| October 29, 1992 | Columbus | United States | Newport Music Hall | Co-headlining with: Social Distortion; Supported by: Overwhelming Colorfast |
| October 30, 1992 | Milwaukee | United States | Riverside Theater | Co-headlining with: Social Distortion; Supported by: Overwhelming Colorfast |
| October 31, 1992 | Chicago | United States | Aragon Ballroom | Co-headlining with: Social Distortion; Supported by: Overwhelming Colorfast |
| November 2, 1992 | Cleveland | United States | Public Auditorium | Co-headlining with: Social Distortion; Supported by: Overwhelming Colorfast |
| November 3, 1992 | Cincinnati | United States | Bogart's | Co-headlining with: Social Distortion; Supported by: Overwhelming Colorfast |
| November 4, 1992 | Big Rapids | United States | Williams Auditorium | Co-headlining with: Social Distortion; Supported by: Overwhelming Colorfast |
| November 6, 1992 | Pittsburgh | United States | Skibo Ballroom | Co-headlining with: Social Distortion; Supported by: Overwhelming Colorfast |
| November 7, 1992 | Baltimore | United States | Hammerjack's | Co-headlining with: Social Distortion; Supported by: Overwhelming Colorfast |
| November 8, 1992 | Providence | United States | Johnson & Wales University | Co-headlining with: Social Distortion; Supported by: Overwhelming Colorfast |
| November 10, 1992 | New York City | United States | Roseland Ballroom | Co-headlining with: Social Distortion; Supported by: Overwhelming Colorfast |
| November 11, 1992 | New York City | United States | Roseland Ballroom | Co-headlining with: Social Distortion; Supported by: Overwhelming Colorfast |
| November 13, 1992 | Boston | United States | Orpheum Theatre | Co-headlining with: Social Distortion; Supported by: Overwhelming Colorfast |
Europe
| November 26, 1992 | Munich | Germany | Rudi-Sedlmayer-Halle | Jingo de Lunch |
| November 27, 1992 | Stuttgart | Germany | Messe Congress Centrum B | Jingo de Lunch |
| November 29, 1992 | Leipzig | Germany | Haus Auensee | Jingo de Lunch |
| December 1, 1992 | Erlangen | Germany | Stadthalle Erlangen | Jingo de Lunch |
| December 2, 1992 | Offenbach am Main | Germany | Stadthalle Offenbach | Jingo de Lunch |
| December 3, 1992 | Freiburg im Breisgau | Germany | Stadthalle Freiburg | Jingo de Lunch |
| December 5, 1992 | Cologne | Germany | Sporthalle | Jingo de Lunch |
| December 6, 1992 | Hanover | Germany | Music Hall | Jingo de Lunch |
| December 7, 1992 | Berlin | Germany | Die Halle | Jingo de Lunch |
| December 8, 1992 | Hamburg | Germany | Alsterdorfer Sporthalle | Jingo de Lunch |
| December 10, 1992 | Groningen | Netherlands | De Oosterpoort | —N/a |
| December 11, 1992 | Rotterdam | Netherlands | Nighttown | —N/a |
| December 13, 1992 | Bristol | England | Bristol Rainbow | Terrorvision |
| December 14, 1992 | Birmingham | England | The Hummingbird | Terrorvision |
| December 15, 1992 | Nottingham | England | Rock City | Terrorvision |
| December 17, 1992 | Glasgow | Scotland | Barrowland Ballroom | Terrorvision |
| December 18, 1992 | Manchester | England | Manchester Academy | Terrorvision |
| December 19, 1992 | Leeds | England | Town and Country Club | Terrorvision |
| December 20, 1992 | London | England | Brixton Academy | Terrorvision |

=== First setlist (Legs 1-5) ===
1. "Durango 95"
2. "Teenage Lobotomy"
3. "Psycho Therapy"
4. "Blitzkrieg Bop"
5. "Do You Remember Rock 'n' Roll Radio?"
6. "I Believe in Miracles"
7. "Gimme Gimme Shock Treatment"
8. "Rock 'n' Roll High School"
9. "I Wanna Be Sedated"
10. "Beat on the Brat"
11. "I Wanna Live"
12. "Bonzo Goes to Bitburg"
13. "Commando"
14. "Sheena Is a Punk Rocker"
15. "Rockaway Beach"
16. "Pet Sematary"
17. "I Wanna Be Well"
18. "Glad to See You Go"
19. "Mama's Boy"
20. "Animal Boy"
21. "Wart Hog"
22. "Surfin' Bird" (The Trashmen cover)
23. "Cretin Hop"
24. "I Don't Wanna Walk Around with You"
25. "Today Your Love, Tomorrow the World"
26. "Pinhead"

Encore:

27. "Chinese Rock"
28. "Somebody Put Something in My Drink"
29. "We're a Happy Family"

Encore 2:

30. "Strength to Endure"
31. "I Just Want to Have Something to Do" or "Havana Affair"
32. "Judy Is a Punk"

=== Second setlist (Legs 6-8) ===
1. "Durango 95"
2. "Teenage Lobotomy"
3. "Psycho Therapy"
4. "Blitzkrieg Bop"
5. "Do You Remember Rock 'n' Roll Radio?"
6. "I Believe in Miracles"
7. "Gimme Gimme Shock Treatment"
8. "Rock 'n' Roll High School"
9. "I Wanna Be Sedated"
10. "Censorshit"
11. "I Wanna Live"
12. "Bonzo Goes to Bitburg"
13. "Tomorrow She Goes Away"
14. "Sheena Is a Punk Rocker"
15. "Rockaway Beach"
16. "Pet Sematary"
17. "I Wanna Be Well"
18. "Glad to See You Go"
19. "Take It as It Comes" (The Doors cover)
20. "Somebody Put Something in My Drink"
21. "Commando"
22. "Wart Hog"
23. "Cretin Hop"
24. "Judy Is a Punk"
25. "Today Your Love, Tomorrow the World"
26. "Pinhead"

Encore:

27. "Poison Heart"
28. "Chinese Rock"
29. "We're a Happy Family"

Encore 2:

30. "Strength to Endure"
31. "Beat on the Brat"
32. "California Sun" (Joe Jones cover)

== 1993 ==
| Date | City | Country | Venue | Opening act(s) |
Asia
| January 9, 1993 | Tokyo | Japan | Nakano Sun Plaza | —N/a |
| January 10, 1993 | Kawasaki | Japan | Club Citta | —N/a |
| January 11, 1993 | Tokyo | Japan | Tokyo Yubin Chokin Hall | —N/a |
| January 12, 1993 | Tokyo | Japan | Tokyo Yubin Chokin Hall | —N/a |
| January 14, 1993 | Nagoya | Japan | Diamond Hall | —N/a |
| January 15, 1993 | Nagoya | Japan | Diamond Hall | —N/a |
| January 17, 1993 | Osaka | Japan | Matsushita IMP Hall | —N/a |
| January 18, 1993 | Osaka | Japan | Matsushita IMP Hall | —N/a |
Europe
| February 21, 1993 | Paris | France | Élysée Montmartre | Teasin' Babes |
| February 22, 1993 | Paris | France | Élysée Montmartre | Shitbone |
| February 23, 1993 | Cabourg | France | Hippodrome | —N/a |
| February 24, 1993 | Dijon | France | Le Forum | —N/a |
| February 26, 1993 | Grenoble | France | Le Summum | —N/a |
| February 27, 1993 | Toulouse | France | Le Dock | —N/a |
| February 28, 1993 | Bordeaux | France | Theatre Barbey | —N/a |
| March 2, 1993 | Palma de Mallorca | Spain | Palacio de Congresos | Skyline / The Last Gang |
| March 3, 1993 | Santomera | Spain | Discoteca el Límite | Hangar 18 / The Last Gang |
| March 5, 1993 | Gran Canaria | Spain | Polideportivo | The Last Gang |
| March 6, 1993 | Solsona | Spain | Disco Xelsa | —N/a |
| March 8, 1993 | Madrid | Spain | Sala Canciller | Hangar 18 + The Last Gang |
| March 9, 1993 | Madrid | Spain | Sala Canciller | Hangar 18 + The Last Gang |
| March 10, 1993 | Melgar de Fernamental | Spain | Sala Vegas 2 | —N/a |
| March 11, 1993 | A Coruña | Spain | Coliseum da Coruña | —N/a |
| March 15, 1993 | Barcelona | Spain | Zeleste | Hangar 18 The Last Gang |
| March 16, 1993 | Barcelona | Spain | Zeleste | Hangar 18 The Last Gang |
| March 18, 1993 | Girona | Spain | Palau de Fires | Hangar 18 The Last Gang |
| March 19, 1993 | Zaragoza | Spain | Carpa de la Chimenea | Hangar 18 The Last Gang |
| March 20, 1993 | San Sebastián | Spain | Polideportivo Anoeta | Hangar 18 The Last Gang |
North America
| April 15, 1993 | Danbury | United States | Unknown venue | —N/a |
| April 16, 1993 | Poughkeepsie | United States | The Chance | Outcrowd |
| April 17, 1993 | Trenton | United States | City Gardens | Outcrowd |
| April 22, 1993 | Providence | United States | Donovan Dining Center | —N/a |
| April 23, 1993 | New Haven | United States | Unknown venue | —N/a |
| April 24, 1993 | Syracuse | United States | Skytop Field | Screaming Trees; Shinehead |
| April 28, 1993 | Allentown | United States | Zodiac Club | End Zone |
| April 29, 1993 | Baltimore | United States | Hammerjack's | Bob Geldof and the Happy Clubsters |
| April 30, 1993 | College Park | United States | McKeldin Library (Free concert) | —N/a |
| May 1, 1993 | Scriba | United States | Bayshore Grove (Springfest) | —N/a |
Europe
| May 5, 1993 | Athens | Greece | Rodon Club | Panx Romana |
| May 6, 1993 | Athens | Greece | Rodon Club | Panx Romana |
| May 7, 1993 | Athens | Greece | Rodon Club | Panx Romana |
| May 9, 1993 | Florence | Italy | Auditorium Flog | —N/a |
| May 10, 1993 | Spilimbergo | Italy | Rototom | —N/a |
| May 11, 1993 | Turin | Italy | Big Club | —N/a |
| May 13, 1993 | Gualtieri | Italy | Il Tempo Discothèque | —N/a |
| May 14, 1993 | Rome | Italy | Teatro Tendastrisce | —N/a |
| May 15, 1993 | Macerata | Italy | Palasport | —N/a |
| May 16, 1993 | Milan | Italy | Rolling Stone | Senzabenza |
| May 18, 1993 | Palma de Mallorca | Spain | Hipódromo de Son Pardo | Skyline |
| May 19, 1993 | Oviedo | Spain | Estadio Carlos Tartiere | Opening for: U2 |
| May 22, 1993 | Madrid | Spain | Vicente Calderón Stadium | Opening for: U2 |
Latin America
| June 25, 1993 | Buenos Aires | Argentina | Estadio Obras Sanitarias | Massacre |
| June 26, 1993 | Buenos Aires | Argentina | Estadio Obras Sanitarias | Massacre |
| June 27, 1993 | Buenos Aires | Argentina | Estadio Obras Sanitarias | Massacre |
| June 28, 1993 | Buenos Aires | Argentina | Estadio Obras Sanitarias | Massacre |
| June 29, 1993 | Buenos Aires | Argentina | Estadio Obras Sanitarias | Massacre |
| July 2, 1993 | Mexico City | Mexico | Gimnasio Olímpico Juan de la Barrera | —N/a |
| July 3, 1993 | Mexico City | Mexico | Gimnasio Olímpico Juan de la Barrera | —N/a |
North America
| July 22, 1993 | Providence | United States | Lupo's Heartbreak Hotel | —N/a |
| July 24, 1993 | New York City | United States | The Academy | Dig; Angelfish |
| July 26, 1993 | Montreal | Canada | Métropolis | The Nils |
| July 27, 1993 | Toronto | Canada | RPM Club | —N/a |
| July 28, 1993 | Kitchener | Canada | Lulu's Club | Teenage Head |
| July 31, 1993 | High River | Canada | High River Rodeo Centre (IN-FEST) | —N/a |
Europe
| August 12, 1993 | Oslo | Norway | Rockefeller Music Hall | —N/a |
| August 13, 1993 | Hultsfred | Sweden | Folkets Park (Hultsfred Festival) | —N/a |
| August 14, 1993 | Dessel | Belgium | Crossterrein Witte Berg (Graspop Metal Meeting) | —N/a |
| August 15, 1993 | Northeim | Germany | Waldbühne | Slime; The Bates |
North America
| August 27, 1993 | Detroit | United States | Michigan State Fairgrounds Coliseum | —N/a |
North America
| September 22, 1993 | Danbury | United States | Tuxedo Junction | —N/a |
| September 23, 1993 | Sea Bright | United States | Tradewinds | —N/a |
| September 24, 1993 | New Haven | United States | Toad's Place | My Little Funhouse |
| September 25, 1993 | Poughkeepsie | United States | Unknown venue | —N/a |
North America
| November 1, 1993 | New Britain | United States | The Sting | My Little Funhouse |
| November 5, 1993 | Richmond | United States | The Flood Zone | —N/a |
| November 6, 1993 | Wilmington | United States | Mad Monk | —N/a |
| November 8, 1993 | Charlottesville | United States | Trax | —N/a |
| November 9, 1993 | Morgantown | United States | West Virginia University | —N/a |
| November 11, 1993 | Winston-Salem | United States | Ziggy's | Motorola |
| November 12, 1993 | Myrtle Beach | United States | Purple Gator | —N/a |
| November 13, 1993 | Norfolk | United States | The Boathouse | Motorola |
| November 14, 1993 | Charlotte | United States | Pterodactyl Club | Queen Sarah Saturday |
| November 16, 1993 | Greenville | United States | Characters | Queen Sarah Saturday |
| November 17, 1993 | North Charleston | United States | Carolina Concert Stage At Desperado | —N/a |
| November 19, 1993 | Baltimore | United States | Hammerjack's | —N/a |
| November 20, 1993 | Trenton | United States | City Gardens | The Bouncing Souls |
Superbang Festival Tour
| December 4, 1993 | Kassel | Germany | Eissporthalle Kassel | —N/a |
| December 6, 1993 | Böblingen | Germany | Sporthalle | —N/a |
| December 7, 1993 | Berlin | Germany | Deutschlandhalle | —N/a |
| December 8, 1993 | Frankfurt | Germany | Festhalle Frankfurt | —N/a |
| December 10, 1993 | Munich | Germany | Terminal 1 Flughafen München | —N/a |
| December 12, 1993 | Hanover | Germany | Eilenriedehalle | —N/a |
| December 13, 1993 | Bremen | Germany | Stadthalle Bremen | —N/a |
| December 14, 1993 | Hamburg | Germany | Alsterdorfer Sporthalle | —N/a |
| December 16, 1993 | Essen | Germany | Grugahalle | —N/a |
| December 17, 1993 | Halle | Germany | Eissporthalle | —N/a |
| December 18, 1993 | Trier | Germany | Europahalle | —N/a |

=== First setlist ===
1. "Durango 95"
2. "Teenage Lobotomy"
3. "Psycho Therapy"
4. "Blitzkrieg Bop"
5. "Do You Remember Rock 'n' Roll Radio?"
6. "I Believe in Miracles"
7. "Gimme Gimme Shock Treatment"
8. "Rock 'n' Roll High School"
9. "I Wanna Be Sedated"
10. "Censorshit"
11. "I Wanna Live"
12. "Bonzo Goes to Bitburg"
13. "Tomorrow She Goes Away"
14. "Sheena Is a Punk Rocker"
15. "Rockaway Beach"
16. "Pet Sematary"
17. "I Wanna Be Well"
18. "Glad to See You Go"
19. "Take It as It Comes" (The Doors cover)
20. "Somebody Put Something in My Drink"
21. "Commando"
22. "Wart Hog"
23. "Cretin Hop"
24. "Judy Is a Punk"
25. "Today Your Love, Tomorrow the World"
26. "Pinhead"

Encore:

27. "Poison Heart"
28. "Chinese Rock" or "7 and 7 Is" (Love cover)
29. "We're a Happy Family"

Encore 2:

30. "Strength to Endure"
31. "Beat on the Brat"
32. "California Sun" (Joe Jones cover) Replaced by "Havana Affair" on Leg 5)

=== Second setlist ===
1. "Durango 95"
2. "Teenage Lobotomy"
3. "Psycho Therapy"
4. "Blitzkrieg Bop"
5. "Do You Remember Rock 'n' Roll Radio?"
6. "I Believe in Miracles"
7. "Gimme Gimme Shock Treatment"
8. "Rock 'n' Roll High School"
9. "I Wanna Be Sedated"
10. "Censorshit"
11. "I Wanna Live"
12. "Bonzo Goes to Bitburg"
13. "Tomorrow She Goes Away"
14. "Sheena Is a Punk Rocker"
15. "Rockaway Beach"
16. "Pet Sematary"
17. "I Wanna Be Well"
18. "Glad to See You Go"
19. "Take It as It Comes" (The Doors cover)
20. "Somebody Put Something in My Drink"
21. "7 and 7 Is" (Love cover)
22. "Wart Hog"
23. "Cretin Hop"
24. "Judy Is a Punk"
25. "Today Your Love, Tomorrow the World"
26. "Pinhead"

Encore:

27. "My Back Pages" (Bob Dylan cover)
28. "Poison Heart"
29. "We're a Happy Family"

Encore 2:

30. "Strength to Endure"
31. "Chinese Rock"
32. "Beat on the Brat"

== 1994 ==
| Date | City | Country | Venue | Opening act(s) |
Oceania
| January 21, 1994 | Gold Coast | Australia | Gold Coast Parklands (Big Day Out) | —N/a |
| January 23, 1994 | Melbourne | Australia | Royal Melbourne Showgrounds (Big Day Out) | —N/a |
| January 25, 1994 | Hobart | Australia | Hobart City Hall | —N/a |
| January 26, 1994 | Sydney | Australia | Sydney Showground (Big Day Out) | —N/a |
| January 28, 1994 | Wayville | Australia | Royal Adelaide Showgrounds (Big Day Out) | —N/a |
| January 30, 1994 | Fremantle | Australia | Fremantle Oval (Big Day Out) | —N/a |
Asia
| February 2, 1994 | Kawasaki | Japan | Club Citta | —N/a |
| February 3, 1994 | Kawasaki | Japan | Club Citta | —N/a |
| February 5, 1994 | Fukuoka | Japan | Tsukushi Kaikan | Escalaton |
| February 6, 1994 | Osaka | Japan | Matsushita IMP Hall | —N/a |
| February 7, 1994 | Nagoya | Japan | Diamond Hall | —N/a |
| February 9, 1994 | Kawasaki | Japan | Club Citta | —N/a |
| February 10, 1994 | Kawasaki | Japan | Club Citta | Urge Overkill |
| February 11, 1994 | Kawasaki | Japan | Club Citta | Urge Overkill |
North America
| March 8, 1994 | San Francisco | United States | Warfield Theatre | Frank Black |
| March 9, 1994 | Fresno | United States | Wilson Theater | Frank Black |
| March 10, 1994 | Los Angeles | United States | Hollywood Palladium | Frank Black |
| March 11, 1994 | San Diego | United States | Price Center | Frank Black |
| March 12, 1994 | Irvine | United States | Crawford Hall | Frank Black |
| March 14, 1994 | Honolulu | United States | After Dark | All |
| March 16, 1994 | Phoenix | United States | The Grind | Frank Black |
| March 18, 1994 | Boulder | United States | Glenn Miller Ballroom | —N/a |
| March 20, 1994 | Dallas | United States | The Bomb Factory | Frank Black; The Cadillac Tramps |
| March 21, 1994 | Houston | United States | Bayou City Theatre | Frank Black; The Reverend Horton Heat |
| March 23, 1994 | St. Louis | United States | Mississippi Nights | Frank Black |
| March 25, 1994 | Chicago | United States | Riviera Theatre | Frank Black; Cowboy Junkies |
| March 26, 1994 | Detroit | United States | State Theatre | Frank Black |
| March 27, 1994 | Columbus | United States | Newport Music Hall | Frank Black |
| March 28, 1994 | Cleveland | United States | Agora | Frank Black |
| March 30, 1994 | Providence | United States | The Strand | Frank Black |
| March 31, 1994 | New York City | United States | The Academy | Frank Black |
| April 1, 1994 | New York City | United States | Roseland Ballroom | Frank Black |
| April 2, 1994 | Upper Darby Township | United States | Tower Theater | Frank Black |
| April 3, 1994 | Asbury Park | United States | The Stone Pony | Frank Black |
| April 5, 1994 | New Haven | United States | Toad's Place | Frank Black |
| April 6, 1994 | College Park | United States | Ritchie Coliseum | Frank Black |
| April 8, 1994 | Atlanta | United States | The Roxy | Frank Black |
| April 9, 1994 | Birmingham | United States | Five Points South Music Hall | Frank Black |
| April 11, 1994 | Fort Lauderdale | United States | The Edge | Frank Black |
| April 12, 1994 | Orlando | United States | The Edge | Frank Black |
South America
| May 10, 1994 | São Paulo | Brazil | Olympia | Innocentes |
| May 11, 1994 | São Paulo | Brazil | Olympia | Innocentes |
| May 12, 1994 | São Paulo | Brazil | Olympia | Innocentes |
| May 14, 1994 | Buenos Aires | Argentina | José Amalfitani Stadium | Performers Co-headlining with: Motörhead; Supported by: Attaque 77; 2 Minutos; Mal Momento |
| May 16, 1994 | Santiago | Chile | Teatro Monumental | Los Morton |
| May 18, 1994 | Buenos Aires | Argentina | Estadio Obras Sanitarias | 2 Minutos |
| May 19, 1994 | Buenos Aires | Argentina | Estadio Obras Sanitarias | 2 Minutos |
Europe
| June 11, 1994 | Nieuw-Schoonebeek | Netherlands | Heynen | —N/a |
| June 12, 1994 | Brussels | Belgium | Luna Theater | —N/a |
| June 13, 1994 | Ris-Orangis | France | Le Plan | —N/a |
| June 14, 1994 | Paris | France | Élysée Montmartre | —N/a |
Europe
| June 23, 1994 | Helsinki | Finland | Tavastia Club | —N/a |
| June 24, 1994 | Kauhajoki | Finland | Nummijärvi (Nummirock) | —N/a |
| June 25, 1994 | Ringe | Denmark | Dyrskuepladsen (Midtfyns Festival) | —N/a |
North America
| August 5, 1994 | Toronto | Canada | Palladium | Live |
| August 6, 1994 | Bridgenorth | Canada | Pines Pavilion | Live |
| August 7, 1994 | St. Catharines | Canada | Canadian Auto Workers Union Hall | Live |
| August 9, 1994 | Ottawa | Canada | Ottawa Congress Centre | Live |
| August 10, 1994 | Montreal | Canada | Métropolis | Live |
| August 12, 1994 | Kitchener | Canada | Lulu's Club | Teenage Head |
| August 13, 1994 | Bala | Canada | The KEE to Bala | —N/a |
| August 15, 1994 | Buffalo | United States | Blind Mellons | —N/a |
| August 16, 1994* | Rochester | United States | Horizontal Boogie Bar | The Cells |
| August 17, 1994 | Allentown | United States | Starz | End Zone |
| August 19, 1994 | Hampton Beach | United States | Hampton Beach Casino Ballroom | The Queers |
| August 20, 1994 | New Britain | United States | The Sting | Fat Tuesday |
Europe
| September 21, 1994 | Oviedo | Spain | Plaza de toros Buenavista | —N/a |
| September 23, 1994 | Glasgow | Scotland | Barrowland Ballroom | Goodbye Mr Mackenzie |
| September 24, 1994 | Newcastle | England | Newcastle University | Wierdswar |
| September 25, 1994 | London | England | Brixton Academy | S*M*A*S*H; Speedway |
| September 26, 1994 | Nottingham | England | Rock City | These Animal Men |
| September 28, 1994 | Geneva | Switzerland | Palladium | —N/a |
| September 29, 1994 | Milan | Italy | City Square | —N/a |
| September 30, 1994 | Sassari | Italy | Palasport Roberta Serradimigni | —N/a |
| October 1, 1994 | Rimini | Italy | Velvet Club | —N/a |
| October 4, 1994 | Rome | Italy | Teatro Tendastrisce | Senzabenza |
| October 6, 1994 | Athens | Greece | Rodon Club | Nightstalker |
| October 7, 1994 | Athens | Greece | Rodon Club | Nightstalker |
| October 8, 1994 | Athens | Greece | Rodon Club | Nightstalker |
| October 10, 1994 | Ljubljana | Slovenia | Tivoli Hall | —N/a |
| October 11, 1994 | Zagreb | Croatia | Dom Sportova | Hladno pivo |
| October 12, 1994 | Linz | Austria | Posthof | Dharma Bums Insane |
| October 13, 1994 | Prague | Czech Republic | Lucerna Music Bar | Plexis |
| October 15, 1994 | Arendonk | Belgium | Bemdhal | —N/a |
| October 16, 1994 | Rotterdam | Netherlands | Nighttown | —N/a |
South America
| November 5, 1994 | Rio de Janeiro | Brazil | Circo Voador | Innocentes |
| November 6, 1994 | Belo Horizonte | Brazil | Parque de Exposições Bolivar de Andrade | Viper; Overdose; Sepultura |
| November 9, 1994 | Porto Alegre | Brazil | Gigantinho | Raimundos; Sepultura |
| November 11, 1994 | Balneário Camboriú | Brazil | Pavilhão da Santur | Raimundos; Sepultura |
| November 12, 1994 | Curitiba | Brazil | Pedreira Paulo Leminski | Viper; Raimundos; Sepultura |
| November 14, 1994 | Montevideo | Uruguay | Palacio Peñarol | Luz Roja; Trotsky Vengarán |
| November 16, 1994 | Rosario | Argentina | Estadio Cubierto Newell's Old Boys | —N/a |
| November 18, 1994 | Mar del Plata | Argentina | Go! Disco | —N/a |
| November 19, 1994 | Bahía Blanca | Argentina | Club Estudiantes | —N/a |

* - D Generation were supposed to open for this show but cancelled.

=== Typical setlist ===
1. "Durango 95"
2. "Teenage Lobotomy"
3. "Psycho Therapy"
4. "Blitzkrieg Bop"
5. "Do You Remember Rock 'n' Roll Radio?"
6. "I Believe in Miracles"
7. "Gimme Gimme Shock Treatment"
8. "Rock 'n' Roll High School"
9. "I Wanna Be Sedated"
10. "Substitute" (The Who cover) (Replaced by "Have You Ever Seen the Rain?" after Leg 2)
11. "I Wanna Live"
12. "Bonzo Goes to Bitburg"
13. "Commando"
14. "Sheena Is a Punk Rocker"
15. "Rockaway Beach"
16. "Pet Sematary"
17. "Strength to Endure" or "Main Man"
18. "Journey to the Center of the Mind" (The Amboy Dukes cover)
19. "Take It as It Comes" (The Doors cover)
20. "Somebody Put Something in My Drink"
21. "7 and 7 Is" (Love cover)
22. "Wart Hog"
23. "Cretin Hop"
24. "Listen to My Heart"
25. "Today Your Love, Tomorrow the World"
26. "Pinhead"

Encore:

27. "My Back Pages" (Bob Dylan cover)
28. "Poison Heart"
29. "We're a Happy Family"

Encore 2:

30. "The Shape of Things to Come" (Max Frost and the Troopers cover) or "R.A.M.O.N.E.S." (Motörhead cover)
31. "Chinese Rock"
32. "Beat on the Brat"

== 1995 ==
| Date | City | Country | Venue | Supporting act(s) |
North America (Note: All dates except March 8–11 were rescheduled due a throat infection that Joey had.)
| ~~March 3, 1995~~ | St. Petersburg | United States | Jannus Landing | The Psychies The Solvents |
| ~~March 4, 1995~~ | Fort Lauderdale | United States | The Edge | Unknown support |
| ~~March 5, 1995~~ | Jacksonville | United States | The Edge | La Vista Hotheads |
| ~~March 6, 1995~~ | Orlando | United States | The Edge | La Vista Hotheads |
| ~~March 8, 1995~~ | Greenville | United States | Characters | The Independents |
| ~~March 9, 1995~~ | Myrtle Beach | United States | The Social Room | The Independents |
| ~~March 10, 1995~~ | Winston-Salem | United States | Ziggy's | Unknown support |
| ~~March 11, 1995~~ | Charlotte | United States | Capri | Unknown support |
| ~~March 13, 1995~~ | Raleigh | United States | The Ritz | Unknown support |
| ~~March 14, 1995~~ | Richmond | United States | The Flood Zone | Unknown support |
| ~~March 15, 1995~~ | Newark | United States | Stone Balloon | Unknown support |
| ~~March 17, 1995~~ | Norfolk | United States | The Boathouse | —N/a |
| ~~March 18, 1995~~ | Baltimore | United States | Hammerjack's | Jakkpot |
North America
| April 7, 1995 | New Haven | United States | Toad's Place | The Friggs |
| April 8, 1995 | Port Chester | United States | Capitol Theatre | D Generation; Our Lady Peace |
| April 9, 1995 | Garden City | United States | Nassau Community College | —N/a |
| April 10, 1995 | Poughkeepsie | United States | The Chance | —N/a |
| April 12, 1995 | Lancaster | United States | The Village | —N/a |
| April 13, 1995 | Allentown | United States | Starz | The Smarties Solution A.D. |
| April 14, 1995 | Martinsburg | United States | Slammers | —N/a |
| April 15, 1995 | Milton | United States | Fiddlestyx | —N/a |
| April 18, 1995 | Jacksonville | United States | The Edge | Pendulum Swing |
| April 19, 1995 | St. Petersburg | United States | Jannus Landing | The Psychies The Solvents |
| April 20, 1995 | Fort Lauderdale | United States | The Edge | Load |
| April 21, 1995 | Orlando | United States | The Edge | Laughing Boy |
| April 23, 1995 | Panama City Beach | United States | Spinnaker Beach Club | —N/a |
| April 30, 1995 | Farmville | United States | Lancer Hall | —N/a |
| May 1, 1995 | Raleigh | United States | The Ritz | Antiseen; Queen Sarah Saturday |
| May 3, 1995 | Newark | United States | Stone Balloon | —N/a |
| May 4, 1995 | Richmond | United States | The Flood Zone | Otis; Rocket 69 |
| May 5, 1995 | Baltimore | United States | Hammerjack's | Jakkpot |
| May 6, 1995 | Norfolk | United States | The Boathouse | Otis |
North America
| May 20, 1995 | Cuyahoga Falls | United States | Blossom Music Center (Buzzard Fest) | —N/a |
| May 24, 1995 | Clarkston | United States | Pine Knob Music Theatre (Planetfest) | —N/a |
| May 25, 1995 | Indianapolis | United States | The Vogue | Dirt Merchants |
| May 27, 1995 | Madison | United States | Barrymore Theatre | Face to Face |
| May 28, 1995 | Somerset | United States | Float Rite Park Amphitheatre (Edgefest) | —N/a |
| May 29, 1995 | Milwaukee | United States | Marcus Amphitheater (New Rock Fest) | —N/a |
| June 3, 1995 | Washington, D.C. | United States | Robert F. Kennedy Memorial Stadium (HFStival) | —N/a |
North America
| June 17, 1995 | Irvine | United States | Irvine Meadows Amphitheatre (KROQ Weenie Roast) | —N/a |
Europe
| June 24, 1995 | Skellefteå | Sweden | Festivalområdet (Skellefteåfestivalem) | —N/a |
| June 25, 1995 | Kalvøya | Norway | Festivalplassen (Kalvøyafestivalen) | —N/a |
| June 27, 1995 | London | England | London Astoria | Anti-Nowhere League; Stop |
| June 28, 1995 | London | England | London Astoria | Anti-Nowhere League; Stop |
| June 29, 1995 | Leicester | England | University of Leicester | —N/a |
| July 1, 1995 | Caen | France | Zénith de Caen (La Cale Festival) | —N/a |
| July 2, 1995 | Ris-Orangis | France | Le Plan | —N/a |
| July 3, 1995 | Reims | France | L'Usine | Backsliders |
| July 5, 1995 | Marthon | France | American Legend Festival | —N/a |
| July 7, 1995 | Bonn | Germany | Biskuithalle | —N/a |
| July 8, 1995 | Lummen | Belgium | Sportveld Sint-Ferdinand (Zwemdokrock) | —N/a |
| July 9, 1995 | Dour | Belgium | La Plaine de La Machine à Feu (Dour Festival) | —N/a |
| July 10, 1995 | Amsterdam | Netherlands | Paradiso | —N/a |
North America
| August 2, 1995 | Providence | United States | Strand Theater | Solution A.D. |
| August 4, 1995 | Boston | United States | Avalon | Solution A.D. |
| August 5, 1995 | New York City | United States | The Academy | Otis |
| August 6, 1995 | Lido Beach | United States | Malibu Night Club | Unknown support |
| August 8, 1995 | Allentown | United States | Starz | Solution A.D. |
| August 9, 1995 | Washington, D.C. | United States | The Capitol Ballroom | Gren |
| August 11, 1995 | Agawam | United States | Riverside Park Stadium | Gren |
| August 12, 1995 | Asbury Park | United States | The Stone Pony | Gren |
| August 14, 1995 | Pittsburgh | United States | I.C. Light Amphitheatre | Gren; The Frampton Brothers |
| August 15, 1995 | Cleveland | United States | Nautica Stage | Gren |
| August 17, 1995 | Pontiac | United States | Phoenix Plaza Amphitheater | Dandelion |
| August 18, 1995 | Chicago | United States | Riviera Theatre | Gren |
| August 19, 1995 | Maryland Heights | United States | Riverport Amphitheatre (Pointfest) | —N/a |
| August 21, 1995 | Denver | United States | Ogden Theatre | —N/a |
| August 23, 1995 | Magna | United States | The Great Saltair | Headshake |
| August 25, 1995 | Paradise | United States | The Joint | —N/a |
| August 26, 1995 | Phoenix | United States | Party Gardens | Lucy's Fur Coat |
| August 28, 1995 | San Diego | United States | Soma San Diego | Wax |
| August 29, 1995 | Los Angeles | United States | Hollywood Palladium | Gren NY Loose |
| August 30, 1995 | Bakersfield | United States | Tejon Theatre | Gren |
| August 31, 1995 | San Francisco | United States | Warfield Theatre | Wax |
| September 2, 1995 | Portland | United States | Roseland Theater | Unknown support |
| September 3, 1995 | Seattle | United States | Memorial Stadium (Bumbershoot) | —N/a |
| September 10, 1995 | Atlanta | United States | Coca-Cola Lakewood Amphitheatre (99X Big Day Out) | —N/a |
| September 13, 1995 | Phoenix | United States | Arizona Veterans Memorial Coliseum | Support act for: Pearl Jam |
| September 14, 1995 | Las Cruces | United States | Pan American Center | Support act for: Pearl Jam |
| September 16, 1995 | Austin | United States | South Park Meadows | Support act for: Pearl Jam |
| September 17, 1995 | New Orleans | United States | Tad Gormley Stadium | Support act for: Pearl Jam |
South America
| October 2, 1995 | Buenos Aires | Argentina | Estadio Obras Sanitarias | Cadena Perpetua; Mal Momento |
| October 3, 1995 | Buenos Aires | Argentina | Estadio Obras Sanitarias | —N/a |
| October 4, 1995 | Buenos Aires | Argentina | Estadio Obras Sanitarias | Doble Fuerza; Flema |
| October 5, 1995 | Buenos Aires | Argentina | Estadio Obras Sanitarias | Bien Desocupados |
| October 6, 1995 | Buenos Aires | Argentina | Estadio Obras Sanitarias | 2 Minutos; Superuva |
| October 7, 1995 | Buenos Aires | Argentina | Estadio Obras Sanitarias | 2 Minutos; Superuva |
Asia
| October 16, 1995 | Tokyo | Japan | Nakano Sun Plaza | —N/a |
| October 17, 1995 | Tokyo | Japan | Nakano Sun Plaza | —N/a |
| October 18, 1995 | Kawasaki | Japan | Club Citta | —N/a |
| October 20, 1995 | Fukuoka | Japan | Crossing Hall | —N/a |
| October 22, 1995 | Matsumoto | Japan | Shakai Bunka Kaikan | —N/a |
| October 23, 1995 | Kawasaki | Japan | Club Citta | —N/a |
| October 25, 1995 | Sapporo | Japan | Zanaedu | —N/a |
| October 27, 1995 | Nagoya | Japan | Diamond Hall | —N/a |
| October 28, 1995 | Kawasaki | Japan | Club Citta | —N/a |
| October 29, 1995 | Kawasaki | Japan | Club Citta | —N/a |
| October 30, 1995 | Nagoya | Japan | Diamond Hall | —N/a |
| November 1, 1995 | Osaka | Japan | Matsushita IMP Hall | —N/a |
| November 2, 1995 | Osaka | Japan | Matsushita IMP Hall | —N/a |
North America
| November 6, 1995 | San Diego | United States | San Diego Sports Arena | Support act for: Pearl Jam |
| November 7, 1995 | San Diego | United States | San Diego Sports Arena | Support act for: Pearl Jam |
| November 18, 1995 | Auburn Hills | United States | The Palace of Auburn Hills | Support act for: White Zombie |
| November 20, 1995 | Louisville | United States | Louisville Gardens | Support act for: White Zombie |
| November 21, 1995 | Dayton | United States | Hara Arena | Support act for: White Zombie |
| November 22, 1995 | Cleveland | United States | CSU Convocation Center | Support act for: White Zombie |
| November 24, 1995 | Muskegon | United States | L.C. Walker Arena | Support act for: White Zombie |
| November 25, 1995 | Saginaw | United States | Wendler Arena | Support act for: White Zombie |
| November 27, 1995 | Hamilton | Canada | Copps Coliseum | Support act for: White Zombie |
| November 28, 1995 | Verdun | Canada | Verdun Auditorium | Support act for: White Zombie |
| November 29, 1995 | Lewiston | United States | Central Maine Civic Center | Support act for: White Zombie |
| November 30, 1995 | Albany | United States | Knickerbocker Arena | Support act for: White Zombie |
| December 2, 1995 | Hartford | United States | Meadows Music Theatre | Support act for: White Zombie |
| December 4, 1995 | Rochester | United States | Blue Cross Arena | Support act for: White Zombie |
| December 5, 1995 | Hamburg | United States | International Agri-Center | Support act for: White Zombie |
| December 6, 1995 | Binghamton | United States | Broome County Arena | Support act for: White Zombie |
| December 10, 1995 | Salisbury | United States | Wicomico Civic Center | Support act for: White Zombie |
| December 12, 1995 | Salem | United States | Salem Civic Center | Support act for: White Zombie |
| December 13, 1995 | Philadelphia | United States | Philadelphia Civic Center | Support act for: White Zombie |
| December 14, 1995 | Fairfax | United States | Patriot Center | Support act for: White Zombie |

=== First setlist (Leg 1-2) ===
1. "Durango 95"
2. "Teenage Lobotomy"
3. "Psycho Therapy"
4. "Blitzkrieg Bop"
5. "Do You Remember Rock 'n' Roll Radio?"
6. "I Believe in Miracles"
7. "Gimme Gimme Shock Treatment"
8. "Rock 'n' Roll High School"
9. "I Wanna Be Sedated"
10. "Have You Ever Seen the Rain?" (Creedence Clearwater Revival cover)
11. "I Wanna Live" (Replaced by "The KKK Took My Baby Away" after Leg 1)
12. "Bonzo Goes to Bitburg" (Replaced by "I Don't Wanna Grow Up"after Leg 1)
13. "Commando"
14. "Sheena Is a Punk Rocker"
15. "Rockaway Beach"
16. "Pet Sematary"
17. "Strength to Endure"
18. "Cretin Family"
19. "Take It as It Comes" (The Doors cover)
20. "Somebody Put Something in My Drink"
21. "7 and 7 Is" (Love cover)
22. "Wart Hog"
23. "Cretin Hop"
24. "Listen to My Heart"
25. "Today Your Love, Tomorrow the World"
26. "Pinhead"

Encore:

27. "My Back Pages" (Bob Dylan cover)
28. "Poison Heart"
29. "We're a Happy Family"

Encore 2:

30. "R.A.M.O.N.E.S." (Motörhead cover)
31. "Chinese Rock"
32. "Beat on the Brat"

=== Second setlist (Legs 4-7) ===
1. "Durango 95"
2. "Teenage Lobotomy"
3. "Psycho Therapy"
4. "Blitzkrieg Bop"
5. "Do You Remember Rock 'n' Roll Radio?"
6. "I Believe in Miracles"
7. "Gimme Gimme Shock Treatment"
8. "Rock 'n' Roll High School"
9. "I Wanna Be Sedated"
10. "Spider-Man"
11. "The KKK Took My Baby Away"
12. "I Don't Wanna Grow Up" (Tom Waits cover)
13. "Commando"
14. "Sheena Is a Punk Rocker"
15. "Rockaway Beach"
16. "Pet Sematary"
17. "Strength to Endure"
18. "Cretin Family"
19. "Take It as It Comes" (The Doors cover)
20. "Somebody Put Something in My Drink"
21. "7 and 7 Is" (Love cover)
22. "Wart Hog"
23. "Cretin Hop"
24. "R.A.M.O.N.E.S." (Motörhead cover)
25. "Today Your Love, Tomorrow the World"
26. "Pinhead"

Encore:

27. "The Crusher"
28. "Poison Heart"
29. "We're a Happy Family"

Encore 2:

30. "My Back Pages" (Bob Dylan cover)
31. "Chinese Rock"
32. "Beat on the Brat"

=== Supporting act setlist ===
1. "Durango 95"
2. "Teenage Lobotomy"
3. "Psycho Therapy"
4. "Blitzkrieg Bop"
5. "Do You Remember Rock 'n' Roll Radio?"
6. "I Believe in Miracles"
7. "Gimme Gimme Shock Treatment"
8. "Rock 'n' Roll High School"
9. "I Wanna Be Sedated"
10. "Spider-Man" or "I Don't Wanna Grow Up" (Tom Waits cover)
11. "Sheena Is a Punk Rocker"
12. "Rockaway Beach"
13. "Pet Sematary"
14. "The Crusher"
15. "Cretin Family" or "My Back Pages" (Bob Dylan cover)
16. "Chinese Rock"
17. "Somebody Put Something in My Drink"
18. "Wart Hog"
19. "Cretin Hop"
20. "R.A.M.O.N.E.S." (Motörhead cover)
21. "Today Your Love, Tomorrow the World"
22. "Pinhead"

== 1996 ==
| Date | City | Country | Venue | Opening act(s) |
Europe
| ~~January 17, 1996~~ | Florence | Italy | Teatro Tenda | —N/a |
| ~~January 18, 1996~~ | Rome | Italy | Palladium Theater | —N/a |
| January 19, 1996 | Budrio | Italy | Palazzetto dello Sport Luciano Marani | The Sultans of Ping FC; Senzabenza |
| January 20, 1996 | Pordenone | Italy | Palasport | The Sultans of Ping FC; Senzabenza |
| January 22, 1996 | Milan | Italy | Palatrussardi | Senza Benza |
| January 23, 1996 | Munich | Germany | Terminal 1 Flughafen München Munich | Rammstein |
| January 24, 1996 | Offenbach | Germany | Stadthalle Offenbach | Rammstein |
| January 26, 1996 | Bonn | Germany | Biskuithalle | Rammstein |
| January 28, 1996 | Berlin | Germany | Huxley's Neue Welt | Rammstein |
| January 29, 1996 | Hamburg | Germany | Docks | Rammstein |
| January 30, 1996 | Hanover | Germany | Capitol | Rammstein |
| January 31, 1996 | Amsterdam | Netherlands | Paradiso | The Sultans of Ping FC |
| February 2, 1996 | Bissegem | Belgium | De Kreun | The Sultans of Ping FC |
| February 3, 1996 | London | England | Brixton Academy | The Sultans of Ping FC; Scarfo |
North America
| February 12, 1996 | Providence | United States | Strand Theater | Gren |
| February 13, 1996 | Northampton | United States | Pearl Street | Gren |
| February 14, 1996 | Boston | United States | Avalon | Gren |
| February 16, 1996 | Philadelphia | United States | Electric Factory | Gren |
| February 17, 1996 | Washington, D.C. | United States | The Capitol Ballroom | Gren; The Pietasters |
| February 18, 1996 | Port Chester | United States | Capitol Theatre | Gren |
| February 20, 1996 | Harrisburg | United States | The Metron | —N/a |
| February 21, 1996 | Lido Beach | United States | Malibu Night Club | The Independents |
| February 23, 1996 | New Haven | United States | Toad's Place | The Independents |
| February 24, 1996 | Baltimore | United States | Hammerjack's | —N/a |
| February 25, 1996 | Red Bank | United States | The Count Basie | The Independents |
| February 27, 1996 | New York City | United States | Coney Island High | —N/a |
| February 28, 1996 | New York City | United States | Coney Island High | —N/a |
| February 29, 1996 | New York City | United States | The Academy (Recording for Greatest Hits Live) | Gren |
South America
| March 7, 1996 | Rio de Janeiro | Brazil | KM de Vantagens Hall | Raimundos; Planet Hemp |
| March 8, 1996 | Mogi das Cruzes | Brazil | La Boom | Raimundos; Sepultura |
| ~~March 9, 1996~~ | Porto Alegre | Brazil | Gigantinho | —N/a |
| March 10, 1996 | Santo André | Brazil | Clube Atlético Aramaçan | —N/a |
| March 11, 1996 | São Paulo | Brazil | Olympia | Psycho 69 |
| March 12, 1996 | São Paulo | Brazil | Olympia | Psycho 69 |
| March 13, 1996 | São Paulo | Brazil | Olympia | Psycho 69 |
| March 16, 1996 | Buenos Aires | Argentina | River Plate Stadium | Opening acts: Iggy Pop; 2 Minutos; Attaque 77; Die Toten Hosen |
North America
| April 18, 1996 | Indianapolis | United States | The Vogue | D Generation |
| April 19, 1996 | Chicago | United States | Riviera Theatre | D Generation |
| April 20, 1996 | Kalamazoo | United States | State Theatre | —N/a |
| April 21, 1996 | Detroit | United States | State Theatre | D Generation |
| April 23, 1996 | Cleveland | United States | The Odeon | D Generation |
| April 25, 1996 | Allentown | United States | Starz | D Generation |
| April 26, 1996 | Pittsburgh | United States | I.C. Light Amphitheatre | D Generation |
| April 27, 1996 | Rochester | United States | The Palestra | D Generation |
| April 28, 1996 | Albany | United States | Lincoln Park (SUNY Parkfest) | —N/a |
| April 30, 1996 | New York City | United States | Coney Island High | —N/a |
| May 1, 1996 | New York City | United States | Coney Island High | —N/a |
North America
| May 22, 1996 | Little Rock | United States | Midnight Rodeo | —N/a |
| May 23, 1996 | Memphis | United States | Club 616 | D Generation |
| May 25, 1996 | Atlanta | United States | Masquerade Music Park | Drivin N Cryin |
| May 26, 1996 | Birmingham | United States | Five Points South Music Hall | Unknown support |
Lollapalooza
| June 27, 1996 | Kansas City | United States | Longview Lake | —N/a |
| June 28, 1996 | Des Moines | United States | Iowa State Fairgrounds | —N/a |
| June 30, 1996 | Pecatonica | United States | Winnebago County Fairgrounds | —N/a |
| July 2, 1996 | Noblesville | United States | Deer Creek Music Center | —N/a |
| July 3, 1996 | Thornville | United States | Buckeye Lake Music Center | —N/a |
| July 5, 1996 | Barrie | Canada | Molson Park | —N/a |
| July 7, 1996 | Quebec City | Canada | Quebec Hippodrome | —N/a |
| July 9, 1996 | Pownal | United States | Green Mountain Race Track | —N/a |
| July 10, 1996 | New York City | United States | Downing Stadium | —N/a |
| July 11, 1996 | New York City | United States | Downing Stadium | —N/a |
| July 13, 1996 | Syracuse | United States | New York State Fairgrounds | —N/a |
| July 16, 1996 | Ranson | United States | Charles Town Raceway | —N/a |
| July 18, 1996 | West Palm Beach | United States | Coral Sky Amphitheater | —N/a |
| July 20, 1996 | Rockingham | United States | Rockingham Speedway | —N/a |
| July 21, 1996 | Newport | United States | Forks of the River Entertainment Showpark | —N/a |
| July 23, 1996 | New Orleans | United States | UNO Lakefront Arena | —N/a |
| July 25, 1996 | Ferris | United States | Old Fort Dallas | —N/a |
| July 27, 1996 | Chandler | United States | Compton Terrace | —N/a |
| July 30, 1996 | George | United States | The Gorge Amphitheatre | —N/a |
| ~~July 31, 1996~~ | George | United States | The Gorge Amphitheatre | —N/a |
| August 2, 1996 | San Jose | United States | Spartan Stadium | —N/a |
| August 3, 1996 | Irvine | United States | Irvine Meadows Amphitheatre | —N/a |
| August 4, 1996 | Irvine | United States | Irvine Meadows Amphitheatre | —N/a |
North America
| August 6, 1996 | Los Angeles | United States | The Palace; Recording for We're Outta Here! | —N/a |

=== Typical Main Setlist ===
1. "Durango 95"
2. "Teenage Lobotomy"
3. "Psycho Therapy"
4. "Blitzkrieg Bop"
5. "Do You Remember Rock 'n' Roll Radio?"
6. "I Believe in Miracles"
7. "Gimme Gimme Shock Treatment"
8. "Rock 'n' Roll High School"
9. "I Wanna Be Sedated"
10. "Spider-Man"
11. "The KKK Took My Baby Away"
12. "I Don't Wanna Grow Up" (Tom Waits cover)
13. "Commando" (Replaced by "Have You Ever Seen the Rain?" for Leg 3
14. "Sheena Is a Punk Rocker"
15. "Rockaway Beach"
16. "Pet Sematary"
17. "Strength to Endure"
18. "Cretin Family"
19. "Do You Want to Dance" (Bobby Freeman cover)
20. "Somebody Put Something in My Drink"
21. "7 and 7 Is" (Love cover) (Leg 1)
  "California Sun" (Joe Jones cover) (Leg 2)
  "Havana Affair" (Leg 3)
  "I Just Want to Have Something to Do" (Legs 4–5)
22. "Wart Hog"
23. "Cretin Hop"
24. "R.A.M.O.N.E.S." (Motörhead cover)
25. "Today Your Love, Tomorrow the World"
26. "Pinhead"

Encore:

27. "The Crusher"
28. "Poison Heart" or (Replaced by "I Don't Want You") after Leg 3)
29. "We're a Happy Family"(Replaced by "Surfin' Bird" cover) for Leg 3)

Encore 2:

30. "My Back Pages" (Bob Dylan cover)
31. "Chinese Rock"
32. "Beat on the Brat"

=== Lollapalooza setlist ===
1. "Durango 95"
2. "Teenage Lobotomy"
3. "Psycho Therapy"
4. "Blitzkrieg Bop"
5. "Do You Remember Rock 'n' Roll Radio?"
6. "I Believe in Miracles"
7. "Gimme Gimme Shock Treatment"
8. "Rock 'n' Roll High School"
9. "I Wanna Be Sedated"
10. "Spider-Man"
11. "Sheena Is a Punk Rocker"
12. "Rockaway Beach"
13. "Pet Sematary"
14. "Beat on the Brat" or "Do You Want to Dance" (Bobby Freeman cover)
15. "53rd & 3rd"
16. "Chinese Rock"
17. "Wart Hog"
18. "Cretin Hop"
19. "R.A.M.O.N.E.S." (Motörhead cover)
20. "Today Your Love, Tomorrow the World"
21. "Pinhead"
