= Mass media in Philadelphia =

This is a list of mass media in Philadelphia, Pennsylvania, United States.

== Newspapers and magazines ==
Newspaper	Founded	Type
The Philadelphia Inquirer	1829	Daily
Philadelphia Tribune	1884	Bi-weekly
Philadelphia magazine	1908	Monthly
Philadelphia Daily News	1925	Daily
South Philly Review	1947	Weekly
Northeast Times	1934	Weekly
Philadelphia Weekly	1971	Weekly
Philadelphia Gay News	1976	Weekly
AL DÍA	1994	Weekly
El Hispano	1976	Weekly
The Public Record	1999	Weekly
Philadelphia Metro	2000	Daily
Philadelphia Business Journal	1982	Weekly
The Hawk	1929	Weekly
The Temple News	1921	Weekly
The Daily Pennsylvanian	1885	Daily
The Triangle	1926	Weekly
The Jewish Exponent	1887	Weekly

Former newspapers:

- Philadelphia Bulletin
- The Catholic Standard & Times
- L'Abeille américaine
- Philadelphia City Paper

== Television stations ==
Network owned-and-operated stations are highlighted in bold.

Television station	Affiliate	Founded	Channel
WDPN-TV	MeTV	1988	2
**KYW-TV**	CBS	1941	3
**WPVI-TV**	ABC	1947	6
**WPSJ-CD**	Azteca America	1986	8
**WCAU**	NBC	1948	10
WHYY-TV	PBS	1957	12
**WPHL-TV**	The CW	1965	17
**WFPA-CD**	UniMás	1995	28
**WTXF-TV**	Fox	1965	29
WPPT	PBS	1990	35
**WELL-LD**	Daystar	1988	45
**WGTW-TV**	Trinity Broadcasting Network	1992	48
WPSG-TV	Independent	1981	57
**WPPX-TV**	Ion Television	1986	61
**WWSI-TV**	Telemundo	2001	62
**WUVP-DT**	Univision	1981	65
NBC Sports Philadelphia+	basic cable	1996
NBC Sports Philadelphia	basic cable	1997
Prism (former)	premium	1977

== AM radio stations ==
AM radio station	Frequency (kHz)	Format	Founded
WFIL	560	Religious	1922
WTEL	610	Sports	1922
WURD	900	Talk
WCHR	920	Religious
WKDN	950	Religious
WNTP	990	News/Talk
KYW	1060	News	1922
WPHT	1210	Talk	1922
WHAT	1340	Spanish language music	2007
WDAS	1480	Sports	2007
WNWR	1540	News/Talk
WEXP	1600	College	1972

== FM radio stations ==
FM radio stations	Frequency (MHz)	Format	Founded
WPEB	88.1	Variety	1981
WXPN	88.5	Adult Album Alternative, College, University of Pennsylvania	1945
WRDV	89.3	Oldies	1980
WRTI	90.1	Classical/Jazz	1948
WHYY	90.9	Public, NPR News/Talk	1954
WKDU	91.7	College, Drexel University	1958
WXTU	92.5	Country	1984
WMMR	93.3	”Alternative”	1942
WIP-FM	94.1	Sports Talk	1971
WPST	94.5	CHR	1965
WBEN	95.7	Adult Hits	2005
WTDY-FM	96.5	CHR	2003
WPEN	97.5	Sports Talk	2009
WOGL	98.1	Classic Hits	1987
WUSL	98.9	Urban	1975
WRNB	100.3	Urban AC	1940s
WBEB	101.1	Beautiful Music	1963
WIOQ	102.1	CHR	1989
WMGK	102.9	Classic Rock	1975
WPHI-FM	103.9	All news	1960
WRFF	104.5	Alternative	1965
WDAS	105.3	Urban AC	1959
WUMR (FM)	106.1	Spanish CHR	2022
WKVP	106.9	Contemporary Christian	2012
WPPZ	107.9	Urban Oldies	2005

== Online Media ==
Site	Founded
Philly.com	1995
Geekadelphia	2007
Billy Penn	2014
Technical.ly	2009
Philadelphia Jewish Voice	2005
Philadelphia Citizen	2015
CUS ChineseinUS.org	2020

== See also ==
- List of radio stations in the Philadelphia market
- List of newspapers in Pennsylvania
- Pen & Pencil Club
- Prometheus Radio Project
