= WUBA =

WUBA may refer to:

- WUBA (FM), a radio station (88.1 FM) licensed to High Springs, Florida, United States
- Wuba, a community in Kumbungu District in the Northern Region of Ghana
- WDAS (AM), a radio station (1480 AM) licensed to Philadelphia, Pennsylvania, United States, which held the call sign WUBA from 2007 to 2011
- WRFF, a radio station (104.5 FM) licensed to Philadelphia, Pennsylvania, United States, which held the call sign WUBA from 2006 to 2007
