= WDAS =

WDAS may refer to:

- WDAS (AM), a radio station (1480 AM) licensed to Philadelphia, Pennsylvania, United States
- WDAS-FM, a radio station (105.3 FM) licensed to Philadelphia, Pennsylvania, United States
- Walt Disney Animation Studios, the flagship animation studio of The Walt Disney Company
