= Friends' Central School =

Quaker school in Wynnewood, Pennsylvania, US

Location
- 1101 City Ave; Wynnewood, Pennsylvania 19096-3490; United States; 39.98502°N 75.26261°W

Information
- Type: Independent, day, college preparatory
- Religious affiliation: Christianity
- Denomination: Quakers
- Established: 1845; 181 years ago
- Status: Open
- Head of school: Beth D. Johnson
- Grades: N–12
- Gender: Coeducational
- Enrollment: 874 (2026-2027)
  - Pre-kindergarten: 76
  - Kindergarten: 28
  - Grade 1: 37
  - Grade 2: 34
  - Grade 3: 37
  - Grade 4: 31
  - Grade 5: 39
  - Grade 6: 48
  - Grade 7: 75
  - Grade 8: 64
  - Grade 9: 94
  - Grade 10: 107
  - Grade 11: 100
  - Grade 12: 104
- Student to teacher ratio: 5:1
- Campus type: Suburban
- Colors: Navy; White; Gray
- Athletics conference: Friends Schools League
- Nickname: Phoenix
- Annual tuition: $29,785-$52,800
- Nobel laureates: Karl Barry Sharpless
- Website: friendscentral.org
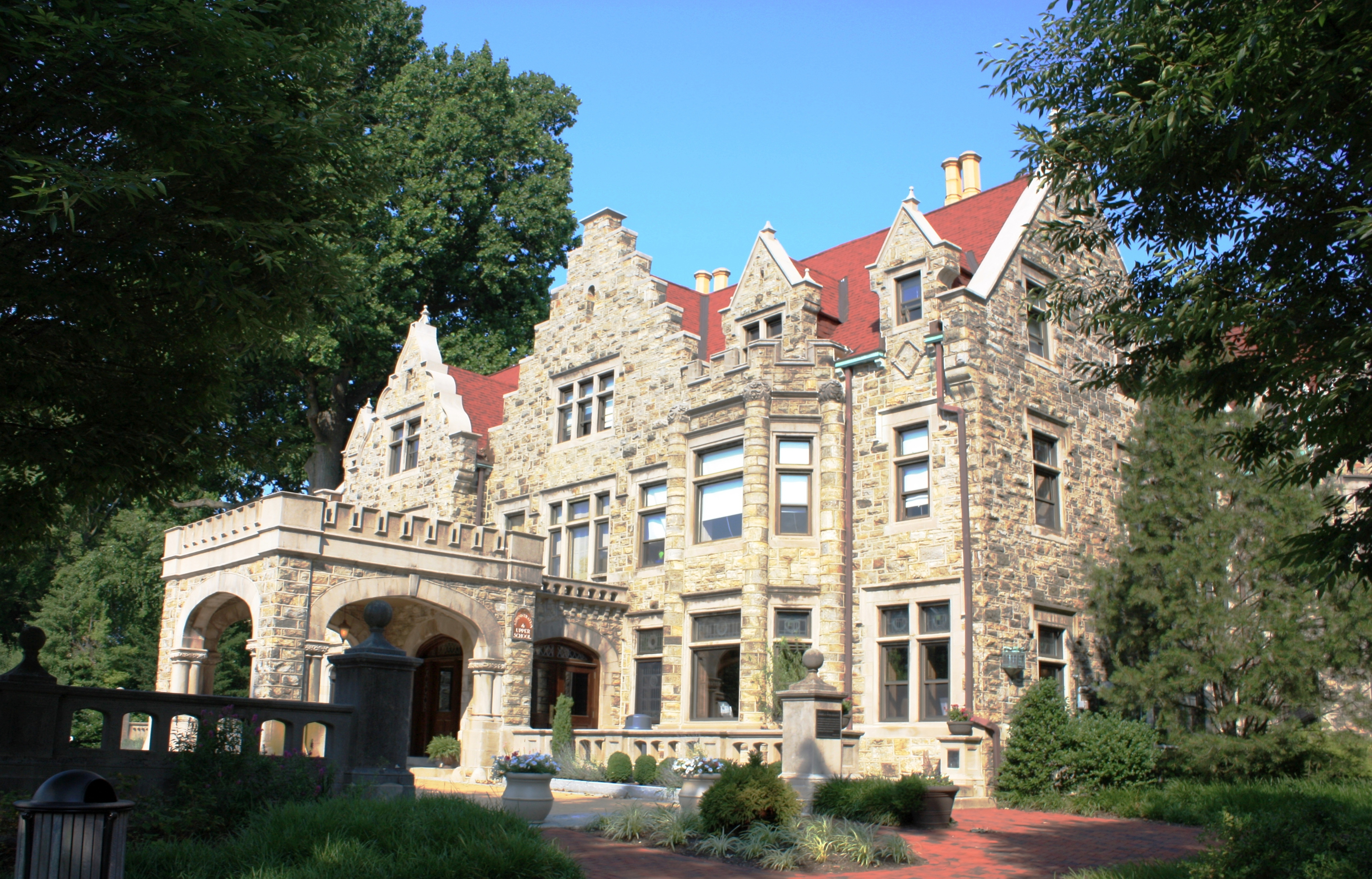

Friends' Central School (FCS) is a Quaker, independent, coeducational, college-preparatory day school for students in Nursery though grade 12. It is located on 41 acres across two campuses in Wynnewood, a community in Lower Merion Township, Pennsylvania in the Philadelphia metropolitan area.

The school was founded in 1845 in Philadelphia, near the current location of the Philadelphia Mint. It had an enrollment of 848 students from nursery to grade 12 in 2023.

Friends' Central is organized into three divisions: Lower School, Middle School, and Upper School. The Middle and Upper Schools are located on the City Avenue campus, while the Lower School occupies a separate campus in Wynnewood.

== History ==
=== 19th century ===
Friends' Central School was founded in 1845 in Philadelphia at 4th Street and Cherry Street, serving as an upper school for the Quaker primary schools with grades 7 through 12. In 1857, the school moved to 15th and Race Street, remaining at this location until 1925, when it moved to its current campus on City Avenue, formerly the Wistar Morris Estate. The main house of the estate, constructed in 1862, remains and serves as the administrative building of the school and an architectural focal point of the campus.

=== 20th century ===
In 1988, due to the growth of the student body, Friends' Central acquired the Montgomery School's property and relocated the lower school there.

=== 21st century ===
In 2000, the Shimada Athletic Center was constructed. In 2003, the Fannie Cox Center for Science, Math, and Technology was completed and opened.

In 2011, David Felsen retired after 23 years of service as headmaster; beginning in the 2012 school year, Craig Sellers was named Head of School.

On July 1, 2021, Beth D. Johnson, '77, was named interim Head of School. On February 17, 2022, Beth Johnson was unanimously named the 12th official head of Friends Central.

In 2022, Friends’ Central converted the former Rex Gymnasium into Phase I of the school's new Center for Innovation and Design (CID). Construction of Phase II of the CID began in January 2024, and the brand new, fully completed CID was finished in October 2024.

== Academics ==
Friends' Central School students achieved the highest average SAT scores in all three sections (Math, Verbal, and Writing) of the 19 schools that had scores reported in Suburban Life Magazine's 2010 report on suburban Philadelphia private high schools. The scores were 649 in Math, 669 in Verbal, and 666 in Writing.

Quaker values such as community, service, equality, and integrity are all incorporated into student life. All students attend a weekly Meeting for Worship on Wednesdays for 40 minutes, sharing messages when "moved to speak". The community convenes in one room in silence, and individuals stand when expressing thoughts to the community. Students are also required to perform off-campus service for mandatory hours. In the middle and upper school, students must take three courses concerning the history of the Society of Friends and the central philosophies of Quakerism from a non-religious perspective.

In middle school, 5th and 6th graders learn the history and faith of Quakerism, and the 9th-grade course further explores the Quaker faith and practice, focusing on a deeper understanding of the religion's history and its testimonies. 11th and 12th graders may take additional study in the origin and philosophy of religion in general.

== Athletics ==
Friends' Central has strong baseball, swimming, girls' track, boys' tennis, basketball, and wrestling programs. From 2009 to 2012, Friends' Central won four consecutive Pennsylvania Independent Schools Boys' Basketball Championships.

== Notable alumni ==
- Jonathan H. Adler, Case Western Reserve University School of Law professor
- Wynne Alexander, civil rights author and advocate, investigative journalist, and documentary filmmaker
- Edmund Bacon, urban planner, architect, educator, and author
- Bradley M. Campbell, attorney and politician
- Helen Taggart Clark, journalist and poet
- Ida Craddock, women's rights activist
- Brad Furman, film director
- Adam Goldstein, DJ known as DJ AM
- Andy Greenwald, author
- H.D., poet and novelist
- Hannah Clothier Hull (1872-1958), clubwoman, feminist, and pacifist
- De'Andre Hunter, professional basketball player
- Daniel Immerwahr, author
- William T. Innes, aquarist and photographer
- Amile Jefferson, former college basketball player, Duke Blue Devils 2015 national championship team
- Raymond Lohier, United States Court of Appeals judge and former U.S. Assistant Attorney for the Southern District of New York
- Hilary D. Marston, former Chief Medical Officer of the Food and Drug Administration
- Mildred Scott Olmsted, peace activist
- Elizabeth Osborne, artist
- Brian De Palma, film director
- Benj Pasek, Tony, Grammy, and Oscar-winning songwriter, Pasek and Paul, Dear Evan Hansen, The Greatest Showman, La La Land (film), A Christmas Story: The Musical, Dogfight, NBC's Smash, Johnny and the Sprites
- Daniel J. Porter, former OMGPOP chief executive officer, Draw Something creator, and former Teach For America president
- Frederick Taylor Pusey, former Pennsylvania State Representative
- K. Barry Sharpless, Nobel Laureate in Chemistry, 2001 and 2022
- Sonya Sklaroff, artist
- Stacey (Goldsborough) Snider, former DreamWorks chief executive officer
- Hakim Warrick, professional basketball player, Phoenix Suns, Chicago Bulls, Milwaukee Bucks, Memphis Grizzlies, former NCAA Player (Syracuse University, member of 2003 NCAA Men's Basketball Championship team
- Mustafa Shakur, professional basketball player, Washington Wizards
- Ty Stiklorius, Emmy award-winning film and television producer, music executive, and philanthropist
- George Washington Tryon Jr., malacologist
- Sylvia Williams, former director, Smithsonian Institution's National Museum of African Art
- James Wolfenden, U.S. Congressman
- Julian Shapiro-Barnum, actor and comedian
- Brooke Averick, author, comedian and podcaster

== See also ==
- List of Friends Schools
