= 1956 Philadelphia City Council special election =

Philadelphia's City Council special election of 1956 was held to fill the seat vacated by Democrat John F. Byrne, Sr. when he resigned to join the Pennsylvania Turnpike Commission. Democrat Leon Kolankiewicz defeated Republican Max Leon for the seat.

== Election ==
Under Philadelphia's city charter, seven city council at-large seats were created, of which two were guaranteed to the minority party. After the 1955 elections, one of those seats was occupied by Democrat John F. Byrne, Sr. The following year, Governor George M. Leader appointed Byrne to a seat on the Pennsylvania Turnpike Commission. Byrne resigned his council seat, and a special election was called to replace him.

The Democrats selected Leon Kolankiewicz, a state representative and president of the local chapter of American Relief for Poland. The Republicans chose Max Leon, a local impresario and businessman who owned the WDAS (AM) radio station. Both candidates had Polish roots: Leon was a Polish-Jewish immigrant who had left Poland at age 16, while Kolankiewicz was the son of Polish Catholic immigrants.

== Results ==
Kolankiewicz was elected with a 140,000-vote majority. He continued to serve on City Council until 1967.

Philadelphia City Council special election, 1956
Party	Candidate	Votes	%
Democratic	Leon Kolankiewicz	488,111	58.29
Republican	Max Leon	349,326	41.71

== See also ==
- List of members of Philadelphia City Council since 1952

== Sources ==
- "Leon swamped by Kolankiewicz". Philadelphia Inquirer. November 7, 1956. p. 2.
