= Leon Kolankiewicz =

American politician (1892–1971)

Member of the Pennsylvania House of Representatives

Personal details
- Born: April 6, 1892 Philadelphia, PA, U.S.
- Died: June 1971 (age 79)
- Party: Democratic
- Education: Drexel Institute, Pennsylvania State College of Optometry

Military service
- Allegiance: United States
- Branch/service: United States Army
- Battles/wars: World War I

Leon Kolankiewicz (April 6, 1892 – June 1971) was a Democratic politician from Philadelphia.

Kolankiewicz was born in Philadelphia in 1892, the son of Polish immigrants Lawrence and Catherine Kolankiewicz. Kolankiewicz grew up in Philadelphia's Germantown neighborhood. He attended the Drexel Institute (now Drexel University) and the Pennsylvania State College of Optometry (now Salus University) en route to earning a doctorate in optometry. When the United States entered World War I in 1917, Kolankiewicz joined the United States Army, serving in the Machine Gun Company of the 315th Infantry. He was wounded in action, for which he received the Purple Heart.

After the war, Kolankiewicz continued his work as an optometrist while becoming active in Philadelphia's Polish-American community. He was married in 1923 to Helen Lojewska, with whom he had four children. Kolankiewicz was appointed president of the Philadelphia chapter of American Relief for Poland in 1929, coordinating that group's efforts with those of international organizations helping to send money and supplies to the newly created Polish state.

In 1940, Kolankiewicz entered the political arena, winning election to the state House of Representatives as a Democrat. He won reelection in 1942 and 1944, but was defeated in 1946. In 1948, he regained his seat and held it until 1956. In that year, Kolankiewicz ran in a special election for one of seven at-large seats on the Philadelphia City Council, which had become vacant after the resignation of John F. Byrne Sr. He defeated Max Leon, his Republican opponent, easily. Kolankiewicz was the first Polish-American to serve on the City Council. In 1959, he won reelection to a full term on the council. He testified before a grand jury investigating graft in City Council in 1963, but was not charged. Kolankiewicz resigned as president of the Philadelphia chapter of American Relief for Poland in 1964 in order to better concentrate on his duties as a councilman. In 1967, he lost his bid for reelection to city council, and retired from public life. He died four years later, at the age of 79.

== Sources ==
- "KOLANKIEWICZ, Leon J." (PDF). House Historical Biographies. Pennsylvania House of Representatives.
- "Leon swamped by Kolankiewicz". The Philadelphia Inquirer. November 7, 1956. p. 2.
- Trachtman, Joseph H.; McAdams, Leonard J. (June 4, 1963). "2 Councilmen Testify in Probe of $4000 Gift". The Philadelphia Inquirer. p. 1 – via Newspapers.com.
- "Leon J. Kolankiewicz (1892-1971)" (PDF). The Historical Society of Pennsylvania. February 2006.
- Miller, Joseph H. (November 4, 1959). "Dilworth Is Re-Elected by 203,000 Over Stassen". The Philadelphia Inquirer.
