= Mina SayWhat =

American radio and TV personality

Mina "SayWhat" Llona (born April 28th, 1990), from New Jersey, is an American radio and television personality, best known for her work as a radio host for Sirius-XM. She previously worked as a host for WRNB 100.3 and WUSL 98.9.

== Career ==
Mina SayWhat began working in radio at 18 years old in 2008. She has various career highlights and has had the chance to have many different famous guests on her shows, such as Nas, Lupe Fiasco, ASAP Rocky, Meek Mill, Lil Nas X, and Young Jeezy.

=== SiriusXM ===
Mina began working for SiriusXM as a programmer but eventually moved on to become a host. She currently hosts the radio show The Heat (Sirius XM) on SiriusXM and SiriusXM Canada.

=== Spotify ===
She has a podcast on Spotify called Mina's House that focuses on the music industry.

=== Power Squad ===
Mina founded a female dance group called the Power Squad.

== Accolades ==
- Cover Of Syracuse Magazine
- John Bayliss Radio Scholar
