= Preston & Steve =

- Genre: Comedy, Talk, Rock
- Running time: 4+ hours
- Country of origin: United States
- Home station: WMMR (Philadelphia)
- Hosted by: Preston Elliot; Steve Morrison
- Starring: Casey Foster; Marisa Magnatta
- Produced by: Marisa Magnatta; Ryan Shuttleworth
- Executive producer: Casey Fosbenner
- Recording studio: Bala Cynwyd, Pennsylvania, U.S.
- Original release: 1998 on Y100/Y100 (Except February 23, 2005 - May 23, 2005)
- Website: prestonandsteve.com
- Podcast: prestonandsteve.libsyn.com

Preston & Steve is a morning radio, comedy, and variety broadcast on Philadelphia's active rock station 93.3 FM WMMR. The show features DJs Preston Elliot and Steve Morrison. The show originated at WDRE and then on Y100, both in Philadelphia, and features daily telephone interviews, in-studio guests, celebrity impersonations, unusual news stories, and numerous sound clips and running gags. It broadcasts live on the radio as well as streaming audio via the station website from 6 a.m. to 10:30 a.m. ET Monday through Friday, and is a featured podcast in the comedy section of the iTunes Store.

== History ==
Preston Elliot, Steve Morrison, and Marilyn Russell were among a group of radio personalities introduced to the Philadelphia market through the now defunct radio station WDRE. With several of their WDRE co-workers, they departed the station for Y100 in 1997 when WDRE changed format. After four years of The Y100 Morning Show with Preston, Marilyn, and Steve, Marilyn Russell left the morning show on March 1, 2002, citing family reasons. She has worked part-time on other stations in the Philadelphia area since then, including WMGK, SoJo 104.9, WYSP, and joined morning personality Dave Cruise as co-host on "The BENFM Morning Show on 95.7 in 2007.

In 2001, WPLY's owner, Dan Lerner, one of the last independent owners in the Philadelphia market, sold the station to Radio One, a national broadcasting corporation that acquired Preston, Marilyn & Steve's previous radio station 103.9 WDRE. Radio One and hosts Elliot and Morrison did not successfully negotiate a new contract, and the personalities agreed to a deal with local broadcasting group Greater Media. The hosts' contract with Radio One expired on February 24, 2005, and Y100 changed format and became WPHI "The Beat" the same day.

A legal battle between Radio One and the Elliot and Morrison team over the hosts' non-compete clause was resolved by a ruling that they were no longer in competition with WPLY. On May 23, 2005, their new show debuted on WMMR.

In 2006, Elliot and Morrison received a long-term contract extension and in 2008, the station gave them a new 1,800-square-foot (170 m^{2}) studio with their own production equipment.

They signed multi-year extensions in 2011 and in 2019. In May 2022, their contract with WMMR was extended to 2030.

On May 8, 2025, an on-air show announcement revealed that Kathy Romano would no longer be a part of the show or an employee of WMMR due to cuts by parent company Beasley Media Group.

On November 26, 2025, 21-year member of the show Nick Mcilwain announced he would be leaving the show and WMMR for personal reasons. That day’s broadcast was his final appearance on the show as a member. A subsequent shuffling of personnel resulted in Marisa Magnatta moving from a more production-centric role in the control room into a more prominent role among the core on-air personalities in-studio, with her spot in the control room being taken by newly-added producer Ryan Shuttleworth.

== On-air staff ==
Preston Elliot
- Born: Preston Elliot Wilson; January 25, 1968 (age 58); St. Louis, Missouri, U.S.
- Other name: Kenny Knight
- Spouse: Rachelle
- Children: 3, Parker, Carter, and Caleb

Steve Morrison
- Born: June 12, 1959 (age 67); Long Island, New York, U.S.
- Spouse: Clare

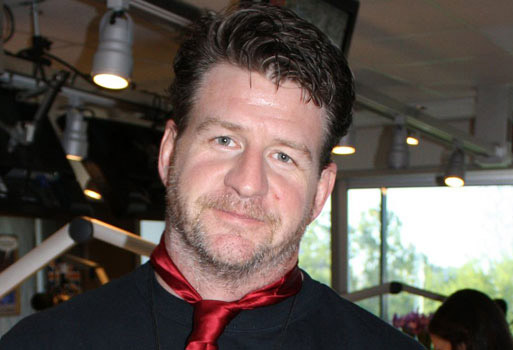
Preston Elliot, co-host

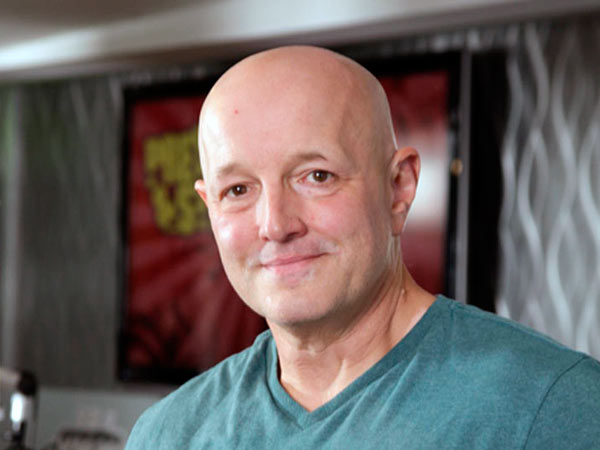
Steve Morrison, co-host

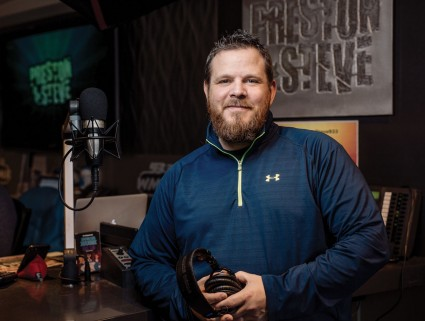
Casey Foster, executive producer

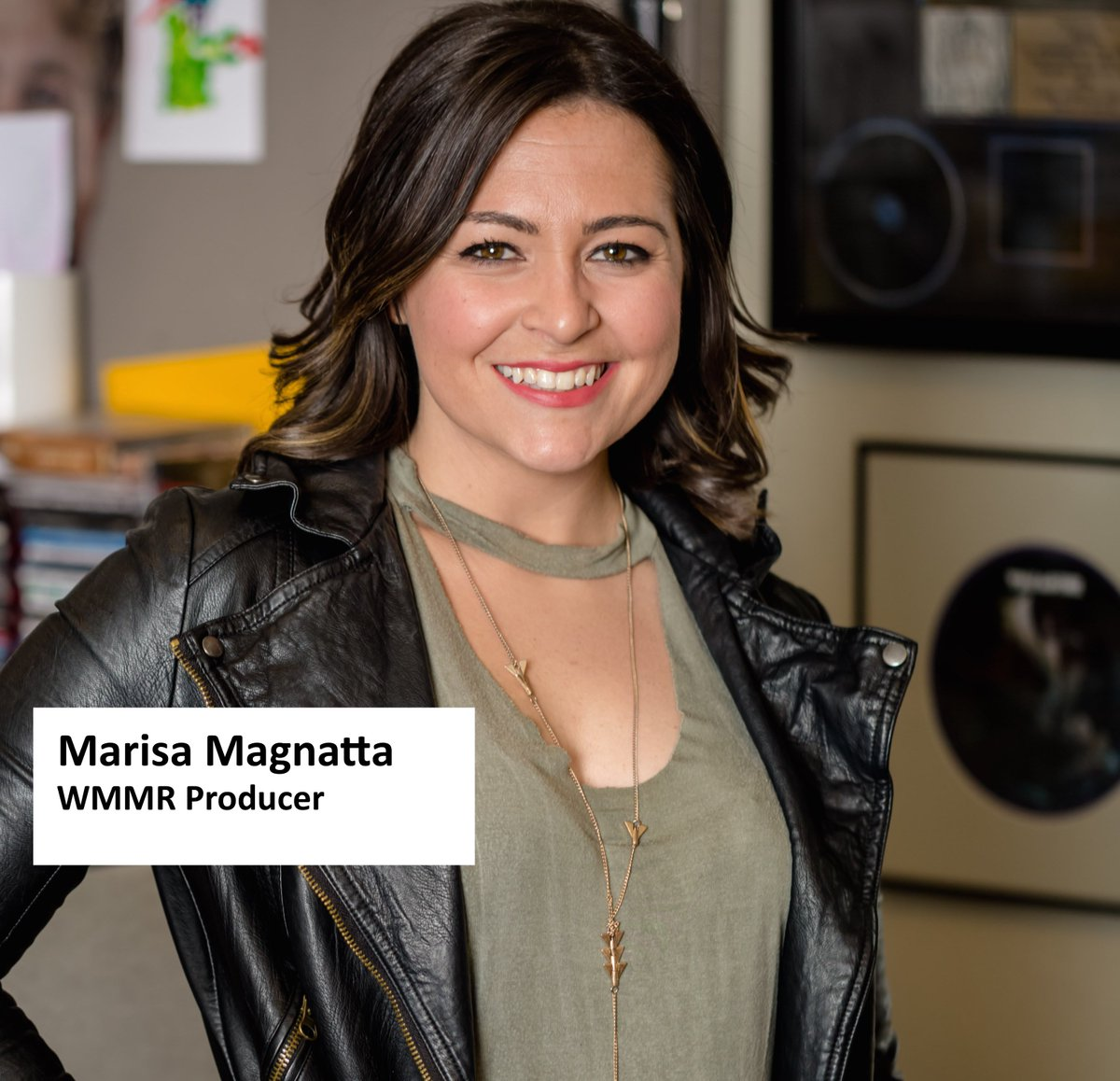
Marisa Magnatta, executive producer

== Awards and ratings ==
The show has been named the "Best Morning Show" by Philadelphia Style magazine, and "Personality/Show of the Year" in the active rock category by Radio & Records trade magazine. Before switching to WMMR, the show won various Philadelphia A.I.R. Awards, including the "Best Weekday Morning Team" award for 2001, 2002, 2003, and 2005, and was voted best local morning show in the country in FMQB's Year End Leaders Poll for 2004 and 2005 in two different formats.

In the Summer 2004 Arbitron ratings book, the show was rated fourth in market share for all people ages 18–34, and second for men in the same category. The Preston & Steve show's ratings surpassed Howard Stern's during his last month on the air, and they outranked each of David Lee Roth's, Opie and Anthony's, and Kidd Chris's tenures at WYSP. As of 2009, Preston & Steve was the top rated show in Philadelphia, and over a four-year period, they had the #1 show in the Arbitron ratings for the 25–54 adult demographic a total of 42 times.

In 2014, Elliot and Morrison were nominated by the National Association of Broadcasters as finalists for the NAB Marconi Radio Awards for Major Market Personality of the Year.

On June 11, 2019, Elliot and Morrison were honored by The National Association of Broadcasters Leadership Foundation, receiving the 2019 Service to Community Award in acknowledgement of the Camp Out for Hunger

On November 22, 2019 The Broadcast Pioneers of Philadelphia inducted the duo into their Hall of Fame.

In August 2021, it was announced that Preston Elliot and Steve Morrison will be inducted to the Radio Hall of Fame, being nominated under the “Spoken Word On-Air Personality” category.

== Publicity events ==
=== Camp Out for Hunger ===
Since 1998, the show has held an annual Camp Out For Hunger, in which both Elliot and Morrison live in a motorhome for one week in November to raise food for Philabundance. The show awards prizes to individuals and groups that donate the most food. Since 1998, the event has collected thousands of tons of food and raised millions of dollars to feed the hungry across the Delaware Valley.

Results

Year	Tons of Food	US Dollars
2005	87.4	$10,000
2006	151	$18,337
2007	232	$27,427
2008	223	$40,540
2009	187	$45,000
2010	264	$64,119
2011	288	$80,000
2012	313	$106,000
2013	386	$240,522
2014	420	$110,518
2015	580	$158,995
2016	683	$74,870+
2017	839	$272,683
2018	913	$198,188
2019	1,339	$200,000
2020	1,268	$1,743,232
2021	1,167	$1,802,237
2022	1,410	$1,340,254
2023	878	$1,158,732
2024	830	$995,710
2025	921.6	$1,635,637

=== 10,000 marbles ===
To celebrate the anticipated 10,000th loss in Philadelphia Phillies franchise history, executive producer Nick McIlwain rolled 10,000 marbles down the steps of the Philadelphia Museum of Art as Bill Weston, WMMR's program director, looked on. After being cleaned up by the show's production crew, the marbles were donated to Toys for Tots and Children's Hospital of Philadelphia.

=== "Totally Office Calendar" ===
In 2006, Elliot had a slip of the tongue while trying to say "awesome" and instead said "office". Later that year they announced that they would be releasing a calendar featuring one (sometimes two) woman a month. Lauren Harris had been the only woman to appear in the calendar every year, until the 2015 calendar, when other commitments kept her from participating (she returned to appear in the 2016 Calendar). Release of the Calendar is typically accompanied by a "Totally Office Calendar Party", which can draw thousands of participants to see the women depicted in the Calendar in person and receive signed copies of the Calendar. There was no Calendar shoot nor a release party for 2020 due to the COVID-19 pandemic restrictions. Instead, a 2021 "Totally Office Calendar" poster featuring past photos from previous Calendars was created and was given to anyone that made a drive-through donation at the 2020 Camp Out for Hunger. The Calendar poster was later made available through the station's "Rock Shop" store on their website for the apropos price of $9.33.

=== "I Bleed for Preston & Steve" blood drive ===
This annual blood drive is hosted by Preston & Steve in coordination with the American Red Cross. The event typically attracts a very large crowd, and various promotional items and free concert tickets are often given out. The 2011 blood drive, the sixth annual drive, collected a total of 1,174 units of blood, and gives them a 6-year total of 6,409 units. The 2016 (11th annual) drive collected a total of 1,297 units of blood.

== In popular culture ==
- Elliot and his wife Rachelle were featured in the first episode of Season Five on Trading Spaces.
- Morrison and his wife Claire were featured on an episode of the HGTV show Spice Up My Kitchen where their kitchen was redone for a budget of $40,000.
- Producer Casey Foster and his wife Diane were featured on an episode of the HGTV show Bad, Bad Bath (later retitled Save My Bath) which premiered on October 17, 2006.
- Reporter Kathy Romano had appeared on an episode of the third season of The Simple Life, commenting that the producers present on a Greyhound bus had to "spoon-feed" every line of dialogue to Paris Hilton.
- Romano appeared in the 2009 film The Mighty Macs as a gate agent. The film is produced by Pat Croce and is about an all girl Catholic college basketball team.
- Foster signed a one-day contract with the Philadelphia Soul.
- Foster and McIlwain appeared in two episodes of It's Always Sunny in Philadelphia, and Romano appeared in the season three episode "Dennis Looks Like a Registered Sex Offender." Both Elliot and Morrison appeared in season 4 episode 3, playing construction workers, alongside several Philadelphia Eagles. Steve's role was originally to include one line ("Uh, yeah... I guess?"), but was shortened ("What?"), Preston's role had no lines. They were also featured as themselves in the episode "Mac's Big Break".
- Foster appeared in the 2010 documentary film Bazaar of All Nations about a unique and influential shopping center in Delaware County, Pennsylvania.
- Morrison and Magnatta appear on an episode of Diners, Drive-ins and Dives in 2011, where host Guy Fieri visits the Memphis Taproom in the Kensington neighborhood of Philadelphia.
