= Pusey =

Pusey may refer to:

== People ==
- Caleb Pusey (c. 1650–1727), friend and business partner of William Penn
- Chris Pusey (born 1965), Canadian ice hockey player
- Edward Bouverie Pusey (1800–1882), English churchman
- Ernest Pusey (1895–2006), World War I veteran and oldest living person in Florida
- Frederick Taylor Pusey (1872–1936), member of the Pennsylvania House of Representatives
- Jacqueline Pusey (born 1959), Jamaican sprint athlete
- Jason Pusey (born 1989), Gibraltarian footballer
- Joshua Pusey (1842–1906), American inventor of the paper matchbook
- Mavis Pusey (1928–2019), Jamaican-born painter
- Merlo J. Pusey (1902–1985), American biographer
- Nathan Pusey (1907–2001), American educator and 24th president of Harvard University (1953–1971)
- Philip Pusey (1799–1855), English agriculturalist and Member of Parliament
- Philip E. Pusey (1830–1880), English Aramaist
- Peter Pusey (born 1942), British physicist
- Stephen Pusey (born 1952), British-born artist
- Tim Pusey (born 1992), Australian darts player
- William A. Pusey (1865–1940), American physician and past president of the American Medical Association.
- William Henry Mills Pusey (1826–1900), U.S. Representative

== Places ==
- Pusey, Haute-Saône, a commune of the Haute-Saône département in France
- Pusey, Ontario, a community in the township of Highlands East, Ontario, Canada
- Pusey, Oxfordshire, a small village with stately home, in Oxfordshire, England
- Pewsey, a village in Wiltshire, England

== See also ==
- Pusey and Jones, a former American shipbuilder and industrial-equipment manufacturer
- Pusey House, Oxford, an Anglican religious institution
- Pusey Street, Oxford, England
