= Frederick Pusey =

Frederick Pusey may refer to:

- Fred Pusey (1909–1983), British film art director and production designer
- Frederick Taylor Pusey (1872–1936), politician from Pennsylvania
