= Gene Shay =

American radio personality (1935–2020)

- Born: Ivan Shaner; March 4, 1935; Philadelphia, Pennsylvania, U.S.
- Died: April 17, 2020 (aged 85); Lower Merion Township, Pennsylvania, U.S.
- Presenting career
- Network: WXPN
- Style: Folk music
- Country: United States

Gene Shay (born Ivan Shaner; March 4, 1935 – April 17, 2020) was an American radio personality. Shay was born in Philadelphia, Pennsylvania, to a Jewish family and was a representative of the city's folk music scene. Beginning in 1962, he produced a weekly folk radio shows on WXPN, which was last broadcast on February 1, 2015. He previously hosted shows on WDAS-FM, WMMR, WIOQ and WHYY-FM.

A founder of the annual Philadelphia Folk Festival and its emcee since its inception, he has been called the "Dean of American folk DJs" by the Philadelphia Daily News and "The Grandfather of Philadelphia Folk Music" by The Philadelphia Inquirer. Shay also served as a host for the online "Folk Alley" stream originating at Kent State University station WKSU and carried on WXPN's website.

== Career ==
Some of his early recorded interviews with Joni Mitchell, Jackson Browne, John Denver, Tom Waits, Phil Ochs, Bonnie Raitt, and Judy Collins were bootlegged.

Shay was the first to bring Bob Dylan to Philadelphia in 1963 for his debut concert. As an advertising writer and producer, he wrote the original radio commercials for Woodstock. He helped design the famous "smiling banjo" logo for the Philadelphia Folk Festival and years later came up with the name World Cafe for the nationally syndicated series produced by WXPN and distributed by National Public Radio.

For a few years he edited and published Singer-Songwriter, a newsletter that had subscribers in the United States, Canada, and Japan.

== Awards and achievements ==
He received a lifetime achievement award from the Delaware Valley Music Poll in 1994 and was inducted into Temple University's Radio, TV & Theater Hall of Fame on October 25, 2005.

He was a partner in Sliced Bread Records and produced a number of folk music collections for that label. The most notable may have been What's That I Hear, The Songs Of Phil Ochs, a tribute album featuring Phil Ochs songs interpreted by more than a score of popular folksingers, and the Philadelphia Folk Festival 40th Anniversary Anthology, a historic four CD collection of recorded Festival performances from Pete Seeger, Bonnie Raitt, Fairport Convention, John Prine, Arlo Guthrie and many others. The Moses Rascoe Blues album he produced for Flying Fish Records was considered for a Grammy nomination.

Shay served as a Charter Board Member of the North American Folk Alliance, served on the Board of Sing Out! Magazine, the national folk music quarterly founded by Woody Guthrie and Pete Seeger in the late 1940s, and he was a voting member on the Board of Governors of NARAS in Philadelphia.

== Death ==
Shay died from COVID-19 in Lower Merion Township, Pennsylvania, on April 17, 2020, at the age of 85.
