= Sonya Sklaroff =

American artist

- Sonya Sklaroff Five Water Towers at Dusk
- Born: November 7, 1970 (age 55); Philadelphia, USA
- Education: Friends' Central School, Rhode Island School of Design (RISD) & Parsons School of Design
- Known for: Painting
- Website: sonyasklaroff.com

== Biography ==
Sonya Sklaroff, born on November 7, 1970, in Philadelphia, is a contemporary American painter renowned for her cityscapes of New York City. Her educational journey began at Friends' Central School and led her to the prestigious Rhode Island School of Design (RISD), where she earned her Bachelor of Fine Arts. At RISD, she won the Providence Art Award and was selected for the European Honors Program, studying under Friedrich St. Florian. Sklaroff later achieved her Master of Fine Arts from the Parsons School of Design in New York City, where she studied under luminaries such as Faith Ringgold and Glenn Goldberg. During her time at Parsons, she received a grant from the Port Authority of New York and New Jersey, which provided her with an artist's studio on the 91st floor of Tower 1 of the World Trade Center.

== Artistic Style and Technique ==
Sklaroff's early works were primarily representational views of cityscapes and landscapes, emphasizing the relationship between negative space, complementary colors, and the contrast between light and dark. Her work from the World Trade Center in 1999 utilized the vertical format of the windows to frame her views of the city.

Her more recent works, while still exploring these themes, have delved into greater detail and prominently feature scenes with figures and rooftops. A 2009 New York exhibition of Sklaroff's work was praised for its unique color contrasts, light reflections, shadow depictions, and atmospheric qualities. Although she has painted various landscapes and interiors, she is particularly renowned for her depictions of New York City, especially her portrayals of the city's water towers, which exude an almost anthropomorphic character. Many of her landscape paintings originate from Maine or the American Southwest, and she has been an artist in residence at the Santa Fe Art Institute. Sklaroff continues the longstanding tradition of artists painting on Monhegan Island, Maine, a remote location she visits annually.

Sklaroff describes herself as a "creative athlete", painting and drawing daily as both a mental and physical regimen to maintain her artistic prowess. While her work is figurative, she emphasizes the abstract shapes within a scene. In an interview with the Providence Journal, she expressed her fascination with New York's unique architectural landscape and the challenges of capturing the ever-changing effects of light.

== Notable Works and Exhibitions ==
Collections featuring Sklaroff's work include the Phillips Museum of Art, the United States Department of Homeland Security, Fannie Mae, the Dana–Farber Cancer Institute, the Cahoon Museum of American Art, the Consul General of France (in New York City), and the Art Bank Program of the US State Department.

One of Sklaroff's paintings graced the cover of the Summer 2009 issue of City Journal magazine. Another of her artworks was showcased on the cover of Ravi Shankar's Voluptuous Bristle in April 2010. Sklaroff was also featured in "New American Paintings: 15th Anniversary Edition", published in early 2010 by Open Studios Press. Her artistry is further highlighted in a series of cards from Bayview Press.

In 2016, a multimedia stage show titled Jazz on the West Side incorporated projections of Sklaroff's paintings. This performance showcased jazz renditions of songs from "West Side Story", choreographed by Sue Samuels. Sklaroff exhibited her work at Sparts Gallery in Paris curated by her agents G&O Art in March 2016 and returned for New York Portraits Part VI: Metropolis in Repose in March 2018, marking her sixth solo show at the gallery. Her art was also displayed at the Galerie Anagama in Versailles, France in early 2015 and again for a solo exhibition in October 2017, her third at the venue., all curated by her agent G&O Art -

In 2014, an artist monograph detailing Sklaroff's work was published in France, under the curation of G&O Art featuring a foreword by Harlan Coben, an admirer and collector of her pieces. The North American release followed in 2015. Sklaroff also held a solo exhibition at Galerie Ferrari in Vevey, Switzerland in 2018 curated by her Agent G&O Art. In 2020, her work was spotlighted on the blog of The New School, which highlighted her pandemic-themed paintings and showcased photographs of her art displayed on 3,500 digital kiosks from LinkNYC throughout New York City. Her artwork was again featured on LinkNYC’s digital kiosks in 2021 and is set for another showcase in May 2023.

In December 2020, Sklaroff was interviewed by All Arts, the award-winning arts and culture hub created by the WNET Group. She also holds a prominent position in the award-winning documentary film "Chuck Connelly: Into the Light".

== Teaching ==
Sklaroff is an associate professor of Drawing and Painting at Parsons School of Design in New York City.

== Media Appearances ==
- Sklaroff was interviewed by MyArtSpace.com in November 2007.
- She was later the subject of an eight-page article in the April 2010 issue of American Artist magazine.
- A Sklaroff exhibition in Versailles was featured in the May 2011 issue of ELLE magazine.
- Sklaroff was featured in a 2-page spread in the Fall/Winter 2019/2020 issue of RISD XYZ magazine.
- Sklaroff is interviewed in Gala Lutteroth's short documentary film Water from Above, released in May 2012.
- She is also featured in Pierre Oertel's documentary film, New York Art City.
- In 2017 she was featured in the first issue of Moriarty magazine.
- In 2022 Sklaroff was interviewed by Alicia Quarles on Good Morning America about her Pandemic Painting series.
- In 2022 Sklaroff was the first female artist to be commissioned to paint the first female member, Cornelia Otis Skinner of the exclusive club, The Lambs, in New York City.
- In December 2020, Sklaroff was interviewed by All Arts, the award-winning arts and culture hub created by the WNET Group.
- And she is prominently featured in the award-winning documentary film Chuck Connelly: Into the Light.
- She was mentioned in AND JUST LIKE THAT, Season 2 Episode 4, by actor Victor Garber, whose art-dealer character mentions that Charlotte (Kristin Davis), who formerly ran a gallery, discovered Sonya Sklaroff.
