= Jim McGuinn =

American radio personality (born 1966)

- Born: February 13, 1966 (age 60); Aurora, Illinois
- Occupations: Program director, radio show host

Jim McGuinn, born James Slusarek, is an American radio personality. He served as program director of the now defunct Y100 100.3FM (1997–2005) and its predecessor, WDRE in Philadelphia, Pennsylvania (1995–97), both of which changed formats after being bought by Radio One. McGuinn also served as program director for KPNT (1994–95), St. Louis, and WEQX (1990–94), Manchester, Vermont, beginning his career in commercial radio as a DJ at WWRX (1988–90), Providence, following time at his college radio station, WPGU (1984–88), Champaign, Illinois.

McGuinn took the Y100 brand online in 2004 with Y100Rocks.com, meant to serve as the internet reincarnation of Y100 after the public outcry that took place online after the station's modern rock format was abandoned. In August 2006, McGuinn merged Y100Rocks into WXPN's family of programming.

In April 2007 McGuinn became the afternoon drive time host for WXPN, following the World Cafe program by David Dye. He also served as the program director for Y-Rock On XPN, which exists both as programming on WXPN as well as a full-time internet radio operation.

McGuinn was program director from January 2009 until his departure in April 2022 of Minnesota Public Radio's 89.3 The Current. In August 2022, it was announced that McGuinn would return to WXPN as Assistant Program Director.

== Radio career as a Program Director ==
=== As Program Director for Y-Rock On XPN ===
McGuinn was responsible for merging the Y100Rocks brand with the executives at WXPN, chiefly Roger LaMay and Bruce Warren. The unique merging of the Y100Rocks brand into the WXPN family of programming occurred on August 30, 2006. The deal worked such that Y100Rocks continued under the moniker "Y-Rock On XPN" and while it would continue to broadcast on the internet 24/7, it would also be broadcast on WXPN 88.5FM in Philadelphia on Wednesday, Thursday and Friday nights. The shows that simulcast on WXPN are hosted no longer by McGuinn as he now serves as the WXPN afternoon host.

With the merging of the two brands, McGuinn had succeeded in finding a permanent home for the displaced expatriates of Y100, who had been broadcasting online out of various apartment complexes in Philadelphia since Radio One silenced WPLY in February 2005. The executives at WXPN provided the Y-Rock staff - led by McGuinn as Program Director and run by a largely volunteer staff - with studio and office space in their University of Pennsylvania-provided headquarters at 3025 Walnut Street in Philadelphia.

In January 2009, McGunn became program director and host at Minnesota Public Radio's 89.3 The Current.

== Musical career ==
Prior to and concurrent with a career in radio, McGuinn played in rock bands, starting in high school and college as guitarist and songwriter with Reaction Formation, an '80s era indie rock band that toured the Midwest extensively and released several 7" singles and cassettes, some for Go2 Records, a subsidiary of Minneapolis-based Susstones Records. McGuinn later played with short-lived acts 100 Faces, The Glitter Zombies (with Ric Menck and Paul Chastain of Velvet Crush), and Love Cactus. While with Love Cactus, McGuinn co-founded Trashcan Records with bandmate Chris Corpora. Trashcan released a series of cassettes that documented the fertile Champaign, Illinois, music scene of the late '80s, including early work from Jay Bennett's pre-Wilco band Titanic Love Affair, Bad Flannel, and Poster Children's Toreador Squat, which McGuinn also co-produced.

After college, McGuinn appeared in more bands, most prominently as bassist with Philadelphia-based Cordalene, who released 3 EPs and a full-length album, The Star-Ledger, between 2000 and 2004. Currently musical activities include membership in Philadelphia musical collective The Wayward Wind; McGuinn plays lapsteel and mandolin on their second album, Wait for Green.
