= Ed Sciaky =

American radio personality (1948–2004)

Edward Sciaky
- Born: Edward Leon Sciaky; April 2, 1948; New York City, U.S.
- Died: January 29, 2004 (aged 55); New York City, U.S.
- Presenting career
- Style: Disc jockey

Edward Leon Sciaky (April 2, 1948–January 29, 2004) was an American rock radio disc jockey who spent his broadcasting career in the Philadelphia area.

== Early life and education ==
He was born in New York City and raised in Philadelphia, where he graduated from Central High School, and then from Temple University where he majored in mathematics.

== Career ==
Sciaky became known for promoting new talent, helping establish the careers of scores of artists, most notably Bruce Springsteen, Billy Joel, David Bowie, Janis Ian, and Yes. Sciaky can also be heard introducing AC/DC on the Live from the Atlantic Studios CD off their 1997 boxset, Bonfire.

He was friends with Billy Joel, who released the album Cold Spring Harbor. Sciaky featured it on one his Sigma Sound Studios broadcasts.

Sciaky provided the master tape of Yes's live version of The Beatles' "I'm Down" for the band's 1992 Yesyears box set.

Sciaky's broadcasting career, all in the Philadelphia area, included WRTI, WHAT, WXUR, WDAS, WMMR, WIOQ, WYSP, WMMR (again), and WMGK.

In 2003, Sciaky's Sunday With Springsteen specialty show won a "Best Of Philly" award from Philadelphia magazine.

The Broadcast Pioneers of Philadelphia posthumously inducted Sciaky into their Hall of Fame in 2005.

== Personal life ==
Sciaky lived on the Main Line, near Philadelphia. His house was home to a substantial, well-organized music collection, as well as a rather large iguana, perhaps five feet long. The resting iguana would sometimes startle first time guests when it moved slightly and caught their attention.

He was married to Judy (Feldshur) Sciaky from 1969 until his death. They had one child in 1985, Monica, an opera singer with a doctorate in vocal arts, who married Eiki Isomura, who has his doctorate in conducting and is the son of violist Kazuhide Isomura.

== Death ==
Sciaky died of complications from diabetes on January 29, 2004, in New York City, at the age of 55. E Street drummer Max Weinberg and singer-songwriter Steve Forbert served as pallbearers at his funeral, which was attended by 1500 people.
