= WPHI-FM =

Radio station in Jenkintown, Pennsylvania

Simulcast of KYW, Philadelphia
- Jenkintown, Pennsylvania; United States
- Broadcast area: Philadelphia metropolitan area
- Frequency: 103.9 MHz
- Branding: KYW Newsradio 103.9

Programming
- Language: English
- Format: All-news radio
- Affiliations: ABC News Radio; Associated Press; Bloomberg Radio; WCAU

Ownership
- Owner: Audacy, Inc.; (Audacy License, LLC)
- Sister stations: KYW; WBEB; WIP-FM; WOGL; WPHT; WTDY-FM

History
- First air date: November 1, 1960
- Former call signs: WIBF (1960–1965); WIBF-FM (1965–1996); WDRE (1996–1997); WPHI-FM (1997–2005); WPPZ-FM (2005–2016)
- Call sign meaning: Philadelphia

Technical information
- Licensing authority: FCC
- Facility ID: 30572
- Class: A
- ERP: 270 watts
- HAAT: 338 meters (1,109 ft)
- Transmitter coordinates: 40°2′30″N 75°14′10″W

Links
- Public license information: Public file; LMS
- Webcast: Listen live (via Audacy)
- Website: www.audacy.com/kywnewsradio

WPHI-FM (103.9 MHz) is a commercial radio station licensed to Jenkintown, Pennsylvania, and serving the Philadelphia metropolitan area. The station is owned by Audacy, Inc., simulcasting an all-news radio format with co-owned KYW (1060 AM). Its studios are located in Audacy's corporate headquarters in Center City, Philadelphia, and its transmitter is in the Roxborough neighborhood.

This station began broadcasting as WIBF on November 1, 1960, and was owned for 32 years by the Fox family. It had a variety of formats in its early years but in the mid-1970s settled on weekday daytime Christian and Jewish programming and programming for ethnic communities in foreign languages at night and on weekends. The Fox family sold the station in 1992 to Jarad Broadcasting, which switched the format to modern rock as a simulcast of the company's WDRE in Garden City, New York, one of seven stations nationally that formed the "Underground Network". The simulcast arrangement was unwound in 1995, and the WDRE call sign moved to Philadelphia in 1996 with the station becoming a locally based modern rocker.

Radio One acquired WDRE in late 1996 and relaunched the station as WPHI-FM "Philly 103.9" with an urban contemporary format in February 1997. WPHI shifted to rhythmic Top 40 as "The Beat" in 2002 before switching formats and frequencies with 100.3 MHz in 2005. This station then became WPPZ-FM "Praise 103.9", an urban gospel station. WPPZ's programming moved to 107.9 MHz in 2016, and 103.9 again became an urban station as WPHI-FM.

In 2020, Radio One swapped four stations to Entercom, predecessor of Audacy, in exchange for the company's cluster in Charlotte, North Carolina. On November 23, Entercom began programming this frequency as a simulcast of KYW's all-news format.

== History ==
=== WIBF-FM ===
The station signed on the air November 1, 1960. Its original call sign was WIBF-FM and it was owned by Fox Broadcasting. The call letters stood for the station's owners, brothers William and Irwin Fox and their father Benjamin Fox, a local real estate developer.

In the 1960s and 1970s, the station featured a format of MOR, big bands, Dixieland jazz and the area's first FM country music show, plus religious and ethnic programs. By the mid-1970s, the station switched to Christian radio and ethnic programming during the day and Spanish-language tropical music at night. The Barry Reisman Show, featuring Jewish music and talk, was broadcast during the afternoon drive time from 1969 through the station's sale in 1992. In 1965, the station picked up a television sister in WIBF-TV, channel 29 (now Fox Television Stations-owned WTXF-TV, unrelated to the Philadelphia Fox family).

=== WDRE ===
103.9 WDRE logo

In October 1992, the station was sold by the Fox family to Jarad Broadcasting. On November 9, 1992, at midnight, co-owned WDRE from Garden City, New York, started simulcasting its modern rock programming with WIBF-FM. WIBF's branding was changed to "103.9 WDRE" to match the New York station. The simulcasting was part of a large effort by Jarad called "The Underground Network", a group of seven stations from across the country simulcasting WDRE. In 1995, the network ceased operations, as WDRE in New York changed its call letters back to WLIR. The cessation of the network then made WIBF-FM in Philadelphia an independent, local modern rock station. WIBF-FM then changed its own call sign to WDRE - "We DaRE to be Different" - to match its branding.

WDRE used the slogan "Philly's Modern Rock". "Alive" by Pearl Jam was the first song played on WDRE.

The station helped launch the careers of several famous disc jockeys and broadcasters. They include Preston Elliot and Steve Morrison of the Preston and Steve morning show on WMMR, Bret Hamilton of WCAU-TV, Marilyn Russell (formerly of Y100, WXPN, WMGK, and WOGL), Jim McGuinn (also known as Rumor Boy), the former Program Director of WPLY, and Mel "Toxic" Taylor, who went on to WYSP. Taylor (formerly of WPST and WIFI) was the first DJ hired for the only two shows that were live from Philadelphia each week.

When WDRE Philadelphia became a local radio station in 1995, talent was hired from within the city (e.g. Bret Hamilton, formerly of WIOQ) and outside of the city. While WDRE never became a true mainstream radio station in the Philadelphia radio market due to its weak signal, the station gained a cult status. As a result, events like the station's music festival (known as "DREfest") sold out to a crowd of over 25,000 people.

=== Sale to Radio One ===
In December 1996, Radio One acquired WDRE from Jarad, and on December 16, WDRE announced that the station would flip to a then-undisclosed format in February 1997.

With the pending format flip, the staff at WDRE organized a concert called "Bitterfest", which was to be held at The Electric Factory. The concert featured local acts G Love and the Fun Lovin' Criminals, and was created to celebrate the life of WDRE as a local institution for modern rock. On February 7, 1997, "Bitterfest" was held to a sold-out crowd of over 3,000 people, with all of the WDRE staff present at the event. At midnight on February 8, 1997, as the crowd at "Bitterfest" chanted "'D-R-E! 'D-R-E! 'D-R-E!", a lucky (or unlucky) listener was selected to "pull the plug" on WDRE, with the station ending with the first song that started the format: Pearl Jam's "Alive". Two of the WDRE disc jockeys (Preston Eliot, Bret Hamilton) went to Y100, as did 'DRE Program Director Jim McGuinn, and midday and Sunday night DJ Marilyn Russell (as Promotions Director for Y100). Y100 was also bought out by Radio One in 2000, and flipped in 2005 to urban contemporary.

=== Urban and gospel ===
On February 10, 1997, after a weekend of stunting with classic soul music, the station flipped to urban contemporary, branded as "Philly 103-9". The call letters were soon changed to WPHI. When the station rebranded as "The Beat" in April 2002, it shifted to rhythmic top 40. By 2006, Radio & Records/Nielsen BDS moved it to the urban contemporary panel. Mediabase followed suit in 2011, completing the rhythmic to urban shift.

logo as Praise, 2005-2016

On February 27, 2005, Radio One moved the "Beat" format to the 100.3 frequency, which was formerly Y100. 103.9 then flipped to urban gospel, branded as "Praise 103.9". The call sign was changed to WPPZ-FM on March 3.

Except for "The Yolanda Adams Morning Show" and CeCe McGhee weekday afternoons, the station ran without DJs throughout the day until August 2007. In late August, the addition of performer Lonnie Hunter from Chicago was named the midday personality along with Sheik Meah. Motivational speaker Les Brown was added on Sundays from 7–9pm. In September, Pastor Alan E. Waller joined the staff to do a Saturday morning show from 10–11:00 and two more weekend shows were added. The "Holy Hip-Hop Show" was added on Saturdays from 7–9pm and a Christian dating show was added on Sundays from 9–11pm.

WPPZ's staff includes Lonnie Hunter, Brother Marcus, and CeCe Magee. Former DJs include Church Lady (2007–2008), Ed Long (2005–2007), CoCo Brother (2011–2013), and Les Brown and B.I.G. C.I.T.Y. (2008–2009; 2009–present).

=== "Boom"; hip hop ===
On September 27, 2016, at midnight, WPPZ and WPHI swapped frequencies, with "Praise" moving to 107.9 FM, and "Boom" moving to 103.9 FM. It also marked the return of the WPHI call letters to the frequency that originated the call letters. With the change, WPHI's classic hip hop format shifted to urban contemporary; the classic hip hop songs were reduced to just a few per hour, with the station now emphasizing currents and recurrents. This marks the fourth attempt by Radio One to compete against long dominant WUSL.

Eight months after WPHI's format switch, WISX flipped to a classic hip hop-leaning rhythmic AC on June 30, 2017. On December 24, 2019, WPHI rebranded as "Hip Hop 103.9".

=== Entercom/Audacy ===
On November 5, 2020, Urban One announced that it would swap WPHI-FM, WHHL and the intellectual property of WFUN-FM in St. Louis, and WTEM in Washington, D.C. to Entercom, in exchange for WBT/WBT-FM, WFNZ and WLNK in Charlotte, North Carolina. Under the terms of the deal, Entercom would take over operations of WPHI-FM under a local marketing agreement (LMA) on November 23, and flip it to a simulcast of KYW. Ahead of the change, the "Hip Hop" format and branding moved to WRNB on November 16, and the two stations simulcast for a week. The change in ownership and format took place at midnight on November 23. The swap was consummated on April 20, 2021. The WPHI call letters were retained to prevent competitor re-use (Nielsen's measurement systems no longer require specific callsign verification by panelists).

== See also ==
- WLIR — the original "WDRE" from 1987 to 1996, at 92.7 FM in Garden City, New York
- WXPN-HD2
