= El Hispano =

- "La Voz Latina del Nuevo Milenio"
- Type: Weekly
- Format: Tabloid
- Publisher: López Publications, Inc.
- Editor: Aaron G. Lopez
- Founded: 1978
- Language: Spanish
- Headquarters: Upper Darby Township, Pennsylvania
- City: Philadelphia
- Country: United States
- Circulation: 521,236
- Website: http://el-hispano.com
- Free online archives: http://el-hispano.com/edicion-digital/

El Hispano is a Spanish language newspaper serving Southeastern Pennsylvania. It was established in 1976 and is published weekly on Thursdays.

El Hispano serves Greater Philadelphia, as well as Allentown, PA, Reading, PA, Camden, NJ, and Trenton, NJ, all of which have large Hispanic populations.

== See also ==
- Media in Philadelphia
- Media in the Lehigh Valley
- List of Spanish-language newspapers published in the United States
