= Hilary D. Marston =

American physician-scientist and policy advisor

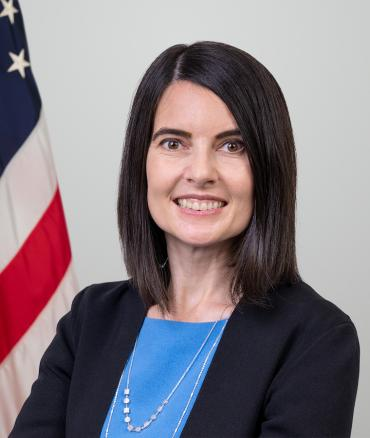
- Hilary D. Marston
- Education: Yale College (BA); University of Pennsylvania (MD); Harvard University (MPH)
- Scientific career
- Fields: Pandemic preparedness, clinical trial innovation, regulatory policy, global health
- Workplaces: Food and Drug Administration

Hilary D. Marston is the former Chief Medical Officer of the Food and Drug Administration.

== Career ==
Marston worked for McKinsey & Company and at the Bill & Melinda Gates Foundation as a program officer and special assistant. She then studied medicine at the Perelman School of Medicine and completed her residency in internal medicine and Global Health Equity at Brigham and Women's Hospital and earned her M.P.H. at the Harvard T.H. Chan School of Public Health. In 2013, Marston joined National Institute of Allergy and Infectious Diseases (NIAID), as a medical officer and policy advisor for global health and pandemic preparedness.

In 2021, Marston joined the United States National Security Council as director for medical and biodefense preparedness. She then served as director for global COVID-19 response on the White House COVID-19 Response Team. In this role, she led the US government's work in global distribution of COVID-19 vaccines, including overseeing sharing from the domestic supply and large-scale vaccine purchases for international donation.

In 2022, Marston joined the US Food and Drug Administration as Chief Medical Officer. In this role she oversaw the Office of the Chief Medical Officer which guides efforts to ensure timely review of combination products, incentive programs to promote interventions for rare diseases, and dedicated labeling for pediatric patients. She provided executive leadership, coordination, and oversight of FDA cross-cutting clinical and public health emergency-related regulatory policy matters, and public health preparedness and response activities on behalf of the Commissioner.

During her tenure, Marston helped shape FDA work on real-world data in collaboration with other health agencies, honed ethics frameworks for modern research approaches and harmonized clinical research terminology. Marston left the FDA in 2025.

== Selected works ==
- Warraich, HJ; Marston, HD; Califf, RM (8 February 2024). "Addressing the Challenge of Common Chronic Diseases - A View from the FDA". The New England Journal of Medicine. 390 (6): 490–492. doi:10.1056/NEJMp2313217. PMID 38314843.
- Rivera, Donna R.; Cutler, Tracy L.; McShane, Lisa; Meeker-O’Connell, Ann; Marston, Hilary D.; Califf, Robert M.; Bertagnolli, Monica M.; Avilés-Santa, Larissa; Ayalew, Kassa; Bayha, Ryan; Chetta, Joshua; Concato, John; Culp, Michelle; Dodd, Lori; Facey, Natasha; Forshee, Richard; Freedman, Andrew; Friedman, Philipa; Golfinopoulos, Elisa; Grandinetti, Cheryl; Jarman-Miller, Hannah; Jorgenson, Lyric; Karesh, Alyson; Kline, Lydia; Kluetz, Paul G.; Kraus, Stefanie; Lee, Jennifer J.; Lerro, Catherine C.; Levenson, Mark; Li, Jie; Lu, Yun; Moore, Céline; Ordóñez, Anna E.; Potter, Gail; Prindiville, Sheila; Rosenberg, Yves; Sarosy, Gisele; Shapley, Stephanie; Smith, Emily R.; Talley, Anne; Tamburro, Robert; Viviano, Charles; Yongpravat, Charlie (17 June 2025). "Modernizing Research and Evidence Consensus Definitions: A Food and Drug Administration–National Institutes of Health Collaboration". JAMA Network Open. 8 (6): e2516674. doi:10.1001/jamanetworkopen.2025.16674. PMID 40526378.
- Abbasi, AB; Layden, J; Gordon, W; Gregurick, S; DeLew, N; Grossman, J; Bierman, AS; Monarez, S; Curtis, LH; Viall, AH; Rocca, M; Rivera, DR; Marston, H; Mugge, A; Smith, SR; Bent, K; Macrae, J; Sheehy, A; Wegrzyn, RD; Valdez, RB; Johnson, C; Bush, L; Blum, J; Cohen, MK; Bertagnolli, MM; Califf, RM; Tripathi, M (25 March 2025). "A Unified Approach to Health Data Exchange: A Report From the US DHHS". JAMA. 333 (12): 1074–1079. doi:10.1001/jama.2025.0068. PMC 11936714. PMID 39826091.
- Califf, Robert M.; Meeker-O’Connell, Ann; Targum, Shari; Marston, Hilary (20 May 2025). "Recent Updates to the Declaration of Helsinki: A View from the U.S. Food and Drug Administration". Therapeutic Innovation & Regulatory Science. doi:10.1007/s43441-024-00734-2. PMID 40392410.
- Califf, RM; Cutler, TL; Marston, HD; Meeker-O'Connell, A (2025). "The importance of ClinicalTrials.gov in informing trial design, conduct, and results". Journal of clinical and translational science. 9 (1): e42. doi:10.1017/cts.2025.9. PMC 11975776. PMID 40201648.
- Paules, Catharine I.; Marston, Hilary D.; Eisinger, Robert W.; Baltimore, David; Fauci, Anthony S. (October 2017). "The Pathway to a Universal Influenza Vaccine". Immunity. 47 (4): 599–603. doi:10.1016/j.immuni.2017.09.007. ISSN 1074-7613. PMID 29045889.
