= WRFF =

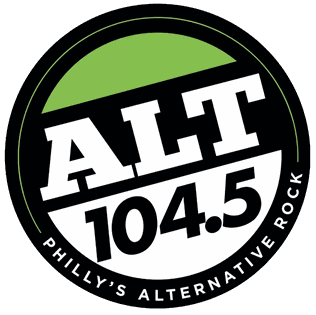
- Philadelphia, Pennsylvania; United States
- Broadcast area: Philadelphia metropolitan area
- Frequency: 104.5 MHz (HD Radio)
- Branding: Alt 104-5

Programming
- Format: Alternative rock
- Subchannels: HD2: Simulcast of WDAS "The Gambler" (sports)
- Affiliations: Compass Media Networks; iHeartRadio; Premiere Networks

Ownership
- Owner: iHeartMedia; (iHM Licenses, LLC)
- Sister stations: WDAS; WDAS-FM; WIOQ; WUMR; WUSL

History
- First air date: February 1965; 61 years ago (as WRCP-FM)
- Former call signs: WRCP-FM (1965–1977); WSNI (1977–1990); WYXR (1990–1999); WLCE (1999–2002); WSNI (2002–2006); WUBA (2006–2007)
- Call sign meaning: "Radio 104.5" (previous branding); could also sound like "riff"

Technical information
- Licensing authority: FCC
- Facility ID: 53969
- Class: B
- ERP: 11,500 watts (analog); 458 watts (digital)
- HAAT: 308 meters (1,010 ft)
- Transmitter coordinates: 40°2′30.4″N 75°14′22.6″W

Links
- Public license information: Public file; LMS
- Webcast: Listen live (via iHeartRadio)
- Website: alt1045philly.iheart.com

WRFF (104.5 MHz, "ALT 104-5") is a commercial FM radio station in Philadelphia, Pennsylvania. The station is owned by iHeartMedia, and broadcasts an alternative rock radio format. The studios are in Bala Cynwyd.

WRFF has an effective radiated power (ERP) of 11,500 watts. The transmitter tower is in the Roxborough section of Philadelphia at (40°2′30.9″N 75°14′21.9″W). WRFF broadcasts using HD Radio technology. The HD-2 digital subchannel carries the sports radio format of sister station WDAS 1480 AM "The Gambler".

== History ==
=== WRCP-FM ===
The station first signed on in February 1965. The original call sign was WRCP-FM, simulcasting co-owned WRCP (1540 AM) and its middle of the road (MOR) format. The stations were owned by Associated Communications, a subsidiary of the Rust Craft Greeting Card Company.

In 1967, the stations switched to a country music format. Because the AM station was a daytimer, required to go off the air at sunset, WRCP-FM was able to continue the format into the evening. Tightened Federal Communications Commission (FCC) restrictions on AM-FM simulcasting led to a new format for the FM in 1977.

=== Sunny 104.5 ===
WRCP-FM broke away from WRCP (AM) in 1977 and became WSNI. WSNI initially had a soft country/easy listening hybrid format. Over time, the country music was largely discontinued and the station evolved into a standard easy listening sound.

On January 1, 1980, WSNI became known as Sunny 104 at first, then later Sunny 104 1/2, and eventually Sunny 104.5, a name which was reused later in the station's history. Eventually, "Sunny" ended easy listening in favor of an adult contemporary format playing the Top 40 hits of the 1960s, Top 40/Adult contemporary crossovers of the 1970s, and the Adult Contemporary hits of the 1980s, including current product.

Six years later, the stations were sold to Pyramid Broadcasting. The AM sister station, which still had the WRCP call sign, was eventually spun off and got a new call sign. In 1988, singer Teddy Pendergrass, a Philadelphia native, was hired to perform some of WSNI's jingles.

=== Star 104.5 ===
On December 10, 1990, WSNI's call sign was changed to WYXR and the format switched to hot AC. The new station rebranded as Star 104.5.

In a group deal, WYXR was acquired by Evergreen by 1993. The station experimented and leaned toward Adult Top 40 in 1996, but kept the "Star" branding. The station quietly evolved back to hot AC in 1997. WYXR played more rhythmic cuts than most hot AC stations. In 1997, WYXR was acquired by Chancellor Media as a result of a merger.

In April 1999, Chancellor (known then as AMFM, Inc.) was going to switch the station to a Jammin' Oldies format. But the flip did not happen because another station, WXXM, owned by Greater Media, beat them to it.

=== Alice 104.5 ===
The Hot AC format remained until November 4, 1999, at noon. After playing Madonna's "Who's That Girl", the station began stunting with the sound of a heartbeat for the next three hours. At 3 p.m. that same day, the station flipped to a gold-based "rock AC" format, branded as Alice 104.5, WLCE. The first song on "Alice" was The Cars' "Let's Go". The new format was described as "Rockin' Hits" of the 70s, 80s, and 90s.

The "Rockin' Hits" format was designed to compete against Greater Media's WMGK. WMGK was Greater Media's most successful station in Philadelphia at the time, and this was viewed as "punishment" against Greater Media after it flipped WXXM to "Jammin' Gold". Initially, only a couple of current songs were played, but by 2001, the station was playing a larger number. By late 2001, the station evolved to more of a rock-based hot AC format. Also in 2001, as a result of a merger, WLCE came under the ownership of Clear Channel Communications (now iHeartMedia).

=== Return to Sunny ===
On August 1, 2002, at 6 a.m., after a 24-hour loop of The Beatles' "Here Comes the Sun", 104.5 flipped to soft adult contemporary, reverting to the Sunny 104.5 branding with a plan to compete for some of "B101" WBEB's listeners. The first song on Sunny was "Build Me Up Buttercup" by The Foundations.

This incarnation of WSNI is noted for completely abandoning the format in the first week in November to play all Christmas music until December 26. The idea was very successful and starting the very next year, B101—-which in years past played only 36 hours of continuous Christmas music on Christmas Eve and Day-—copied it and has done it every year since.

Nearly all air personalities on "Sunny" were voicetracked, meaning the "DJ banter" heard between songs had been recorded in advance in another city and was being played from a hard drive just like the music. The low operating costs helped the station be successful even with only middling ratings. "Sunny 104.5" continued for just over four years.

=== Rumba 104.5 ===
At noon on August 10, 2006, Sunny's sister station WJJZ (106.1 FM) was switched to a rhythmic AC format, and began identifying itself as "Philly's 106.1". At the same time, Clear Channel dumped WSNI's soft AC format and started "shadowcasting" the new station at 106.1. The two stations were playing the same songs, but 104.5 was delayed by several seconds from what was heard on 106.1. The last song heard on "Sunny" was "Don't Let the Sun Go Down On Me" by Elton John. This was followed by a short pause and a slow fade in of "Let's Get It Started" by The Black Eyed Peas. There was a short announcement from a female ("This feels like my own radio station") and an awkward segue into "Get Ready For This" by 2 Unlimited, then Michael Jackson's "Wanna Be Startin' Somethin'".

As for the lucrative all-Christmas format Sunny brought to Philadelphia, B101 had it all to themselves. Without having to worry about beating the competition to the punch, they tended to make the switch to all-Christmas much later in the season, typically one day to one week prior to Thanksgiving. In 2007, during Arbitron's "holiday period", the lack of competition provided B101 enormous rating success. In 2008, three other stations joined in, giving Philadelphia four all-Christmas stations and forcing B101 to share.

On August 23, 2006, at noon, after 13 days of shadowcasting the 106.1 FM signal, 104.5 FM became a Spanish-language radio station branded as Rumba 104.5. The first song on "Rumba" was "Puerto Rico" by Frankie Ruiz.

The new format focused primarily on tropical and Spanish dance music, similar to WCAA and WSKQ-FM in New York City. On August 29, WSNI changed call letters to WUBA to match the "Rumba" branding. (Note: In early January 2007, the WSNI call sign went to the former WOQL-FM in Keene, New Hampshire.) Despite being the first Spanish-language station on FM radio in Philadelphia, "Rumba" would only last nine months. (The "Rumba" name and format were moved to WDAS (1480 AM), where it lasted until 2011; it was then resurrected on WUMR (106.1 FM) in 2022.)

=== Alternative rock ===
On May 16, 2007, Clear Channel flipped the station to modern rock as Radio 104-5 with the new call letters WRFF, returning the format to Philadelphia after the 2005 flip of WPLY. Concurrently, the Rumba format moved to co-owned WDAS (1480 AM). WRFF solicited suggestions from listeners on artists to be featured in the new format, and the Radio branding and format would be adopted by several other Clear Channel-owned stations.

On May 26, 2020, the station rebranded as Alt 104-5 with no change in format, aligned with the current standardized Alt branding used by iHeartMedia modern rock stations.

==== Birthday Show ====
Starting in 2017, the station has hosted an annual birthday show one-day music festival, featuring artists frequently played on 104.5 FM.

Between 2007 and 2019, the festival has hosted artists like Hozier, Death Cab for Cutie, Florence and the Machine, Passion Pit and others. The festival is usually held in either Camden, New Jersey or Philadelphia.
