= Wynne Alexander =

American author, journalist, composer, and documentary filmmaker

- Born: Wynne Alexander
- Occupations: Author, investigative journalist, composer, documentary filmmaker
- Writing career
- Language: English
- Genres: Civil rights, history, music, investigative journalism
- Notable works: Get It From The Drums, Jazz in the City: The Legends of Philadelphia’s Jazz Machine
- Notable awards: Coat-of-Arms Award (Black Marines of New Jersey); City Council Award – Filmmaking Resolution; Church of the Advocate Excellence in Filmmaking – Caring for Children Award
- Website: www.wynnealexandermedia.com

Wynne Alexander is an American author, investigative journalist, composer, and documentary filmmaker.

She is the author of the civil rights history book, Get It From The Drums, which became the first musically infused Civil Rights curriculum in the United States. The book also includes a 15-song CD produced by Alexander to accompany the text, and features interviews with and music by Buffy Sainte-Marie, Pete Seeger, Janis Ian, Judy Collins, and Kenny Gamble. Other leading artists featured on the CD are Marvin Gaye, James Brown, Nina Simone, Buffalo Springfield, Curtis Mayfield and Creedence Clearwater Revival, Edwin Starr, Country Joe and the Fish, The Chambers Brothers, Barry McGuire, Phil Ochs, The O’Jays and Harold Melvin and the BlueNotes. The book's historical narrative also included in-depth interviews with Mrs. Thurgood Marshall and Adam Clayton Powell, III. She also wrote Jazz in the City: The Legends of Philadelphia’s Jazz Machine, chronicling Philadelphia's contributions to jazz history along with producing a 10-song CD which accompanies the text.

Her career in broadcasting began in her late teens as an anchor and political reporter at WDAS AM-FM Radio in Philadelphia, Pennsylvania. United States senator Robert P. Casey Jr. called her "a leading voice for social justice" and the Pennsylvania legislature commended her "life's work at the intersection of music, civil rights and journalism." Noted for her investigative journalism and civil rights advocacy, Alexander has interviewed Coretta Scott King, Muhammad Ali, Rosa Parks, Buffy Sainte-Marie, Ambassador Andrew Young, Chilean president Michelle Bachelet, and Egypt's Madame Jehan Sadat.

As a founding member of Latino Lines, she was involved in the Latino voting rights and redistricting battle in Pennsylvania from 2011 to 2013. Alexander writes and curates the civil rights history website WDASHistory.org.

She is also a musician, international recording artist, and composer with music critic A.D. Amorosi of The Philadelphia Inquirer writing "Alexander's haughty, smoky sound took into consideration the grainy bass quiver of Bryan Ferry, the heady romanticism of Billy Strayhorn, and the blues-imbued jazz classicism of Hazel Scott - sometimes all at once" of her cabaret show in 2007. A reviewer from the Philadelphia City Paper wrote of her work, "With hints of Marlene Dietrich, Bryan Ferry and Al Green in her voice and a sentimentality lacking in all things saccharine, the new CD is hard, classically tinged, boisterous cabaret-blues that never lacks in divine elegance."

== Awards and honors ==
- Coat-of-Arms Award from the Black Marines of New Jersey
- City Council Award – Filmmaking Resolution
- Church of the Advocate Excellence in Filmmaking – Caring for Children Award

== Filmography ==
Mini-Documentary films written and directed by Alexander:

- Inspiration from the Nation Toughest Streets: The Lighthouse
- One Good Idea Made a World of Difference
- Rescuing Quality Education for All
- Turning Points for Children
- Latino Civil Rights and Empowerment
