= WRNB =

Urban adult contemporary radio station in Philadelphia

- Media, Pennsylvania; United States
- Broadcast area: Philadelphia metropolitan area
- Frequency: 100.3 MHz (HD Radio)
- Branding: 100.3 RNB

Programming
- Language: English
- Format: Urban adult contemporary
- Subchannels: HD2: Urban contemporary "100.3 HD2 R&B and Hip Hop"; HD3: Urban contemporary gospel "Philly's Favor 100.7"

Ownership
- Owner: Urban One; (Radio One Licenses, LLC)
- Sister stations: WPPZ-FM

History
- First air date: November 8, 1982
- Former call signs: WKSZ (1982–1993); WPLY (1993–2005); WPHI (2005–2011)
- Call sign meaning: "Rhythm and blues"

Technical information
- Licensing authority: FCC
- Facility ID: 25079
- Class: B
- ERP: 17,000 watts (analog); 650 watts (digital)
- HAAT: 259 meters (850 ft)
- Transmitter coordinates: 40°2′36.4″N 75°14′31.6″W
- Translator: 100.7 W264BH (Mount Holly, New Jersey)

Links
- Public license information: Public file; LMS
- Webcast: Listen live; Listen live (HD2); Listen live (HD3)
- Website: rnbphilly.com; wrnbhd2.com (HD2); phillysfavor.com (HD3)

WRNB (100.3 FM) is a commercial radio station licensed to Media, Pennsylvania in the Philadelphia metropolitan area radio market. It is owned by Radio One and airs an urban adult contemporary radio format. In afternoon drive time, WRNB carries the syndicated D. L. Hughley Show. WRNB's studios and offices are in the Two Bala Plaza– building on City Line Avenue in Bala Cynwyd.

WRNB has an effective radiated power (ERP) of 17,000 watts. The transmitter is located in the Roxborough neighborhood of Philadelphia at (40°2′36.0″N 75°14′32.0″W). The station is short-spaced with two other co-channel FM stations (see See § Signal note below). WRNB broadcasts in the HD Radio hybrid format, with its HD-2 subchannel airing the urban contemporary format that moved from its main signal, and the HD-3 subchannel airing an urban contemporary gospel format.

== History ==
=== Prior stations on 100.3 FM ===
In 1942, a station broadcasting on 100.3 FM first signed on as KYW-FM, which was licensed to Philadelphia. It was the sister station to KYW, owned by the Westinghouse Electric Corporation. By the late 1940s, KYW-FM moved to 92.5 MHz. The 100.3 frequency remained dark for a decade and a half.

In 1962, WXUR-FM began broadcasting, licensed to the suburban community of Media. Its effective radiated power was 4,200 watts, simulcasting the Christian programming of its AM sister station 690 WXUR (now WPHE in Phoenixville, Pennsylvania). WXUR-AM-FM were owned by Carl McIntire, a Bible Presbyterian minister.

In 1973, the Federal Communications Commission (FCC) revoked the licenses for both stations, with the FCC ruling that WXUR-AM-FM violated the Fairness Doctrine, refusing to air competing viewpoints. The 100.3 frequency then went silent again for eight years.

=== 1981-1993: Adult contemporary ===
In 1981, after a seven-year comparative hearing, the FCC awarded the license to the Greater Media Radio Company, owned by Daniel Lerner. The name referred to the station's city of license, Media, and was not associated with the larger Greater Media, Inc., which locally owned WMGK, WPEN and other stations around the U.S. On November 8, 1982, 100.3 FM returned to the air, this time as WKSZ, "Kiss 100," with a soft adult contemporary format. By 1987, Kiss 100 was the No. 1 Arbitron-ranked station among women ages 25 to 54.

In the early 1990s, however, the battle for AC listeners heated up, with WEAZ (now WBEB) becoming the dominant station for soft music in Philadelphia. WKSZ lost ground in the ratings, falling to 17th place in 1992. To improve ratings, WKSZ tried to combine AC and oldies with what the station called the "50/50 Mix"; however, this failed to turn ratings around, and in 1993, WKSZ returned to a playlist of AC love songs.

=== 1993-2005: Alternative rock ===
On March 15, 1993, at 6 a.m., with the station still struggling, WKSZ became "Z100", switching to an adult top 40 format. The flip came three days after Eagle 106 gave up Top 40 and switched to smooth jazz, creating an opening which WKSZ hoped to fill. New York's WHTZ, located on the same frequency of 100.3 MHz, and calling itself "Z100" since 1983, demanded that WKSZ drop the name to avoid listener confusion. After a brief legal battle, the call sign and name were changed to WPLY, "Y100".

The station initially had a slight alternative rock lean, but still played other Top 40 hits, including pop and dance. By early 1995, WPLY evolved into a full-time alternative rock format, which lasted nearly ten years. Through the late 1990s, WPLY leaned towards modern AC, and would shift towards an active rock lean in 2000.

In 2000, the station was bought by Radio One for $80 million. Radio One focused mostly on urban music and did not plan to program an alternative rock station. The company tried to make a deal to swap formats with Greater Media's WEJM (now WBEN-FM), which at the time, ran a rhythmic oldies format called "Jammin Gold", which would have better fit into Radio One's portfolio. The deal fell through, and Radio One continued to run WPLY as an alternative rock station for nearly five years. While ratings had gone down, the station still was moderately successful.

=== 2005-2011: Urban contemporary ===
On February 24, 2005, at 11:50 pm, WPLY ended its alternative rock format with "Alive" by Pearl Jam (which was also the first and last song on WDRE). WPHI, an urban contemporary station at 103.9 MHz, also owned by Radio One and known as "103.9 The Beat," moved to 100.3 FM. The station at 103.9, in turn, flipped to urban gospel as WPPZ-FM, "Praise 103.9". By 2006, Nielsen BDS/Radio & Records moved WPHI to the urban contemporary panel. Mediabase followed suit in 2011. WPHI-FM's chief rival was WUSL, which had been Philadelphia's long-time Urban Contemporary leader.

In fall 2005, former rival personality Colby Colb was hired as the Program Director and afternoon host. For the next few years, 100.3 The Beat enjoyed high ratings, helped by Miss Jones in the morning and Colby Colb in the afternoon. Monie Love and Pooch took over mornings in 2005, with other disc jockeys on the station including Micheal Shawn, DJ Touchtone, DJ Jay Ski, Megatron, DJ Bent Rock, Moshay, Toshamakia, DJ JDS, Laiya and Hansoul. In late 2010, WPHI-FM became the Philadelphia home of the Star and Buc Wild Morning Show, syndicated from New York City. The show had actually been heard in Philadelphia in early 2006 on WUSL but had drawn some controversy and was dropped.

=== 2011-2013: R&B ===
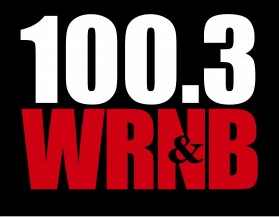
Logo as "100.3 WRNB" from 2011 to 2013

On August 27, 2011, WPHI dropped the "Beat" moniker for "100.3 Philly." Radio One was preparing to make another frequency switch, this time moving WRNB's urban AC format and branding from 107.9 MHz to 100.3 MHz on September 1. WRNB was simulcast on both 100.3 and 107.9 until September 2, when the WPHI call sign moved to 107.9, adopted the former "Beat" format and rebranded as "Hot 107.9."

=== 2013-2016: Classic R&B ===
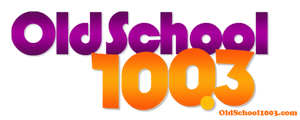
Logo as "Old School 100.3" from 2013 to 2016

On March 29, 2013, WRNB went jockless and began promoting a "big announcement" at 5 p.m. on April 1. At that time, after playing "Keep Your Head to the Sky" by Earth, Wind, & Fire, WRNB flipped to urban oldies as "Old School 100.3." The first song on "Old School" was "Atomic Dog" by George Clinton.

The format played Motown, disco, funk, new jack swing, freestyle, and early hip hop from the 1960s to the early 2000s. The new format was designed to better compete with the dominant Urban AC station in Philadelphia, WDAS-FM.

In November 2014, sister station WPHI-FM moved to a classic hip-hop format. In response, WRNB re-added some current music, although the station continued to focus on older urban hits.

=== 2016-2020: R&B ===
On October 6, 2016, WRNB returned to urban adult contemporary music, once more calling itself "100.3 WRNB," and dropping the "Old School" branding.

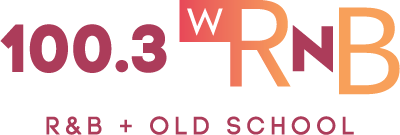
Logo as "100.3 WRNB" from 2016 to 2019

=== 2020-2022: Urban contemporary ===
On November 16, 2020, at 10 am, WRNB absorbed sister station WPHI's urban contemporary format into its own and was rebranded as "100.3 R&B & Hip Hop" (subsequently, WRNB's urban adult contemporary format would move full-time to its HD2 sub-channel). This was a result of Urban One selling said station to Entercom; the two stations simulcasted for a week, as it had been previously announced that WPHI would begin simulcasting KYW ahead of the sale's closure, on November 23.

=== 2022–present: R&B ===
With the combined R&B/hip hop format failing to catch on in the market - bottoming out with a 1.0 share in the July 2022 Nielsen Audio ratings (well behind WUSL's 3.6 share), the station ultimately reverted to its previous urban AC format and "100.3 RNB" branding on August 25, 2022. With the shift, Program Director/afternoon host Paris Nicole exited the station after twelve years; Nicole previously served in the same position at WPHI and moved over at WRNB with the previous format shift.

== Signal note ==
WRNB is short-spaced to two other co-channel Class B stations: WHTZ Z100 (licensed to serve Newark, New Jersey) and WBIG-FM Big 100 (licensed to serve Washington, D.C.). The cities WRNB and WHTZ are licensed to serve are only 86 miles apart, while the cities WRNB and WBIG-FM are licensed to serve are only 112 miles apart. The minimum distance between two Class B stations operating on the same channel according to current FCC rules is 150 miles.

== History of WRNB call sign ==
Beginning in the 1950s, the call sign WRNB was licensed to North Carolina's first full-time rock 'n roll radio station, a 1000-watt outlet in New Bern located at AM 1490 (now sports radio WWNB). WRNB 1490 was also famous for being one of the first radio stations to play Carolina Beach Music.
