= Frederick Taylor Pusey =

American politician

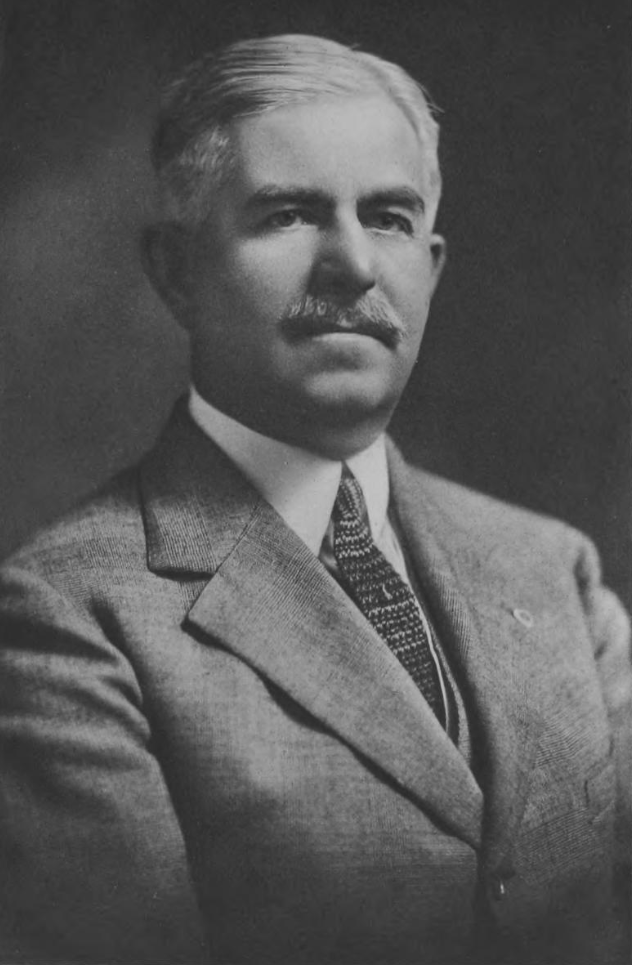

Member of the Pennsylvania House of Representatives from the Delaware County district
- In office 1903–1906
- Preceded by: Robert M. Newhard
- Succeeded by: John Milton Lutz

Personal details
- Born: June 3, 1872 Philadelphia, Pennsylvania
- Died: September 6, 1936 (aged 64) Philadelphia, Pennsylvania
- Party: Republican
- Spouse: Nellie Oglivie (m. 1895)
- Occupation: Military officer, lawyer, politician
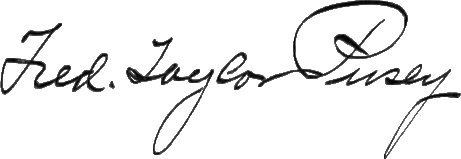
- Signature

Frederick Taylor Pusey (June 3, 1872 – September 6, 1936) was an American politician from Pennsylvania who served as a Republican member of the Pennsylvania House of Representatives for Delaware County from 1903 to 1906.

== Early life and education ==
Pusey was born in Philadelphia on June 3, 1872. His primary education was in the public schools in Avondale, Pennsylvania. He graduated from Friends Central High School in 1899.

== Military career ==
He served in the Pennsylvania National Guard from 1892 to 1918. He was a member of the First Regiment from 1892 to 1906 and served in the Spanish–American War. He served as aide-de-camp to Governor Edwin Sydney Stuart from 1907 to 1912 and to Governor John K. Tener in 1913. He served with the American Expeditionary Forces in World War I from 1917 to 1918.

== Civilian career ==
He worked as an assistant manager in a hosiery mill for two years, and later worked as an industrial life insurance collector. He was a lawyer and solicitor for the borough of Lansdowne, Pennsylvania (1899–1900) and served as president of the Law Academy of Philadelphia.

== Political career ==
He served two terms in the Pennsylvania House of Representatives (1903–04 and 1905–06) representing Delaware County as a Republican. He did not run for re-election in 1906.

In 1903 he introduced an "anti-cartoon" bill in the legislature. The bill would have made it illegal for publishers to print cartoons depicting politicians as animals. It was inspired by a series of cartoons depicting the 1902 candidate for governor, Samuel Pennypacker, as a parrot. The bill did not become law, but it inspired a whole new series of cartoons depicting politicians as vegetables and inanimate objects.

== Personal life ==
In 1895, Pusey married Nellie Oglivie and together they had one child.

He died at Naval Hospital Philadelphia on September 6, 1936, and is buried in Cumberland Cemetery in Media, Pennsylvania.

Pennsylvania House of Representatives
Preceded by Robert M. Newhard	Member of the Pennsylvania House of Representatives, Delaware County; 1903–1906	Succeeded by John Milton Lutz
