= WDAS-FM =

Urban adult contemporary radio station in Philadelphia

- Philadelphia, Pennsylvania; United States
- Broadcast area: Philadelphia metropolitan area
- Frequency: 105.3 MHz (HD Radio)
- Branding: 105.3 WDAS-FM

Programming
- Language: English
- Format: Urban adult contemporary
- Subchannels: HD2: WTEL simulcast (Black Information Network)
- Affiliations: Premiere Networks

Ownership
- Owner: iHeartMedia; (iHM Licenses, LLC)
- Sister stations: WDAS, WIOQ, WRFF, WUMR, WUSL

History
- First air date: September 1, 1959
- Call sign meaning: Dannenbaum and Steppacher (previous owners of the AM sister station)

Technical information
- Facility ID: 71316
- Class: B
- ERP: 16,500 watts
- HAAT: 266 meters (873 ft)
- Transmitter coordinates: 40°02′30.4″N 75°14′22.6″W

Links
- Webcast: Listen live (via iHeartRadio)
- Website: wdasfm.iheart.com

WDAS-FM (105.3 MHz) is a commercial radio station, licensed to serve Philadelphia, Pennsylvania. It carries an urban adult contemporary radio format and is owned by iHeartMedia. WDAS-FM is widely regarded as one of the originators of the Urban AC format, mixing R&B hits of the last 40 years with contemporary R&B. The studios and offices are located in Bala Cynwyd.

WDAS-FM has an effective radiated power (ERP) of 16,500 watts as a Class B station. The transmitter is located in the Roxborough section of Philadelphia, off Wigard Avenue near the Schuylkill River. WDAS-FM broadcasts using HD Radio, with a simulcast of WTEL (airing Black Information Network programming) on the station's second digital subchannel.

== History ==
WDAS-FM is considered to be a heritage radio station in Philadelphia, pioneering a format for adults in the African-American community. Widely regarded as an originator of the Urban Adult Contemporary format, WDAS-FM continues to be among the most popular stations in the Delaware Valley.

=== Early years ===
On September 1, 1959, WDAS-FM signed on the air, mostly simulcasting its AM sister station WDAS. The two stations were owned by Max Leon, who had acquired WDAS in 1950. Classical music was featured on Sundays on WDAS-FM, breaking away from the AM station's programming. By mid-1960s, FM stations were encouraged by the Federal Communications Commission (FCC) to air programming separate from their co-owned AM stations. WDAS-FM station moved to a classical music format exclusively.

In April 1968, the format changed to an "underground" free form format. This short-lived period introduced much of the new voices of "progressive rock" radio, including Michael Tearson and Ed Sciaky. Other voices included popular Top 40 disc jockey Hy Lit from WIBG, and later a popular nighttime show by owner Max Leon's son Steve, who called himself "My Father's Son" on the air. Folk music host Gene Shay also did his program from WDAS-FM at this time.

During the late 1960s and early 1970s, radio stations were under increased pressure by the Nixon administration through the FCC to censor music that involved drug content. Steve Leon ignored this directive and continued to play the music that was popular at the time. While playing Arlo Guthrie's "Coming Into Los Angeles", which referenced smuggling marijuana, Leon charged into the station and ripped the turntable arm off the record. Leon then fired his son and the other on-air staff. To fill the void, the AM station's staff were used as replacements.

=== Philadelphia soul and Disco ===
In 1971, the station changed to a progressive soul format. The station playlist included R&B, soul and funk, playing what would become the classics of their genre and launching careers of "Philadelphia Soul" acts such as The O'Jays, The Stylistics, Patti LaBelle and Teddy Pendergrass. WDAS-FM's rising success paralleled the red-hot popularity of the new R&B sound developed at Philadelphia International Records.

By 1975, as the "Philly Sound" laid the musical groundwork for disco, the station began to integrate more dance music into the station's playlist to go along with its rising popularity. By the end of the decade, WDAS-FM introduced its listenership to new sounds of rap with artists such as Sugarhill Gang, Grandmaster Flash and the Furious Five and Kurtis Blow, as well showcasing local talent like Frankie Smith (of "Double Dutch Bus" fame). By 1980, WDAS-FM was the number one music station in Philadelphia.

WDAS-FM's activist voice was as powerful as its musical one. Legendary broadcasters George "Georgie The Man With The Goods" Woods and Edward "Ed" Bradley shaped the political voice of the station. WDAS-FM earned its position as the "voice of the Black community". Its program director and afternoon DJ was a white radio professional, Joe "Butterball" Tamburro. He had a knack for knowing the records that would become successful hits among Philadelphia's young black fans. Tamburro, nicknamed "Butterball" for his rotund size, guided the station through several decades.

=== Competition from WUSL ===
The station was sold in November 1979 to Black-owned Unity Broadcasting Network, and it honed the Urban Contemporary format in 1980. In January 1983, a new competitor signed on when WUSL became “POWER 99fm”. WUSL's popularity forced WDAS-FM to go into a “CHUrban/Crossover” format (which has evolved into the Rhythmic CHR format), playing more dance hits from the Mainstream Top 40 charts while also keeping Rap and R&B. It also further leveraged their community involvement and public affairs programming aimed at both the black and white communities.

As the disco era faded, WDAS-FM focused on Pop, Dance, R&B and Hip-Hop. The station also introduced a new slogan: "105.3 WDAS-FM, We Got The Juice!", inspired by Attitude's song of the same name. But despite these efforts, WUSL would win the CHUrban/Crossover ratings battle.

By 1992, WDAS-FM evolved into a successful Urban AC format after its AM station flipped to Urban Gospel. In 1994, Unity Broadcasting sold both WDAS stations to the Beasley Broadcast Group. In 1995, when the Tom Joyner Morning Show went into nationwide syndication through ABC, WDAS-FM became a founding network affiliate.

=== Ownership changes ===
In May 1996, Beasley sold WDAS-AM-FM to Evergreen, which also owned WUSL, making them sister stations. In 1997, Evergreen and Chancellor merged to form Chancellor Media and later restructured in 1999 as AMFM, Inc. In 2000, Clear Channel Communications (now iHeartMedia) acquired AMFM.

In 2004, the Tom Joyner Morning Show moved to competitor WRNB. WDAS-FM subsequently picked up The Steve Harvey Morning Show as a replacement. The station also carried Michael Baisden in afternoon drive time until it dropped the show in January 2013.

Since 1979, WDAS-FM has sponsored Unity Day, an annual summer gathering on Benjamin Franklin Parkway. This ended with the death of longtime WDAS-FM program director Joe "Butterball" Tamburro; Tamburro died in July 2012 at age 70.

== Short spacing ==
WDAS-FM is short spaced to country music station WIOV-FM in Ephrata, Pennsylvania, near Lancaster. The two stations operate on first adjacent channels (105.3 MHz and 105.1 MHz) and the distance between the two stations' transmitters is only 49 miles as determined by FCC rules. The minimum distance between two Class B stations operating on first adjacent channels according to current FCC rules is 105 miles.

The two stations have been operating with this close spacing for decades, so the arrangement is grandfathered. It is also short spaced to Hip Hop music station Power 105.1 WWPR-FM in New York City and the distance between the two stations' transmitters is only 94 miles as determined by FCC rules.
