= WUSL =

- Philadelphia, Pennsylvania; United States
- Broadcast area: Philadelphia metropolitan area
- Frequency: 98.9 MHz (HD Radio)
- Branding: Power 99 FM

Programming
- Language: English
- Format: Mainstream urban
- Subchannels: HD2: TikTok Radio
- Affiliations: Premiere Networks

Ownership
- Owner: iHeartMedia; (iHM Licenses, LLC)
- Sister stations: WDAS, WDAS-FM, WIOQ, WRFF, WUMR

History
- First air date: 1961 (as WPBS)
- Former call signs: WPBS (1961–1976)
- Call sign meaning: US 1, LIN Broadcasting (former branding and owner)

Technical information
- Licensing authority: FCC
- Facility ID: 20349
- Class: B
- ERP: 27,000 watts
- HAAT: 204 meters (669 ft)
- Transmitter coordinates: 40.0437°N 75.2418°W

Links
- Public license information: Public file; LMS
- Webcast: Listen live (via iHeartRadio)
- Website: power99.iheart.com

WUSL (98.9 FM) is a commercial radio station licensed to Philadelphia, Pennsylvania. It carries a mainstream urban radio format and is owned by iHeartMedia The studios and offices are on Presidential Boulevard in Bala Cynwyd.

WUSL is a Class B station with an effective radiated power (ERP) of 27,000 watts. Its transmitter is off Wigard Avenue near the Schuylkill River in the Roxborough section of Philadelphia. WUSL broadcasts in the HD Radio hybrid format. Its HD2 digital subchannel has contemporary hit radio format, branded as "TikTok Radio".

== History ==
=== Easy listening and Soft AC ===
In 1961, the 98.9 frequency signed on as WPBS. The call sign represented Philadelphia Bulletin Station, under common ownership with the city's largest daily newspaper at the time, The Evening Bulletin. (The call letters pre-date the 1969, founding of PBS, the Public Broadcasting Service.) WPBS was cross-promoted with the newspaper and featured an easy listening format, airing quarter hour sweeps of mostly instrumental cover versions of popular adult songs, as well as Broadway and Hollywood showtunes. At one point, WPBS was called "Velvet Stereo".

In 1976, the newspaper sold the station to LIN Broadcasting, which at the time also owned WFIL. WPBS's call letters were changed to WUSL, which stood for "U.S. 1", a major north-south route running through Philadelphia. (The "L" represented the number 1.) Program Director Jim Nettleton instituted a soft adult contemporary format mixed with a number of standards which had crossed over to the 1960s/1970s pop charts (e.g. Engelbert Humperdinck, Barbra Streisand, Andy Williams, etc.). The studios were located at 440 Domino Lane in the Roxborough section of Philadelphia, where the station's tower is still located.

=== 1981–1982: Country music ===
On July 3, 1981, the station switched to a "3-in-a-row" country music format as Continuous Country, US-99FM. Two months later, co-owned WFIL switched to a more personality and information-leaning country station, while WUSL stuck with a more-music, limited chatter approach.

But country music's listener base in a northern city such as Philadelphia was not very large, and the station struggled in the ratings. As such, WUSL ended the country format shortly after 1 am on October 9, 1982; the final country song was "Get into Reggae Cowboy" by The Bellamy Brothers. The station then went silent for the night before premiering its new format.

=== 1982-Present Urban contemporary ===
LIN Broadcasting decided to target Philadelphia's growing African-American community with a new radio station by challenging the long established leader in R&B and later Rap music WDAS-FM, so WUSL decided to flip from a Country format into a new CHR/UC hybrid format (also known as both "CHUrban" and "Crossover" a forerunner to the Rhythmic Contemporary format) as "KISS 99fm".

WUSL branded as KISS 99fm for a few weeks until January 1983 when they officially introduced as POWER 99fm. Within months, the station had surpassed WDAS-FM in the ratings and because of WUSL's success stations around the country adopted the Power branding (but not always with an UC, CHUrban/Crossover, or CHR format). Later in 1983 WUSL began presenting its annual major concert event known as The POWER 99fm's PowerHouse (not to be confused with the PBS educational series of the same name).

=== Ownership changes ===
EZ Communications, owner of Top 40-formatted WIOQ, purchased WUSL in July 1994. In February 1997, EZ Communications was attempting to merge with American Radio Systems of Boston, and exchanged its Philadelphia stations, WIOQ and WUSL, plus $10 million, for Evergreen's four FM and two AM stations in Charlotte, North Carolina: WPEG, WBAV (AM/FM), WNKS, WRFX and WFNZ.

In 1996, Evergreen acquired WUSL's chief rival in the urban radio format, WDAS-FM, as well as WDAS AM. With former rivals WUSL and WDAS-FM now co-owned, WUSL focused its programming on younger black, Latino and white listeners, while WDAS-FM served an older demographic.

=== Past personalities ===
One of the most well-known programs to air on WUSL was a morning zoo-style show called "The Carter & Sanborn Morning Show" (or "Carter & Sanborn in the Morning"), which was hosted by Brian Carter and Dave Sanborn. The show featured a cast of off-beat characters, all voiced by Sanborn, including wise-cracking horoscope reader "Horace, the Taurus" and fall down drunk blues singer "Lunchmeat Mumford".

During the late 1980s and early 1990s, the show was a main draw in Philadelphia among younger members of all demographics. Bill Simpson, who would later host a nighttime show on both incarnations of WJJZ (first at 106.1 and later at 97.5), used the alias Dave Sanborn on the show, which often created confusion with the well-known jazz saxophonist David Sanborn, especially among those who were not regular listeners. The show was briefly revived in 2005, on WDAS-FM after that station dropped Tom Joyner from its schedule.

From 1991 to 1998, Power 99 aired the groundbreaking hip hop show "Radioactive", hosted by Colby Colb. Also on the show were DJ Ran, DJ Cosmic Kev and Robert "Laid Back" Black. Colby Colb started as an intern at the station and following the success of Radioactive went on to host nights (6–10pm), mornings with Wendy Williams and Dee Lee (The Dream Team). The Dream Team would become one of the biggest urban morning shows in the country competing closely with market leader Howard Stern whose syndicated morning show was on WYSP at the time.

Their success was short lived as Wendy Williams left in August 2001, to go back to New York City to do afternoons on WBLS. Colb left WUSL six months later in March 2002 to help launch sister station WWPR-FM in New York City. From 2002 until 2011, WUSL was the only urban contemporary station in Philadelphia. At that point, Radio One's WPHI-FM switched formats to urban contemporary from rhythmic contemporary under the direction of program director (and former Power 99 host) Colby Colb. WUSL and WPHI competed in the early/mid 2000s in one of the most closely watched radio battles in the U.S.

WUSL was also the home of the controversial Star and Buc Wild Morning Show from late 2005 to May 2006. It was also the home of Miss Jones in the Morning, Shamara – "The Midday Princess" and The Power 99FM's Hot Boyz with Poochman, Mikey Dredd and Uncle O at night.

The 2013 on air line up consisted of "The Rise N Grind Morning Show" with Mina SayWhat (former DJ of Sirius/XM's The Heat), and Mikey Dredd (former member of the Hot Boyz). SayWhat left the station in December 2017.

In October 2025, “The Rise N Grind Morning Show” ended with the layoffs of Mikey Dredd and MuthaKnows as part of national cuts by iHeartMedia. They were replaced by a simulcast of "The Breakfast Club" from sister-station WWPR-FM.

=== Public affairs shows ===
WUSL has won numerous awards for its news and public affairs programming, a hallmark of which was their Sunday morning programming. From its inception as Power 99, Sunday mornings featured two public affairs shows: Sunday Morning Live, hosted by longtime news anchor Loraine Ballard Morrill and later Empower Half Hour with Lehronda Upshur.

== Awards and honors ==
The station was one of 10 awarded the 2007 Crystal Radio Award for public service awarded by the National Association of Broadcasters. Winners were honored at the Radio Luncheon on April 17, 2007, during the NAB Show in Las Vegas, Nevada.

== Former personnel ==
- Don Juan Banks (deceased)
- Tony Brown (later at WDAS-FM, deceased)
- Fred Buggs (later at WQHT-FM in New York City)
- Brian Carter (co-host of Carter & Sanborn In The Morning, deceased)
- Wendy "Lady B" Clark
- Colby Colb (Later VP of Programming for Radio One)
- JoJo Davis (later became a judge in Orlando, Florida)
- Mike Jackson
- B.J. Johnson (later at WDAS-FM, deceased)
- Mina SayWhat
- Miss Jones
- John Monds (later host of a national evening show, "Love and R&B")
- Monie Love (later at WALR in Atlanta)
- Lorraine Ballard Morrill (news/public affairs)
- Gary Shepherd
- Bill Simpson (on-air as Dave Sanborn) (co-host of Carter & Sanborn In The Morning)
- Barbara Sommers (previously at WFIL 560, deceased)
- Stanley T (later at SiriusXM)
- Wendy Williams (now a national TV talk show host)
- Jeff Wyatt (later programmed iHeartMedia stations in Baltimore and Washington DC)

== Signal note ==
WUSL is short-spaced to WAWZ in Zarephath, New Jersey. They operate on first adjacent channels (98.9 and 99.1) and their transmitters are only 53 miles apart. The minimum distance between two Class B stations operating on first adjacent channels according to current FCC rules should be 105 miles.

The two stations have operated with the short-spacing for decades. The arrangement is now grandfathered.
