= Max Leon =

Max M. Leon (1904 – November 2, 1984) was an impresario, radio producer, conductor, musicologist, opera manager, referee, and businessman. He had a wide array of talents and interests which led him towards a highly diversified career in many fields from running and owning WDAS (AM) from 1950 to 1979, refereeing for polo sporting events, and owning and operating Whole-Sum Products, a candy factory, for more than four decades. He also was a highly accomplished musician, serving as the founder and conductor of the Philadelphia Pops Orchestra (a predecessor to Philly Pops) and working as the general manager of the Opera Company of Philadelphia.

== Biography ==
Born in Poland to Jewish parents, Leon came to the United States at the age of 16. He began his career working for the Whole-Sum Products candy factory in Philadelphia in the 1920s during which time he also played a variety of instruments in "Max Leon and his Musical Eagles", a local dance band. Leon eventually became the general manager of Whole-Sum Products and later bought the company in 1934, which he kept going into the 1970s. He created the formula for the marshmallow that was used in Breyers chocolate marshmallow ice cream. The company also had contracts with Acme Markets.

Leon continued to be active with several amateur musical groups in Philadelphia during the 1930s. He eventually ended up studying conducting with Paul Breisach, a conductor at the Metropolitan Opera, Martin Rich at the Curtis Institute of Music, and Eugene Ormandy, famed director of the Philadelphia Orchestra. Leon financed and founded the Philadelphia Pops Orchestra in 1943 and became the principal conductor. The orchestra was made up of musicians primarily from the Philadelphia Orchestra. He conducted concerts with the orchestra for many years. From 1963–1975 he served as president of the board of the Philadelphia Grand Opera Company, also serving as general manager from 1972–1975 after the departure of Anthony Terracciano. He oversaw that company's merger with the Philadelphia Lyric Opera Company to form the Opera Company of Philadelphia (OCP) in 1975. From 1975–1978 he served as OCP's first General Director.

On October 19, 1950, Leon bought WDAS-AM from William Goldman, moving the station from Ocean City, New Jersey to Philadelphia. He then relocated the station from Center City to Fairmount Park, where he built a world class facility with new towers and transmitter. He ran the station, which was marketed towards the black community, for almost three decades. In October 1979 he sold the station to the National Black Network. He was also the owner of KNTO, a radio station located in Wichita Falls, Texas.

Subsequent to his broadcasting career, Mr. Leon owned and trained numerous thoroughbred race horses.

Leon died in Philadelphia in 1984. He was inducted posthumously into the Broadcast Pioneers of Philadelphia Hall of Fame in 2007.
