= WUMR (FM) =

Spanish-language contemporary hit radio station in Philadelphia

- Philadelphia, Pennsylvania; United States
- Broadcast area: Philadelphia metropolitan area
- Frequency: 106.1 MHz (HD Radio)
- Branding: Rumba 106.1

Programming
- Language: Spanish
- Format: Contemporary hit radio
- Subchannels: HD2: Smooth jazz "Philly's Smooth Jazz"
- Affiliations: iHeartRadio; Premiere Networks

Ownership
- Owner: iHeartMedia; (iHM Licenses, LLC)
- Sister stations: WDAS; WDAS-FM; WIOQ; WRFF; WUSL

History
- First air date: November 11, 1959
- Former call signs: WQAL (1959–1970); WWSH (1970–1984); WZGO (1984–1986); WTRK (1986–1987); WEGX (1987–1993); WJJZ (1993–2006); WISX (2006–2022)
- Call sign meaning: scrambling of "Rumba"

Technical information
- Licensing authority: FCC
- Facility ID: 53973
- Class: B
- ERP: 22,500 watts
- HAAT: 226.0 meters (741.5 ft)
- Transmitter coordinates: 40°04′58.3″N 75°10′52.6″W

Links
- Public license information: Public file; LMS
- Webcast: Listen live (via iHeartRadio); HD2: Listen live (via iHeartRadio)
- Website: rumba1061.iheart.com

WUMR (106.1 FM, Rumba 106.1) is a commercial Spanish contemporary hit radio station that is licensed to serve Philadelphia, Pennsylvania, and is owned by iHeartMedia. The WUMR studios are located in the neighboring community of Bala Cynwyd, while the station transmitter resides in nearby Wyndmoor.

In addition to a standard analog transmission, WUMR broadcasts using two HD Radio channels, and is available online via iHeartRadio.

== History ==
=== 1959-1982: Easy listening ===
The station commenced operations at 5 pm on November 11, 1959, with the WQAL call sign, owned by George Voron, whose company provided businesses with "piped-in music". After playing "The Star-Spangled Banner" as performed by Henry Mancini and a message from Dave Custis—in charge of the station's format—the first song was "The Carousel Waltz" by Percy Faith. The station employed a beautiful music format playing mostly instrumental versions of popular songs with an occasional vocalist.

Transamerica Corporation's United Artists subsidiary purchased WQAL in 1970; the call sign was changed to WWSH, and rebranded as "Wish 106." The WQAL call sign would be reused by the former WCJW (104.1 FM) in Cleveland, Ohio less than one year later. The station was sold again in 1977, to Cox Enterprises. Initially, the sound remained easy listening, with more contemporary vocalists added to the playlist by 1980.

=== 1983-1993: Top 40 ===
WWSH's format was changed in 1982, to hot adult contemporary branded as "FM 106", soon modified one year later to contemporary hit radio (CHR); the call sign was changed to WZGO and changed monikers to "Z-106" on July 16, 1984. On May 23, 1986, the station's call sign was changed to WTRK and rebranded again as "Electric 106", consulted by Mike Joseph, who had created the "Hot Hits" version of CHR for WCAU-FM (98.1) five years earlier. Like WCAU-FM in its early months of hot hits, WTRK featured a very tight playlist of only current hit songs and intense disc jockeys; unlike WCAU-FM, however, ratings and revenue for "Electric 106" did not improve. Cox sold the station to Malrite Communications in April 1987.

On March 13, 1987, at 6 p.m., the station's call sign was changed to WEGX, and rebranded as "Eagle 106". The first song played on "Eagle 106" was "Living in America" by James Brown. The station kept the CHR/top 40 format, but gave it a more adult-friendly makeover, designing the station to appeal primarily to women aged 18–34. Research had shown that listeners in their 20s and older scoffed at the more teen-oriented WCAU-FM as the "bubblegum music" radio station, and WCAU-FM had trouble making a profit because of that perception. "Eagle 106" attempted to combat the teen-oriented image that came with the CHR format by conducting extensive music research with women in its target demographic, eliminating most jingles, and "dayparting" - playing more gold titles during the day to attract adult listeners at work while continuing to program for teenagers at night with higher energy and more new music.

The move paid off, as WEGX's ratings rose steadily through 1987, while WCAU-FM's fell. In November 1987, WCAU-FM dropped the Top 40 format in favor of oldies as WOGL, leaving WEGX as the only Top 40 station in the market. With the CHR format all to itself, WEGX's ratings climbed even higher, and by the spring of 1988, the station had moved into the top five in Philadelphia Arbitron ratings (1). Former "Partridge Family" cast member Danny Bonaduce made his debut as a radio disc jockey as the station's night man around this time. During the early 1990s, WEGX's ratings would decline slightly; in the Summer 1991 book, the station would hold a 3.7 share of the market (12+), though it would remain in the top 5 in key target demographics.

=== 1993-2006: Smooth jazz ===
Malrite Communications divested most of their radio holdings to Roy E. Disney's Shamrock Broadcasting in 1992; WJJZ was retained and spun off to a "new" Malrite, headed by many of the same company executives. Following that transaction, on March 12, 1993, at 1:06 p.m., after playing "I Will Remember You" by Amy Grant, WEGX switched to smooth jazz as WJJZ. The first song played after the switch was "New Day for You" by Basia. Bernie Kimble, program director at WNWV in Cleveland, joined WJJZ in the same capacity; he would depart the station in 1995, to rejoin WNWV.

Malrite sold the station to Pyramid in 1994, and then to Evergreen Media in January 1996; around this time, most of the new age and contemporary jazz was phased out in favor of additional adult contemporary and R&B crossovers. WJJZ also introduced the Vacation-A-Day giveaway, giving away free vacations to different locales, describing it as the biggest giveaway in Philadelphia radio history. This promotion lasted until the end of 2005; other smooth jazz stations across the country also launched similar promotions.

In 1997, Evergreen Media was purchased by Chancellor Media, which eventually was purchased by AMFM, Inc. in 1999, and, in turn, merged into Clear Channel Communications in 2000. During the late 1990s, WJJZ saw its finest ratings, reaching into the top five of the Arbitrons for Philadelphia. However, WJJZ lost afternoon host Deanna Wright and longtime evening host Desirae McCrae in 2002 due to corporate-wide layoffs; this would be followed by Teri Webb's dismissal by the end of 2005. The music on the air began to feature fewer instrumentals and more vocals, while still being called smooth jazz.

Mix 106.1 logo, 2010-2017

=== 2006-2010: Rhythmic AC ===
Although ratings were rebounding, rumors began to swirl in July 2006, that a format change was imminent, as Clear Channel wanted to give a Philadelphia clearance for its syndicated morning show Wake Up with Whoopi with Whoopi Goldberg. On August 8, the airstaff was dismissed; two days later at noon, WJJZ's midday host and program director Michael Tozzi bid farewell to 13 years of smooth jazz with a sign-off message and messages from several smooth jazz artists. After playing "She's Gone" by Hall & Oates, WJJZ flipped to rhythmic adult contemporary, branded as "Philly's 106.1". The first song played was "Let's Get It Started" by The Black Eyed Peas. For the first month, the station was completely automated and the staff was voice-tracked.

Although the station kept its WJJZ call sign for a month after the flip, it eventually changed its call sign to WISX. Not too long after, WISX changed its branding to "My 106.1". In November 2006, WJJZ returned to the FM dial when Greater Media placed it on 97.5, with most of the same personalities also returning; this incarnation lasted until September 2008.

WISX was gaining ground in the AC market in Philadelphia, and at one point ranked #1 during the work day in Women 25-54 (Arbitron). The audience largely consisted of hard-to-reach working women. Although its musical direction had a ventured toward hot AC for a time, WISX started to concentrate once again on the rhythmic AC fare.

=== 2010-2017: Hot AC ===
The station returned to hot AC by late 2010, as Clear Channel began withdrawing rhythmic AC stations in various markets. WISX rebranded as "Mix 106.1" on November 15, remaining a hot AC station. The "Mix" branding had been on WMWX (now WBEN-FM) prior to 2005.

=== 2017-2018: Back to Rhythmic AC ===
Logo as "Real" (2017–2018)

On June 29, 2017, at 10 a.m., after playing "Good Riddance (Time of Your Life)" by Green Day, morning host Chio Acosta began a stunt where in he played music from various genres that listeners requested via phone or text messaging; the first song under the stunt was "Enter Sandman" by Metallica. At the same time, all references to "Mix" were completely wiped from the station, leading to rumors of a format change. At noon, after playing "Dance the Night Away" by Van Halen, WISX switched back to rhythmic adult contemporary as "Real 106-1", launching with "Summertime" by Philadelphia-based DJ Jazzy Jeff & The Fresh Prince. While "Real" had a classic hip-hop lean (to fill the void after WPHI-FM swapped frequencies with WPPZ and shifted to urban in September 2016), the station included some currents. In addition, Chio continued as morning host, while Ryan Seacrest and Mario Lopez's syndicated shows were dropped.

=== 2018-2022: Soft AC ===
Logo as "The Breeze" (2018–2022)

On November 9, 2018, at noon, after playing "End of the Road" by Philadelphia group Boyz II Men, WISX began stunting with Christmas music, using the slogan "Philly's REAL Christmas Favorites"; this followed industry trade website RadioInsight reporting days earlier that iHeartMedia purchased multiple "Breeze" related domains for the station. Various liners on WISX implied a new format would be coming after the holidays, as well as directing "Real" listeners to sister stations WUSL and WDAS-FM. Morning host Chio then posted on Twitter that the entire airstaff had been let go. The stunt ended at noon on November 12, with WISX flipping to soft adult contemporary, branded as "106.1 The Breeze"; the first song on "The Breeze" was "Me and Mrs. Jones" by Billy Paul, a native of North Philadelphia. The change returned the format to Philadelphia for the first time since WSNI dropped it in 2006, and also positioned the station against WBEB, which had been acquired by Entercom the month prior. WISX served as the Philadelphia affiliate for Delilah.

=== 2022-present: Spanish CHR ===
On March 8, 2022, at midnight, after playing "Scenes from an Italian Restaurant" by Billy Joel, WISX dropped its soft AC format and began stunting with a temporary simulcast of Top 40/CHR-formatted sister station WIOQ. On the same day, morning host Valerie Knight announced that she was let go from the station after three years. On March 10, at noon, after playing "I Like Me Better" by Lauv, WISX shifted their stunting to all-Bad Bunny songs, while promoting a change to come the following day at noon; by this time, the liners would shift to being delivered in Spanish rather than English. At the promised time, WISX flipped to Spanish-language contemporary hits as "Rumba 106.1", with "Mi Niña" by Wisin, Myke Towers and Los Legendarios being the first song played. The flip brought the "Rumba" branding back to Philadelphia for the first time since 2011, when WDAS flipped to urban oldies, and back to FM since 2007, when WUBA (coincidentally, a former Soft AC station itself as WSNI before that frequency's flip to 'Rumba' in 2006) flipped to alternative. On March 21, WISX changed its call sign to WUMR to match the new format.
