= WIOQ =

Contemporary hit radio station in Philadelphia

- Philadelphia, Pennsylvania; United States
- Broadcast area: Greater Philadelphia
- Frequency: 102.1 MHz (HD Radio)
- Branding: Q102

Programming
- Language: English
- Format: Contemporary hit radio
- Subchannels: HD2: Radio USA; HD3: Pride Radio; (dance hits for the LGBTQ+ community)
- Affiliations: Premiere Networks

Ownership
- Owner: iHeartMedia; (iHM Licenses, LLC)
- Sister stations: WDAS; WDAS-FM; WRFF; WUMR; WUSL

History
- First air date: November 10, 1941
- Former call signs: W53PH (1941–1943); WFIL-FM (1943–1971)
- Former frequencies: 45.3 MHz (1941–1948); 99.9 MHz (1945–1948)
- Call sign meaning: "IOQ" looks like "102"; "Q" resembles "2" in cursive writing

Technical information
- Licensing authority: FCC
- Facility ID: 20348
- Class: B
- ERP: 27,000 watts
- HAAT: 204 meters (669 ft)
- Transmitter coordinates: 40°02′37.4″N 75°14′30.6″W

Links
- Public license information: Public file; LMS
- Webcast: Listen live (via iHeartRadio)
- Website: q102.iheart.com; HD2: rusa.fm; HD3: phillyprideradio.iheart.com

WIOQ (102.1 FM) is a commercial radio station licensed to serve Philadelphia, Pennsylvania, owned by iHeartMedia. The station broadcasts a contemporary hit radio format, and carries a mixture of local programming and nationally syndicated shows, including Elvis Duran and the Morning Show. Its studios and offices are on Presidential Boulevard in Bala Cynwyd.

WIOQ has an effective radiated power (ERP) of 27,000 watts, its transmitter site is located off Wigard Avenue in the Roxborough section of Philadelphia. WIOQ broadcasts using the HD Radio hybrid format, with the HD2 digital subchannel previously airing Russian language "Radio USA" and the HD3 subchannel carrying iHeart's LGBTQ national format "Pride Radio" with some local programming as well. The HD2 subchannel has since been turned off.

== History ==
=== 1940–1968: early years ===
In May 1940, the Federal Communications Commission (FCC) authorized an FM band effective January 1, 1941, operating on 40 channels spanning 42–50 MHz. The FCC granted the WFIL Broadcasting Company a construction permit for a new FM station at 45.3 MHz on February 4, 1941, which was assigned the call sign W53PH. W53PH made its debut broadcast on November 11, 1941, and was formally licensed by the FCC on September 9, 1942.

At the time of its start, it was announced that the station's daily 2 P.M. to 8 P.M. schedule would rarely simulcast its AM sister station 560 WFIL, and "approximately 82 percent of the station's time on the air is being devoted to fine music".

Effective November 1, 1943, the FCC modified its policy for FM call signs, and the station call letters were changed to WFIL-FM. After the FCC created the current FM band on June 27, 1945, the FCC granted temporary authority for operation on 99.9 MHz beginning on December 29, 1945.

The station's license was assigned to Triangle Publications, effective March 1, 1946. At the time, WFIL (560 AM) was owned by Triangle Publications, which published The Philadelphia Inquirer daily newspapers and TV Guide magazine. WFIL-FM mostly simulcast the AM station in its early years.

The FCC issued a new construction permit on June 10, 1946, for permanent operation on 99.9 MHz. However, on June 27, 1947, the FCC reallocated the station to 102.1 MHz and authorized temporary operation on the new frequency. On February 5, 1948, the FCC granted Triangle Publications permission for the station to cease broadcasting on 45.3 MHz. A new construction permit was issued by the FCC for permanent operation on 102.1 MHz on September 29, 1948, followed by a new license on January 4, 1950. By the 1960s, WFIL-FM had been airing separate classical music shows, breaking away from the AM simulcast.

=== 1968–1971: soft AC ===
On July 10, 1968, WFIL-FM switched away from classical music to an early version of a soft adult contemporary format. Known as "Popular 102", the station featured softer pop music of the day with a mix of currents, oldies and instrumentals. Each hour included a track from a featured album of the week, and voices on the station were pre-recorded announcements and news from the staff at sister station WFIL, including Jay Cook, J.J. Jeffrey, Tommy Tyler and news from Allen Stone and Glenn Barton.

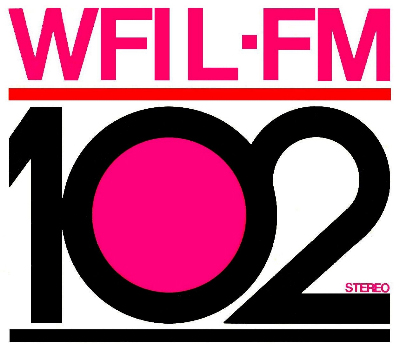
WFIL-FM's early logo

The station promoted itself as playing "The Nicest Music for the Nicest People." This format continued through May 1971, when Triangle Publications decided to sell its Philadelphia broadcasting stations.

=== 1971–1975: easy listening ===
In 1971, Triangle Publications sold WFIL-AM-FM-TV to Capital Cities Broadcasting (later Capital Cities Communications). In turn, WFIL-AM was sold to LIN Broadcasting and WFIL-FM was spun off to Richer Communications in May 1971. The FM call letters were changed to WIOQ representing the script version of the frequency "102". The familiar jingle of Popular 102 was also changed to "W102". Initially, the familiar PAMS jingles were updated to reflect the new call letters and the station continued as before. By 1972, the station's imaging changed to Stereo Island, which trended even softer than the station had been, but added live DJs while the music rotated on an IGM automation unit.

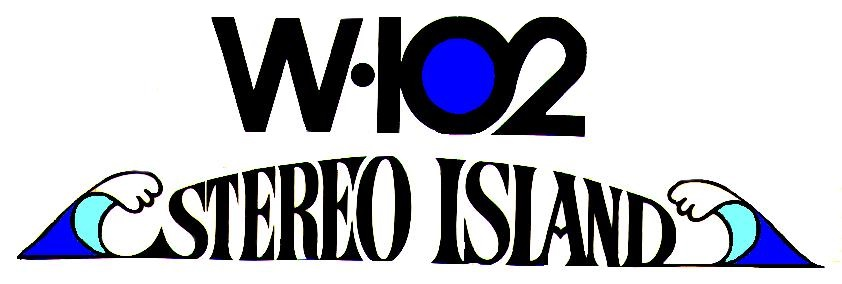
W-102 Stereo Island Logo

Air staff at this time included Jeff Dean, Lee Meredith, Art Andrews, Alan Drew (Frio), Jere Sullivan, and Jay Mathieu, with Dave Klahr continuing as program director. After a year or so in this format, the station brought back the Popular 102 moniker and started playing a slightly more uptempo mix of pop tunes. When Dave Klahr left, Roy Laurence was hired as program director and the station's mix became Top 40-based with a more adult presentation than former sister station 560 WFIL.

=== 1975–1977: progressive rock ===
Gradually the music became more rock-oriented, and by about 1975 WIOQ had a progressive rock format. Around this time the station began using an extract from the album Intergalactic Trot by Stardrive as the music bed for hourly station IDs. It would remain WIOQ's audio signature for over a decade.

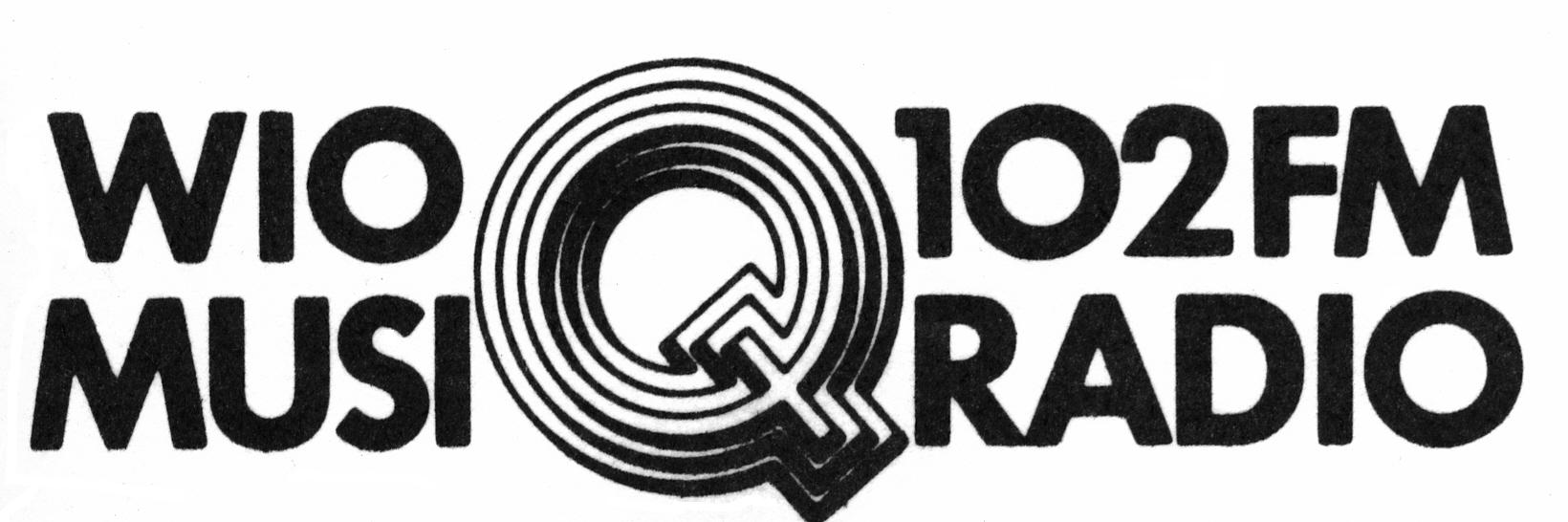
Early Q102 logo with the "Musicradio" slogan

The station also started using the moniker "Q102" during that time. For a time in the mid-'70s, the station affiliated with ABC's "American FM Radio Network" to air some programs hosted by then-hip Geraldo Rivera. That contract also required the station to air the network's ABC news at :15 past the hour, as its competition was playing music. The station had trouble competing with established FM rock leader 93.3 WMMR and aggressive AOR upstart 94.1 WYSP. Programming duties were split between Alex DeMers and Bill Fantini, with DJs Jim Harlan, John Harvey, and Bill Paul rounding out the full-time air staff. After a few years, the owner (by then listed as Que Broadcasting, Inc.) declared bankruptcy. WIOQ emerged from the bankruptcy under the ownership of The Outlet Company, a retail and broadcasting firm based in Providence, Rhode Island.

=== 1977–1987: adult rock ===
Under Outlet, WIOQ evolved into an eclectic music format described as "adult rock". The station played a blend of softer songs heard on rock music stations, some deeper album cuts, a few top 40 crossover hits, and a bit of uptempo jazz. Leading air personalities on WIOQ in this era included John Harvey ("Harvey in the Morning"), Helen Leicht who hosted a show called "Breakfast With The Beatles" on Sunday mornings, David Dye, Ed Sciaky and Michael Tozzi. (Leicht and Dye later joined the adult alternative public station WXPN. The former hosted "Leicht Lunch" program at noon, and Dye became the producer and host of the nationally distributed World Cafe.)

After a proposed sale of Outlet's broadcast properties to Coca-Cola's Columbia Pictures subsidiary around 1982 fell through, the station group was acquired by Wesray Capital Corporation, a corporation partially owned by former Treasury Secretary William E. Simon.

=== 1987–1988: oldies ===
After years of low to moderate ratings, on November 10, 1987, at 6 am, the adult rock format was dropped in favor of an oldies format as "Solid Gold 102". WIOQ's playlist focused on the hits of 1955–1973.

While WIOQ was changing its format, CBS-owned WCAU-FM switched from a top 40 format to also play oldies as WOGL. Within a matter of days, Philadelphia went from having no oldies FM station to having two. CBS had been putting the oldies format on a number of its FM stations around the U.S., based on the success of WCBS-FM in New York City. WIOQ had trouble competing for the same oldies audience as WOGL.

=== 1988–present: top 40 ===
In 1988, WIOQ was sold to EZ Communications. On January 18, 1989, at 7:18 a.m., the station dropped oldies and switched to a rhythmic contemporary format, branded as "Q102".

The station initially leaned toward dance and urban material, but played some rock and pop crossover songs, changing according to chart trends and competitive conditions. In 1994, urban rival WUSL was bought by EZ, forming a sales and demographic combo where WUSL targeted African-American listeners, while WIOQ targeted more of a Caucasian and Latino audience. In 1996, EZ merged with American Radio Systems. To satisfy ownership limits (as well as taking advantage of a larger advertising market), WIOQ and WUSL were traded to Evergreen Media (owner of WJJZ), with EZ receiving Evergreen's Charlotte stations in return. In February 1997, Evergreen and Chancellor Media merged. After the Chancellor acquisition, WIOQ became co-owned with WYXR (now WRFF), WDAS, WDAS-FM, WUSL, and WJJZ (now WUMR). On November 20, 1998, the station evolved to Mainstream CHR.

As a result of a large merger in 2000, WIOQ and the other stations in its cluster became properties of Clear Channel Communications. Clear Channel later changed its name to iHeartMedia.

On March 8, 2022, at midnight, WIOQ began a temporary simulcast on sister station WISX as a stunt for the latter frequency. The simulcast lasted until March 10, when WISX shifted its stunting to all-Bad Bunny songs leading into a format change to Spanish CHR the following day.
