= WDAS (AM) =

Sports radio station in Philadelphia

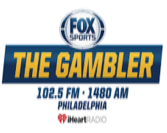
- Philadelphia, Pennsylvania; United States
- Broadcast area: Philadelphia metropolitan area
- Frequency: 1480 kHz
- Branding: Fox Sports The Gambler

Programming
- Language: English
- Format: Sports radio
- Network: Fox Sports Radio
- Affiliations: iHeartRadio; Philadelphia Union; Villanova Wildcats

Ownership
- Owner: iHeartMedia; (iHM Licenses, LLC)
- Sister stations: WDAS-FM; WIOQ; WRFF; WUMR; WUSL

History
- First air date: July 1922
- Former call signs: WIAD (1922–1929); WELK (1929–1934); WDAS (1934–2007); WUBA (2007–2011)
- Former frequencies: 833 kHz (1922–1923); 1180 kHz (1923–1925); 1200 kHz (1925–1927); 1280 kHz (1927); 1360 kHz (1927); 1040 kHz (1927–1928); 1370 kHz (1928–1941); 1400 kHz (1941–1956)
- Call sign meaning: Dannenbaum & Steppacher, former owners (1934–1950)

Technical information
- Licensing authority: FCC
- Facility ID: 71315
- Class: B
- Power: 5,000 watts (day); 1,000 watts (night)
- Translator: See § Translators
- Repeater: 104.5 WRFF-HD2 (Philadelphia)

Links
- Public license information: Public file; LMS
- Webcast: Listen live (via iHeartRadio)
- Website: foxphlgambler.iheart.com

WDAS (1480 kHz) is an AM radio station in Philadelphia, Pennsylvania. Owned and operated by iHeartMedia, the station airs a sports radio format as an affiliate of Fox Sports Radio. WDAS's studios and offices are located in Bala Cynwyd.

WDAS's transmitter is located near Fairmount Park, off West Ford Road. By day, the station’s power is 5,000 watts; to avoid interfering with other stations on 1480 AM, it reduces power to 1,000 watts at night and uses a directional antenna at all times. WDAS programming is also heard on an FM translator station, 102.5 W273DO in Philadelphia.

== History ==
=== Early years ===
The station was first licensed to the Ocean City Yacht Club as WIAD in Ocean City, New Jersey, and signed on the air in July 1922. The station was originally assigned to the "entertainment wavelength" of 360 meters (833 kHz), and call letters were randomly issued from a sequential roster of available call signs. In 1923, ownership was transferred to Howard R. Miller, who moved the station to Philadelphia.

Following the establishment of the Federal Radio Commission (FRC), stations were initially issued a series of temporary authorizations starting on May 3, 1927. In addition, they were informed that if they wanted to continue operating, they needed to file a formal license application by January 15, 1928, as the first step in determining whether they met the new "public interest, convenience, or necessity" standard. On May 25, 1928, the FRC issued General Order 32, which notified 164 stations, including WIAD, that "From an examination of your application for future license it does not find that public interest, convenience, or necessity would be served by granting it." However, the station successfully convinced the commission that it should remain licensed.

On November 11, 1928, the FRC made a major reallocation of station transmitting frequencies, as part of a reorganization resulting from its implementation of General Order 40. WIAD was assigned to 1370 kHz.

In 1929, the station's studio and transmitter were moved to the Elks Club at Broad and Vine Streets and the call sign changed to WELK.

In 1934, Miller sold the station, and the new owners, silk manufacturers Dannenbaum & Steppacher, adopted the WDAS call sign, with the letters spelling out the company's initials. A.W. Dannenbaum served as the station president. The studios were located at 1211 Chestnut Street.

WDAS broadcast ethnic programming in languages such as Italian, Yiddish and Polish. In 1941, WDAS moved to 1400 AM, then about 15 years later to its current frequency of 1480 AM.

In 1950, candy manufacturer Max Leon purchased the station for $495,000 from William Goldman, a theater chain owner. The programming at the time consisted of big band music, ethnic and cultural shows. Leon, the founder and conductor of the original Philly Pops Orchestra, added an all-night classical music show.

=== Switch to R&B ===
In 1951, Leon promoted his son-in-law, Bob Klein, to general manager. Klein saw an opportunity in the marketplace and adopted programming geared toward the local African-American community. The music consisted of rhythm & blues and jazz. WDAS added a number of young personalities, including Georgie Woods, Jimmy Bishop, Carl Helm, Butterball Tamburro, Jocko Henderson and Hy Lit. The station also added black-oriented public affairs and news programs, and provided coverage of the unfolding civil rights movement, with journalists Joe Rainey and Jim Klash, along with Walt Sanders, Carl Stubbs, Bill Adams, Dave Colman, Jimmy Carter and reporter Ed Bradley (later of CBS's 60 Minutes).

The station employed many black professionals, in on-air, office and management positions. The station also took on an activist role. WDAS was commended by many in the industry and in the civil rights movement. In 1959, Leon and Klein signed on an FM sister station, WDAS-FM. By the early 1970s, the FM station would launch a groundbreaking and influential urban adult contemporary format still heard today.

WDAS (AM) retained its R&B format throughout the 1960s and 70s, while adding gospel music with Louise Williams on Sunday mornings. Many people involved in the civil rights movement, including Martin Luther King Jr. and Malcolm X, visited and were heard on the station. Following his return from Mecca, Malcolm X visited the station on December 29, 1964. He was interviewed by Rainey under heavy armed police guard due to assassination threats.

Klein filed a class action lawsuit against the Arbitron rating service in 1972, on behalf of all black radio stations, protesting that black radio listenership was undercounted. Arbitron settled the suit after four days of testimony and amended its methodologies and policies to make a better effort to survey African-American listeners and other minorities.

=== Ownership changes ===
Leon sold the station in November 1979, to the minority-owned Unity Broadcasting Network. In the 1980s, WDAS added the National Black Network (NBN) for hourly newscasts, and tried a news format in the mornings, anchored locally by Karen Warrington, E. Steven Collins and Wynne Alexander) and afternoons via the NBN feed. With music listening shifting to FM, WDAS wanted to compete with all-news radio KYW. This was unsuccessful, and the station returned with a mix of gospel, R&B and talk shows. In 1988, as more listeners were choosing FM urban contemporary stations, WDAS switched to a full-time gospel music and religious format.

Beasley Broadcasting purchased WDAS and WDAS-FM in 1994. Two years later, the stations were sold to Evergreen Media, which soon merged with Chancellor Broadcasting, which later became AMFM Inc. In August 2000, after a series of mergers, the two stations would become properties of Clear Channel Communications. Clear Channel changed its name to iHeartMedia after its successful iHeartRadio internet platform in 2014.

=== Format changes ===
On May 16, 2007, WDAS flipped to tropical music as Rumba 1480, a format and branding displaced by WRFF's flip to modern rock as Radio 104.5. The station's former WUBA calls were also adopted by WDAS. WUBA served as the Spanish language flagship radio station of the Philadelphia Phillies.

On November 22, 2011, the station began redirecting existing listeners to WHAT, after Clear Channel announced that the Rumba format would be replaced by a new urban oldies format the next day as WDAS, The Soul of Philadelphia. The station soft launched with R&B Christmas music for the holiday season, before officially launching its new format on December 27.

=== Smooth Jazz JJZ ===
Logo as Smooth Jazz JJZ.

On June 10, 2013, at 12 pm, the station flipped to smooth jazz as Smooth Jazz JJZ, reviving a heritage branding that had historically been used by the current WISX from 1993 to 2006, and from November 17, 2006 to September 5, 2008, by the current WPEN-FM. Despite the use of the JJZ brand, the station retained the WDAS calls.

From September 19–27, 2015, WDAS temporarily became Pope Info Radio, a "pop-up station" covering Pope Francis's first visit to the United States and its conclusion in Philadelphia. The station interspersed its regular music programming with live coverage of five masses and speeches throughout the visit, and rolling news, traffic, and weather updates relevant to the events.

=== Breakthrough Radio ===
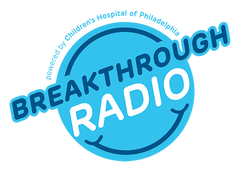
Logo as Breakthrough Radio.

On September 11, 2017, at 12 pm, the station rebranded as Breakthrough Radio. The format was a partnership between iHeartMedia and the Children's Hospital of Philadelphia (CHoP), featuring a format of uptempo pop hits interspersed with health-related features and public service announcements produced by the hospital. The JJZ format moved to WISX-HD2.

=== Fox Sports The Gambler ===
On August 23, 2019, it was announced that WDAS would flip to a sports talk format as part of the Fox Sports Radio network as Fox Sports The Gambler. After stunting with a loop of the NFL on Fox theme music over the following weekend, the new format launched on August 26. Translator W281BI in Trenton was not included in the flip because of its proximity to existing Fox Sports affiliate WNJE.

The station carries local programs geared towards sports betting (taking advantage of the repeal of the Professional and Amateur Sports Protection Act of 1992, which had effectively banned sports betting outside of Nevada); it launched with The Daily Tickets—an afternoon drive program hosted by former WPEN personality Sean Brace. He described The Gambler as the "future" of sports radio, arguing that the betting-oriented positioning of the station would help distinguish itself from WPEN and the market-leading WIP-FM, and promised that the station would feature "no callers" and "just guests that will bring the best information on the games we love to watch". WDAS otherwise carries the full Fox Sports Radio national lineup, including its own betting-related show Straight Outta Vegas.

More local programs were added to its schedule later on; in October 2019, the station added a new evening program hosted by Eytan Shander, What Are The Odds?—which airs on Monday, Tuesday, and Wednesday evenings. In June 2020, the station added a weekly esports program, Cheesesteaks and Controllers, hosted by Jason Fanelli. In July 2020, WDAS became the flagship radio station of the Philadelphia Union of Major League Soccer. The following year, WDAS added rights to Villanova Wildcats football and men's basketball.

== HD Radio ==
WDAS formerly broadcast in HD IBOC format. The HD transmission was turned off when WDAS flipped to urban oldies at the end of 2011. As the launch of "The Gambler", the station initially simulcast on WDAS-FM 105.3-HD2. On August 31, 2020, the simulcast shifted to WRFF-HD2.

== Translators ==
WDAS (AM) programming is broadcast on the following translators:

Call sign	Frequency	City of license	FID	ERP (W)	HAAT	Class	Transmitter coordinates	FCC info
W273DO	102.5 FM	Philadelphia, Pennsylvania	138663	99	114 m (374 ft)	D	39°56′58.60″N 75°10′14.40″W	LMS
