= WPEN =

WPEN may refer to:

- WPEN (FM), a radio station (97.5 FM) licensed to Burlington, New Jersey
- WKDN (AM), a radio station (950 AM) licensed to Philadelphia, Pennsylvania (formerly WPEN, 1929–2012)
- WMGK, a radio station (102.9 FM) licensed to Philadelphia, Pennsylvania (formerly WPEN-FM, 1947–1975)
- WCAU, a television station (channel 10) licensed to Philadelphia, Pennsylvania (formerly WPEN-TV, 1946–1947)
- WOGL, a radio station (98.1 FM) licensed to Philadelphia, Pennsylvania (formerly WPEN-FM, 1943–1947)
- WPEN-LP, a defunct television station in Hampton, Virginia
