= WKDN =

WKDN may refer to:

- WKDN (AM), a radio station (950 AM) licensed to Philadelphia, Pennsylvania, United States
- WCOB (FM), a radio station (88.3 FM) licensed to State College, Pennsylvania, United States, which used the call signs WKDN and WKDN-FM from 2012 to 2021
- WKVP, a radio station (106.9 FM) licensed to Camden, New Jersey, United States, which used the call signs WKDN-FM and WKDN from 1959 to 2012
- WTMR, a radio station (800 AM) licensed to Camden, New Jersey, United States, which used the call sign WKDN from 1948 to 1968
