= WWJZ =

Relevant Radio station in Mount Holly, New Jersey

- Relevant Radio logo

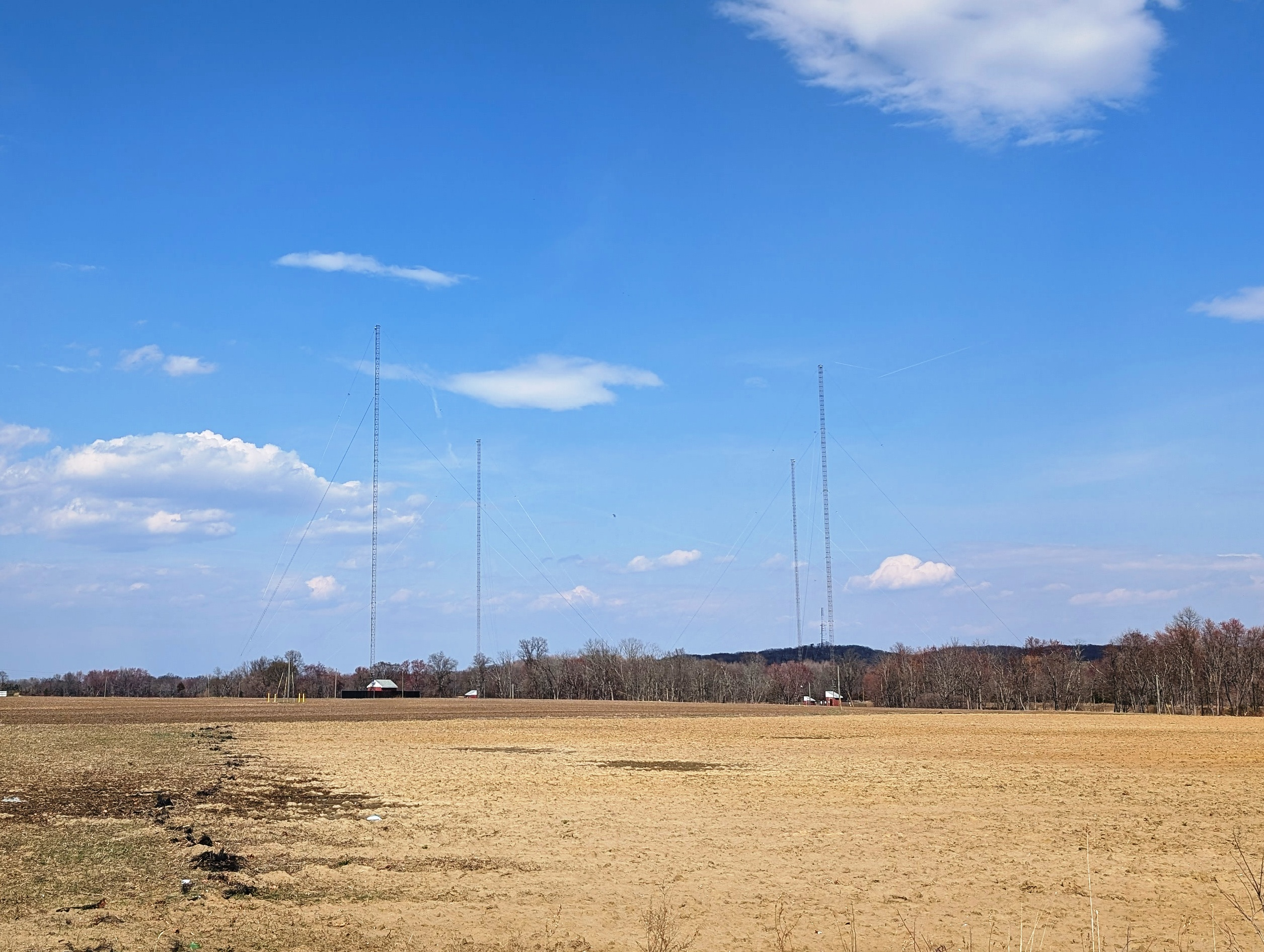
- WWJZ's transmitter towers in Pemberton Township
- Mount Holly, New Jersey; United States
- Broadcast area: Philadelphia metropolitan area; South Jersey
- Frequency: 640 kHz
- Branding: Relevant Radio

Programming
- Language: English
- Format: Catholic radio
- Network: Relevant Radio

Ownership
- Owner: Relevant Radio, Inc.

History
- First air date: November 1992
- Call sign meaning: WJZ (the original call sign of WABC in New York City)

Technical information
- Licensing authority: FCC
- Facility ID: 43904
- Class: B
- Power: 50,000 watts (day); 950 watts (night)
- Transmitter coordinates: 39°59′49.4″N 74°43′9.6″W

Links
- Public license information: Public file; LMS
- Webcast: Listen live
- Website: relevantradio.com

WWJZ (640 AM) is a radio station licensed to Mount Holly, New Jersey, serving Philadelphia and the Philadelphia metropolitan area. The station airs catholic–talk radio programming and is owned and operated by Relevant Radio.

The station's transmitter is located near the intersection of U.S. Route 206 and County Route 630 in Pemberton Township, New Jersey, and station offices are in Fort Washington, Pennsylvania. WWJZ operates with 50,000 watts in the daytime, the maximum permitted for AM stations by the Federal Communications Commission. Because 640 kHz is a clear-channel frequency, WWJZ must reduce power to 950 watts at night to avoid interfering with other radio stations such as KFI in Los Angeles and CBN in St. John's, Newfoundland and Labrador, Canada, the dominant Class A radio stations on 640 AM in North America.

== History ==
WWJZ was owned by John Farina, the originator of the sound adopted by Al Ham's Music of Your Life adult standards format. Farina's dream was to re-establish the signal he had on 1460 kHz in Mount Holly in the 1960s, as WJJZ. With the help of his long-time friend and engineer, Ted Schober, he got New Jersey its first 50,000 watt AM radio station in many years and was able to put his beloved sound on the air again.

Until the inception of WWJZ operation in November 1992, there were no broadcast stations on 640 kHz on the East Coast. This was because KFI in Los Angeles is the clear-channel station on 640, in the days when Class I-A stations had few lesser stations on their frequencies, even thousands of miles away. When the Federal Communications Commission relaxed those regulations, it allowed several new stations, including WWJZ, to go on the air on the 640 frequency.

The music of Brook Benton, Tommy Dorsey, Margaret Whiting, Doris Day, Frankie Laine and many others aired from October 1992 into 1993, emanating from an ancient General Electric transmitter of the type used by the venerable WJZ in its early days as the flagship of the NBC Blue Network. Then a dispute between Farina and WWJZ's landlord, Edgar Cramer, put WWJZ off the air on July 9, 1993.

Not to be defeated, Farina re-established the station on a 1,700–watt temporary transmitter in Florence, New Jersey, with the help of Nick Grand and Schober. The sound was well received, but the weaker signal did not compare to the big transmitter. Shortly thereafter, Farina had a stroke and died. Nick Grand continued the temporary operation as executor through the end of 1999, unable to make peace with Cramer until The Walt Disney Company made an offer to buy the station, to air its Radio Disney format in the Philadelphia media market. After playing "Wish Me Luck as You Wave Me Goodbye" by Gracie Fields from the movie Shipyard Sally, WWJZ began airing the Radio Disney format on September 12. The first song WWJZ played as Radio Disney was Elvis Presley's cover of "Hound Dog", marking the end of local programming on the station.

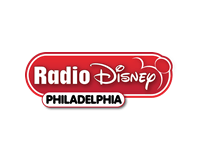
Final Radio Disney logo for WWJZ

On August 13, 2014, Disney put WWJZ and 22 other Radio Disney stations up for sale, to focus on digital distribution of the Radio Disney network. Disney originally planned to temporarily shut down the station on September 26. However, WWJZ remained on the air and continued carrying Radio Disney programming until the completion of its sale. On August 11, 2015, Relevant Radio's parent, the Starboard Media Foundation, agreed to purchase WWJZ for $3.5 million. On September 18, WWJZ dropped the Radio Disney affiliation and went silent. The station began broadcasting Catholic programming, 24 hours a day, when the acquisition was consummated on September 23. Radio Disney programming for the region later moved to the WXTU-HD3 digital subchannel, which has since ceased operations.

== Coverage ==
WWJZ can be heard by day in the Philadelphia metropolitan area, the Jersey Shore, and parts of Delaware and Maryland. The 1,000-watt nighttime signal is heard over Central New Jersey and Philadelphia's northern suburbs.
