= WJBR =

WJBR may refer to:

- WJBR (AM), an AM radio station licensed to serve Seffner, Florida, United States
- WVCW (FM), an FM radio station licensed to serve Wilmington, Delaware, United States, which held the call signs WJBR from 1957 to 1978 and WJBR-FM from 1978 to 2023
- WWTX, an AM radio station licensed to Wilmington, Delaware, which held the call sign WJBR from 1978 to 2003
