= Beru Revue =

American rock band

Beru Revue is an American rock band from Philadelphia, Pennsylvania that played that city's club circuit in the 1980s and reunited in 2006. They debuted at Grendel's Lair in Philadelphia on September 6, 1981.

Although Beru Revue had a strong and loyal local following, they had only one notable radio hit in their seven-year career, with "Hoods A Go-Go". Beru's farewell concert was held at The Chestnut Cabaret on September 24, 1988.

== Original line-up ==
- Bob "Beru" McCafferty – lead vocals
- Greg "T-Bone" Davis – guitar
- Johnny Sacks – bass
- Jerry Healy – guitar
- Buzz Barkley – keyboards
- Tommy "Sir Francis Drake" Pinto – drummer.

== Later history ==
Beru and Davis returned in the early 1990s with a new band, BeruHaHa. In the early 2000s, the members of the band began to talk about holding a reunion, but it soon became clear that health issues would interfere. In October 2004, bassist John Sacks died of colon cancer, and then in December 2005 guitarist Jerry Healy succumbed to emphysema.

The remaining members, along with two replacement musicians (Mark Julian Teague of BeruHaHa and Jerry Getz of Philly band The Daves), finally played reunion concerts on November 3 and 4, 2006, at the Grape Street Pub in Manayunk. Both shows sold out. The band played an additional show on November 22, 2006, to celebrate the 25th anniversary of disc jockey Pierre Robert at radio station WMMR-FM.

On April 28, 2007 and April 12, 2008, the above line-up (abetted on several songs by a horn section) played sold-out shows at the Media Theater in Media, Pennsylvania. Two new songs were debuted at the latter show. Additional live performances have continued through 2018 at various Philadelphia-area venues. These have included the debuts of several new songs, leading to a return to the recording studio in 2009.

== Recordings ==
=== Albums ===
- I Got A Job LP, Straight-Face Records, 1983. (CD reissue, 2011)
- BeruHaHa cassette, 1992(?)
- The Miracle Of Spring EP, Calico Jack Records, 2009
- Tux Do 5 EP, Calico Jack Records, 2009

=== Live albums ===
- Be Careful Tonight LP, Straight-Face Records, 1984.
- Beru Revue Live CD, 1997 (recorded at shows in 1987-88)
- Alive & Well CD, 2008 (live recording from 2006 reunion shows)
