= WIFI =

WIFI may refer to:

- Wi-Fi, a wireless networking technology
- WIfI, a medical classification system of Peripheral artery disease, based on wound, ischemia and foot infection, by the Society for Vascular Surgery
- WIFI (AM), a radio station (1460 AM) licensed to Florence, New Jersey, United States
