= WBEN-FM =

Adult hits radio station in Philadelphia

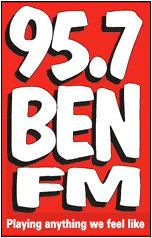
- Philadelphia, Pennsylvania; United States
- Broadcast area: Philadelphia metropolitan area
- Frequency: 95.7 MHz (HD Radio)
- Branding: 95.7 BEN FM

Programming
- Format: Adult hits
- Subchannels: HD2: Oldies

Ownership
- Owner: Beasley Broadcast Group; (Beasley Media Group Licenses, LLC)
- Sister stations: WMGK; WMMR; WPEN; WTEL; WTMR; WWDB; WXTU

History
- First air date: March 14, 1949 (as WFLN)
- Former call signs: WFLN (1949–1956); WFLN-FM (1956–1997); WXXM (1997–1999); WEJM (1999–2001); WMWX (2001–2005)
- Call sign meaning: Benjamin Franklin

Technical information
- Licensing authority: FCC
- Facility ID: 22308
- Class: B
- ERP: 8,900 watts (analog); 175 watts (digital)
- HAAT: 350 meters (1,150 ft)
- Transmitter coordinates: 40°02′20″N 75°14′13″W

Links
- Public license information: Public file; LMS
- Webcast: Listen live; Listen live (via iHeartRadio)
- Website: 957benfm.com

WBEN-FM (95.7 MHz, "95.7 BEN FM") is a commercial radio station licensed to Philadelphia, Pennsylvania. The station is owned by Beasley Broadcast Group and broadcasts an adult hits radio format. The studios and offices are in Bala Cynwyd and the broadcast tower is on Wigard Avenue in the Roxborough section of Philadelphia at (40°2′19.7″N 75°14′12.8″W).

The station plays a mix of 1970s, 1980s and 1990s hits, with some current hot adult contemporary singles, and is named after Benjamin Franklin. The formula originated in Canada as Jack FM. Unlike many adult hits stations, WBEN-FM uses DJs. The station imaging is handled by Howard Cogan, the former voice of Jack FM. Actor John O'Hurley of the TV show Seinfeld previously did the station imaging.

== History ==
=== 1949-1997: Classical ===
The station signed on the air on March 14, 1949, as WFLN, which was started by civic leaders as a "classical music and fine arts" station. It was owned by the Franklin Broadcasting Company and had studios at 8200 Ridge Avenue. The call sign, then as now, referred to Benjamin Franklin, an eighteenth century civic leader in Philadelphia and one of the founding fathers of the United States.

In 1956, the station added an -FM suffix when an AM simulcast was launched on 900 kHz. WFLN-AM-FM was sold in 1988 to Marlin Broadcasting, which added more news, sports and traffic reports to the station. From 1995 to 1997, WFLN was bought and sold five more times. With each purchase, budget cutbacks were instituted and, while maintaining the classical format, the station adopted a more commercial sound with shorter familiar selections heard in most dayparts, in an effort to attract casual fans of classical music.

Finally, the news came at 6 p.m. on September 5, 1997, that Greater Media, which had recently acquired the station, announced it was ending WFLN's classical programming. The last musical opus aired on WFLN was that of Fritz Kreisler's "Schön Rosmarin for Violin and Piano". During a farewell speech for WFLN, Tom Milewski, the chief operating officer for Greater Media, said that the audience interested in classical music had aged and most advertisers were seeking a younger audience; Milewski added that classical music would be best preserved as a non-commercial format. To continue serving Philadelphia's classical audience, WFLN's recordings were donated to WRTI, Temple University's non-commercial radio station. Greater Media would also provide financial support to Temple as WRTI adopted the WFLN classical format during the day. (Three of the WFLN program hosts would join WRTI in their usual time slots, and WRTI continued to program its usual jazz format at night.) The company's support of WRTI also served to deflect criticism that the company was taking away Philadelphia's only classical radio station.

=== 1997-1999: Modern AC ===
After the classical format ended, 95.7 then became WXXM, "Max 95.7", adopting a modern AC format. It was similar to, but more pop-leaning than, alternative rock station Y100. The first song played under the new format was Sheryl Crow's "A Change Would Do You Good." The station reported to radio trade publications as a hot adult contemporary station. WXXM was jockless for the first six months as "Max", and its ratings plummeted with the station's new format. Although ratings improved after WXXM added well-known Philadelphia DJ Paul Barsky to mornings in February 1999, it was not enough to rationalize keeping the format.

=== 1999-2001: Rhythmic oldies ===
At noon on May 13, 1999, in the middle of Sarah McLachlan's "Building a Mystery", the station flipped to rhythmic oldies, playing a blend of urban oldies from the 1960s to the 1980s, disco, classic dance tunes, and some 1970s pop hits, branded as "Jammin' Gold". The first song under the new format was "Back Stabbers" by The O'Jays. On August 30, the station changed its call sign to WEJM. Given Philadelphia's history with the R&B genre, and being the city that started the "Philadelphia Soul" sound, "Jammin' Gold" was initially well received in the market. However, by 2001, the station's ratings began to slip.

=== 2001-2005: Hot AC ===
On June 15, 2001, WEJM became "Mix 95.7", another incarnation of hot AC. On July 17, WEJM changed call signs to WMWX. The station initially leaned toward modern AC, before moving to a more traditional hot AC approach. The station continued to be plagued by mediocre ratings.

=== 2005-present: Adult hits ===
Meanwhile, Infinity Broadcasting (CBS Radio) was in the process of switching some of its FM stations to adult hits. The company used a broad-based adult rock and pop format branded as "Jack FM". Jack FM stations typically had playlists that could encompass up to 2,000 songs, and had proved popular in a number of Canadian radio markets. Stations that adopted the format were mostly under-performers in their previous formats, but a few, such as CBS-owned WCBS-FM in New York City and WJMK in Chicago, were popular oldies stations whose audiences had grown older and not as attractive to advertisers.

With rumors were circulating that CBS was planning to do the same in Philadelphia, by switching WOGL to "Jack FM", Greater Media decided to jump before CBS did. On March 21, 2005, at 5 p.m., after playing "Better Man" by Pearl Jam, WMWX rebranded as "95-7 Ben FM". The first song on "Ben FM" was "Philadelphia Freedom" by Elton John. The call letters were changed to WBEN-FM on May 9, 2005. The "Ben" format is similar to the "Jack FM" stations in terms of playlist size, airing songs from the same decades appealing to the same demographics. WBEN-FM began using the slogan "Playing anything we feel like". WBEN-FM has tweaked its format in recent years to add more classic alternative tracks from the 1980s, 1990s and 2000s.

On July 19, 2016, Beasley Media Group announced it would acquire Greater Media and its 21 stations (including WBEN-FM) for $240 million. The FCC approved the sale on October 6, and the sale closed on November 1.

On February 28, 2019, for one week, Ben FM rebranded as "95.7 Bryce FM" to celebrate the signing of Bryce Harper to the Philadelphia Phillies baseball team. On April 1, 2019, the station switched to classic television theme songs as part of an April Fools Day joke.

== WBEN-FM HD2 ==
WBEN-FM broadcasts using an HD Radio transmitter. In 2006, WBEN added an HD2 digital subchannel to carry a commercial-free rhythmic AC/classic dance format under the name "Club Ben." The format consisted of a mix of 1970s funk and R&B, and ’80s and ‘90s pop/dance music. This format was similar to the former "Jammin' Gold" format and the rhythmic AC format formerly aired on WISX.

The "Club Ben" format signed off on October 3, 2023, and was replaced with WJBR-FM's previous adult contemporary format (branded as WJBR.com), as the original station was sold to VCY America.

As of January 1, 2026, the former WJBR format was changed to a simulcast of the oldies format heard on WMGK HD2.
