= WWDB =

Brokered talk radio station in Philadelphia

- Philadelphia, Pennsylvania; United States
- Broadcast area: Philadelphia metropolitan area
- Frequency: 860 kHz
- Branding: "Talk 860"

Programming
- Format: Brokered programming

Ownership
- Owner: Beasley Broadcast Group, Inc.; (Beasley Media Group Licenses, LLC)
- Sister stations: WBEN-FM; WMGK; WMMR; WPEN; WTEL; WTMR; WXTU

History
- First air date: December 6, 1926
- Former call signs: WFKD (1926–1930); WTEL (1930–1998; 2000)
- Call sign meaning: William and Dolly Banks (former owners of FM station now known as WCUS)

Technical information
- Licensing authority: FCC
- Facility ID: 74085
- Class: D
- Power: 10,000 watts day
- Transmitter coordinates: 40°9′16.38″N 75°22′7.66″W
- Repeater: 97.5 WPEN-HD2 (Burlington, New Jersey)

Links
- Public license information: Public file; LMS
- Webcast: Listen live
- Website: wwdbam.com

WWDB (860 AM) is a commercial radio station licensed to Philadelphia, Pennsylvania, with its studios and offices in the "555 Building" on City Avenue in Bala Cynwyd, Pennsylvania. It is owned by the Beasley Broadcast Group and broadcasts mostly paid brokered programming. Shows on health, money, gardening, home repair, real estate, religion and politics are found on the schedule. Some programs are broadcast in Hungarian, Ukrainian, Yiddish, Italian and other languages. Hosts pay for their time on the air and may advertise their services or products during their programs.

WWDB is a daytimer radio station. Because AM 860 is a clear channel frequency reserved for Class A station CJBC in Toronto, WWDB must go off the air at sunset to avoid interference. It is powered at 10,000 watts, using a directional antenna. The transmitter is off Foundry Road in East Norriton Township. WWDB's tower site is also used by 950 WKDN for its nighttime operations.

== History ==
On December 6, 1926, the station signed on as WFKD. It became WTEL in 1930. It began operating on the 860 frequency in the late 1950s. Before that, it had shared time on AM 1340 with WHAT. Through most of the 1970s, 1980s and 1990s, WTEL was best known as a foreign language broadcaster, with programs in several languages. (The WTEL call sign is now used on AM 610.)

In October 1998, the call letters changed to WWDB. The station began airing a talk format as a complement to sister station to WWDB-FM. Some of the FM station's older personalities were moved to the AM station in an attempt to increase the FM's appeal in younger demographics without alienating older listeners.

The strategy was not successful, and by February 2000, the WTEL call sign had returned, and the station switched to urban gospel music. The gospel format lasted only until November 2000, when the call letters were changed back to WWDB and switched to business talk. Business talk, sometimes augmented with general-interest talk from syndicated personalities such as Don Imus and Mancow Muller, was the station's format until the end of the broadcast day on August 1, 2010.

ESPN Deportes Radio took over the schedule on the next day. The Spanish-language sports programming was dropped after a year, and on June 13, 2011, WWDB began carrying a schedule of brokered programming, some previously heard on WNWR.

The WWDB call letters, which stand for the names of former owners "William and Dolly Banks", were first used in Philadelphia at the former WTDY-FM 96.5 (now WCUS "U-S 96.5") on the FM band in the late 1960s. The station had previously been WHAT-FM. It operated with a jazz format that did not change when the call letters did. In the early 1970s, WWDB-FM tried an adult contemporary format during some hours, then reverted to jazz full-time, then adopted a talk format in 1975. The talk format was one of the first successful ones on the FM band in the United States, lasting until November 2000. Until WWDB-FM's debut, almost all American talk stations were found on AM radio.
