= WJJZ (AM) =

Radio station in Mount Holly, New Jersey (1963–1983)

Mount Holly, New Jersey; United States
- Frequency: 1460 kHz

Programming
- Format: Last format: country music

Ownership
- Owner: West Jersey Broadcasting Company

History
- First air date: December 14, 1963
- Last air date: 1983

Technical information
- Power: 5,000 watts (daytime only)

WJJZ was a radio station broadcasting on 1460 AM in Mount Holly, New Jersey, United States, from 1963 to 1965 and again from 1967 to 1983. It was operated on two separate licenses by two separate groups, each of which ended with authority to continue operations being denied by the Federal Communications Commission (FCC).

== History ==
=== First license ===
By 1960, three applicants sought the use of 1460 kHz in Burlington County: the Burlington Broadcasting Company, owned by William Halpern and Louis Seltzer and proposing operation of the station in Burlington, and the Burlington County Broadcasting Company (co-owned with the Mount Holly Herald daily newspaper) and Mount Holly-Burlington Broadcasting Company, which proposed to build at Mount Holly, respectively. The three applications, mutually exclusive with each other, were designated for comparative hearing, in which major issues included nighttime coverage and protests by two nearby outlets, WFPG in Atlantic City and WBCB at Levittown, Pennsylvania.

In an initial decision, Federal Communications Commission (FCC) hearing examiner Jay A. Kyle selected the Burlington County Broadcasting application in May 1962. Kyle found that the allocation of the station to Mount Holly—which had no licensed radio stations—over Burlington would promote equitable distribution of service, and that the Burlington County Broadcasting application would serve more people than that of Mount Holly-Burlington, headed by John J. Farina.

Appeals of the initial decision at the FCC stretched well into 1963; when Farina's credibility was questioned, he submitted to a lie detector test, believed to be a first in an FCC proceeding. Burlington Broadcasting was finally denied in June 1963, in an initial decision that granted the construction permit to Mount Holly-Burlington.

On December 14, 1963, Burlington County gained its first radio station when WJJZ began broadcasting as a 5,000-watt, daytime-only outlet. The brand-new station aired a middle-of-the-road music format, though an omen as to the rocky history that would ensue was quick to come. On its fourth day of operation, a field mouse entered the transmitter on Burlington Island; it was electrocuted, and the station was silenced for 30 minutes.

Within months, a series of legal problems derailed the station's operations. Burlington Broadcasting challenged the FCC decision against its application in court; the court ordered hearings be held. In July 1964, the station failed to appear at a hearing in Mount Holly; as a result, the company was placed in default and a receiver appointed. Days later, the FCC hearing examiner recommended that the license application be denied and the underlying construction permit be canceled and program testing ended.

In December, the FCC recommended Burlington Broadcasting's application be granted over that of another aspiring owner, the West Jersey Broadcasting Company, owned by Henry H. Bisbee, a Burlington optometrist. However, a panel of the United States Court of Appeals for the District of Columbia Circuit ordered the FCC in March 1965 to accept West Jersey's application and any others made for a station at Mount Holly.

Radio listeners in Burlington County continued to hear WJJZ's broadcasts into 1965.

=== Second license ===
By early 1967, the FCC had four applications pending, from Burlington Broadcasting, Mount Holly-Burlington, West Jersey Broadcasting, and a new entrant, the Burlington-Ocean Broadcasting Company; West Jersey and Burlington-Ocean both specified daytime-only operation. The commission dismissed Mount Holly-Burlington immediately for failure to prosecute. On March 29, 1967, after reaching FCC-approved settlements with the other two competing applicants in the amount of $35,000 (for Burlington Broadcasting) and $7,795 (for Burlington-Ocean Broadcasting), the West Jersey Broadcasting Company received the construction permit for the second WJJZ, requesting the facilities of its predecessor on Burlington Island. The new outlet took to the air on July 13, restoring local broadcasting to Burlington County after more than two years. To get the station, West Jersey was reported to have spent $200,000, more than two-thirds of that in legal fees and the remainder in purchases of equipment owned by the receiver for Mount Holly-Burlington and used in operating the previous incarnation of WJJZ; the new owners quipped that "only the call letters remain the same".

It did not take long for new financial problems to emerge. The station began to fall behind on its payments to the United Press International news agency; in February 1969, UPI sued for $7,649 in unpaid services and damages.

West Jersey filed to renew its license on January 30, 1975. A month later, however, a competing application emerged, from Farina and John H. Vivian, doing business as the Mount Holly Radio Company. The competition was serious for West Jersey, which had made several legal lapses at the FCC. The headline charge, which emerged in 1976, was that the company had improperly paid an additional $25,000 to competing applicant Burlington-Ocean Broadcasting Company, after its principal, Frank Allen, requested funds beyond those in the FCC-approved settlement agreement that reimbursed Burlington-Ocean for its expenses; in addition, a stockholder had concealed option agreements from the commission. By 1977, the station was airing a country music format. At license renewal hearings, Nicholas Grand, one of the three principals in West Jersey, said that West Jersey paid the money as a bribe to local officials in its efforts to obtain a cable television franchise. His partner William McDaniel admitted the payment had been made, but as an "investment", not a bribe.

In 1978, administrative law judge Thomas B. Fitzpatrick recommended denial of the WJJZ license renewal application and found Mount Holly Radio unfit to be a licensee. The decision was later sent by the FCC back to the judge, who confirmed his prior ruling in February 1982. By this time, the station broadcast from Camden's city hall building. The FCC Review Board affirmed the decision in June 1982, calling West Jersey Broadcasting "utterly and irredeemably unfit" and rejecting a proposal to save the facility by selling to a partner who was not involved in the 1967 payoff, which it declared "brazen" and "border[ing] on the incredible".

=== Burlington County radio after WJJZ ===
Burlington County would wait nearly a decade for a new station—and get two in the same month. In 1984, the FCC granted Real Life Broadcasting a construction permit for a new 1460 station in Mount Holly; the group, controlled by the Fountain of Life Church in Florence Township, had the city of license moved there and finally received zoning approval for the transmitter facility on the order of a judge in 1988. The station, originally known as WRLB, began broadcasting as WIFI in November 1992.

Farina and his Mount Holly Radio Company would file for 640 kHz, a clear channel frequency that rule changes allowed to be installed on a high-power outlet in New Jersey, in 1980. Construction began on the facility more than a decade later, in 1991, and WWJZ began broadcasting in November 1992, on Thanksgiving Day. WWJZ itself moved to the Florence site in 1994.

== Notable staff ==
- Diane Allen (née Betzendahl), first female news director in New Jersey; later news anchor in Philadelphia and Chicago and New Jersey state senator
