= John DeBella =

American DJ

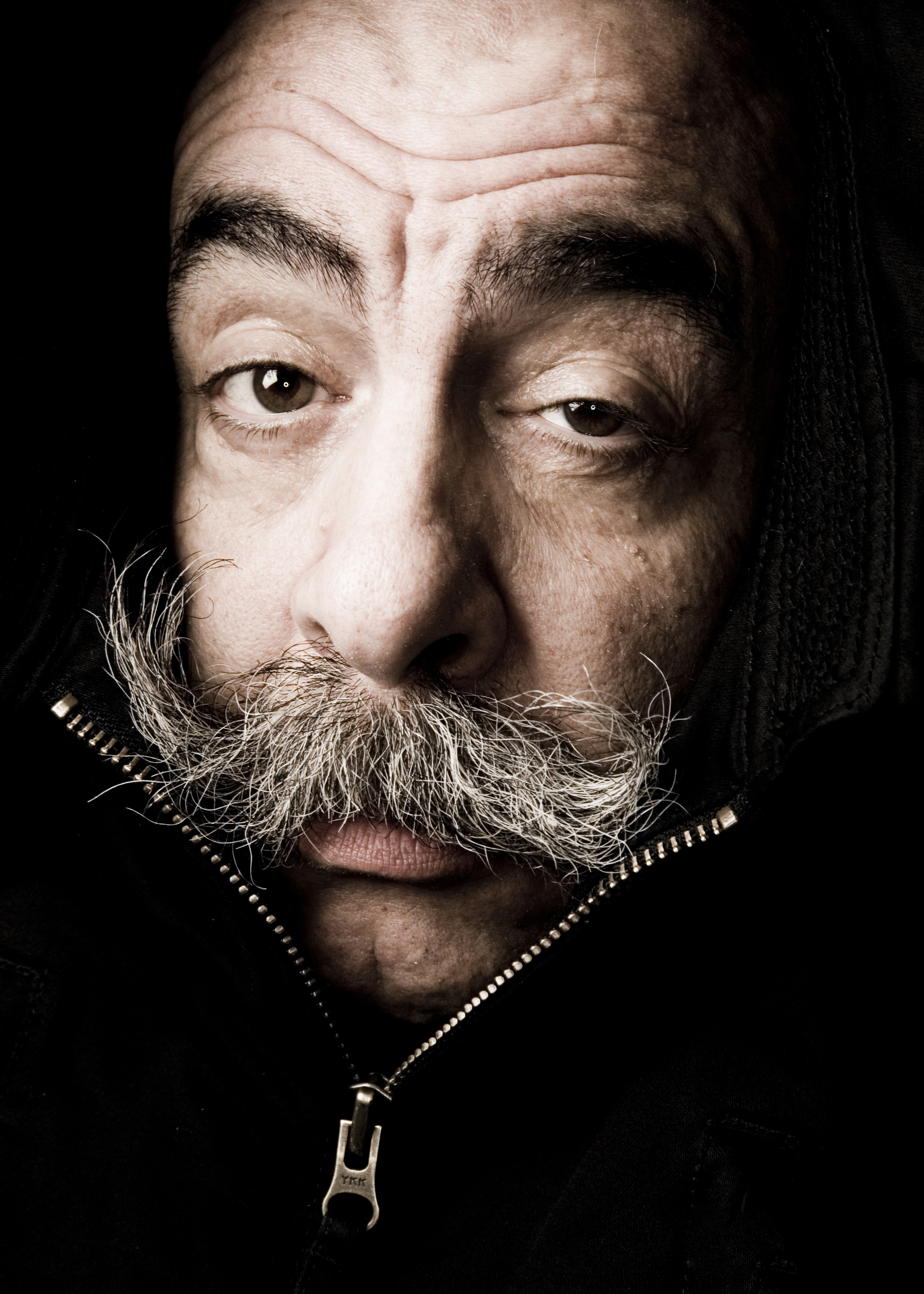
- DeBella in 2005
- Born: Queens, New York City, U.S.
- Education: Hofstra University
- Spouse(s): Annette Gammon; Lisa Sabol
- Presenting career
- Show: The John DeBella Show
- Station: 102.9 WMGK
- Time slot: 6:00–9:00 am
- Style: Disc jockey
- Previous shows: Morning zoo (93.3 WMMR); Afternoons (94.1 WYSP)

John DeBella (born 1949 or 1950) is an American former DJ who played a major role in developing the morning zoo format. Until his retirement in June 2023, he hosted the morning John DeBella Show on 102.9 WMGK-FM in Philadelphia.

== Early life and education ==
DeBella was born in the Astoria section of Queens, New York City, the son of a sanitation worker. He was a hippie and played in a psychedelic rock band called Human Rice. He earned a degree in theater at Hofstra University, where he became a DJ at the college radio station and created skits inspired by Firesign Theater. He wrote for The National Lampoon Radio Hour.

== Career ==
=== Long Island ===
He began his professional radio career as a weekend overnight DJ at WLIR on Long Island.

=== Pittsburgh ===
After being fired for deviating from the station format, in 1979 he became a morning DJ at WPEZ, now WWSW, in Pittsburgh, where he used the line "Pittsburgh—where the sky is yellow and brown and the plants are as smart as the people. It's not the end of the universe. But you can see it from there." He also adopted his trademark handlebar mustache. After eight months, WLIR rehired him as a morning DJ; the Pittsburgh station manager had been planning to change formats and lay him off, but nevertheless bid up the salary he was offered. With an increasingly outrageous on-air style, he helped to introduce WLIR's Dare to be Different new wave format. He befriended singer Joan Jett and promoted her hit "I Love Rock and Roll", for which he received a gold record.

=== Philadelphia ===
From 1982 to 1993, DeBella was a morning host on WMMR-FM in Philadelphia, one of the nation's preeminent rock music stations, where his The DeBella Travesty with a team including former WLIR co-alumnus Mark "The Shark" Drucker, helped develop the morning zoo format. Regular guests included Clay Heery, proprietor of the Comedy Factory in Philadelphia, who appeared on-air as Captain Cranky, and Pat Godwin, a non-student living in a frat house at University of Pennsylvania who parodied hit songs; numerous stand-up comedians, including Jerry Seinfeld, made guest appearances. At the suggestion of George Harris, who became station manager in 1983, the show was renamed Morning Zoo, corresponding to the name originated by Scott Shannon in Florida. He hosted an annual DeBella DeBall, which attracted thousands. That event was held every December 7, and the date was emphasized in promos with Franklin Delano Roosevelt saying "a date which will live in infamy." DeBella would call the state of Delaware "DeBellaware."

By 1987, DeBella's show was number one in the morning ratings, after overtaking first Harvey in the Morning on WIOQ and then the all-news AM station KYW. In 1990, he lost the number one position to Howard Stern's syndicated morning show, The Howard Stern Show, after a ratings battle lasting more than three years; Stern dubbed DeBella "Baldy" and when he bested him, visited Philadelphia and staged a mock funeral for him in Rittenhouse Square.

In fall 1992, WMMR paired DeBella with sports commentator Howard Eskin in a "sports rock" morning format, which backfired, causing a ratings plunge. In spring 1993 DeBella was moved to afternoons at a reduced salary. He left the station in September 1993, signing off with "Have a great day, Philadelphia. Don't take any crap from anybody."

From 1994 to 2001, he had an afternoon show on WYSP, now WIP, the Philadelphia home of The Howard Stern Show. Before starting the job, he went on Stern's show. Station management discouraged him from extensive on-air talk.

In June 2002, he returned to morning radio on WMGK, where he hosted the morning John DeBella Show with cohosts Dave Gibson and Steve Vassalotti. The show usually closed with "Always Look on the Bright Side of Life" by Eric Idle, which had also been a staple ending of his WMMR show.

DeBella retired from broadcasting at the end of June 2023. In the run-up to his announced retirement, WMGK ran a retrospective of his Philadelphia career titled 41 & Done!.

== Community activism ==
Every spring through 2023, DeBella sponsored an annual dog walk at Green Lane Park in the Montgomery County suburbs. He also headed the annual pre-Thanksgiving "MGK Turkey Drop", with CityTeam Philadelphia; listeners are encouraged to dropoff turkeys or cash donations. In 2020, the event collected over 12,000 turkeys.

Beginning in 2007, he hosted an annual Veterans Radiothon to benefit the Philadelphia Veterans Multi-Service Center; raising $157,726 in 2021, and more than $2 million up to that point.

== Honors ==
DeBella was inducted into the Broadcast Pioneers of Philadelphia Hall of Fame in 2014 and the Philadelphia Music Alliance Walk of Fame in April 2023. In June 2023, he was a finalist for the National Radio Hall of Fame. He has won local Emmy awards as a presenter and producer.

== Personal life ==
In September 1986, DeBella married Annette Gammon. The marriage ended in divorce; Howard Stern took advantage of the fact, staging a "divorce party" for DeBella and paying Annette DeBella to appear on his show. After that appearance on Stern, she died in October 1992 of carbon monoxide poisoning in the garage of their mansion. He remarried to Lisa Sabol, a real estate agent and the former wife of Steve Sabol of NFL Films.
