= WPEN (FM) =

Sports radio station in Burlington, New Jersey, serving Philadelphia

- Burlington, New Jersey; United States
- Broadcast area: Philadelphia metropolitan area
- Frequency: 97.5 MHz (HD Radio)
- Branding: 97.5 The Fanatic

Programming
- Format: Sports radio
- Subchannels: HD2: WWDB simulcast (Brokered programming); HD3: WIFI simulcast (Spanish contemporary hit radio)
- Affiliations: ESPN Radio; Philadelphia 76ers Radio Network; Philadelphia Flyers Radio Network; Philadelphia Union Radio Network

Ownership
- Owner: Beasley Broadcast Group; (Beasley Media Group Licenses, LLC)
- Sister stations: WBEN-FM; WMGK; WMMR; WTEL; WTMR; WWDB; WXTU

History
- First air date: September 27, 1949
- Former call signs: WTOA (1949–1971); WPST (1971–2005); WTHK (2005–2006); WJJZ-FM (2006); WJJZ (2006–2008); WNUW (2008–2009); WPEN-FM (2009–2013)
- Former frequencies: 44.7 MHz (1940–1942); 49.9 MHz (1942–1947)
- Call sign meaning: William Penn Broadcasting (original owner of former sister station 950 AM, now WKDN)

Technical information
- Licensing authority: FCC
- Facility ID: 47427
- Class: B
- ERP: 26,000 watts (analog); 1,244 watts (digital)
- HAAT: 208 meters (682 ft)
- Transmitter coordinates: 40°04′57.4″N 75°10′51.6″W

Links
- Public license information: Public file; LMS
- Webcast: Listen live; Listen live (via iHeartRadio)
- Website: www.975thefanatic.com

WPEN (97.5 MHz, "97.5 The Fanatic") is a commercial FM radio station licensed to serve Burlington, New Jersey, in the Philadelphia radio market. The station is owned by the Beasley Broadcast Group through licensee Beasley Media Group, LLC and broadcasts a sports radio format.

WPEN is the flagship station for the NBA's Philadelphia 76ers Radio Network and the NHL's Philadelphia Flyers Radio Network. It also carries Temple University football games and Philadelphia Union MLS games. WPEN has local hosts days and evenings while carrying the nationally syndicated ESPN Radio network nights and some weekend hours. It is also affiliated with the ESPN Radio network.

Studios are located in Bala Cynwyd and the station's broadcast tower is located in Wyndmoor at (40°04′57.0″N 75°10′52.2″W). WPEN broadcasts using HD Radio. Its HD2 subchannel airs a simulcast of WWDB. WPEN's HD3 channel airs a simulcast of WIFI.

== History ==
=== 1940-1971: Early years ===
On November 22, 1940, the Federal Communications Commission granted Mercer Broadcasting Company a construction permit for a new station, licensed to serve Trenton, New Jersey, on 44.7 MHz on the original 42-50 MHz FM broadcast band. On January 29, 1942, the FCC granted Mercer Broadcasting a change to 49.9 MHz. After the FCC created the current FM broadcast band on June 27, 1945, the station was reassigned to 97.5 MHz on July 10, 1947. The station was granted its first license on September 27, 1949, with the WTOA call sign.

The Trenton Times Corporation purchased the station effective June 28, 1962.

Nassau Broadcasting Company, owner of then-new AM outlet WHWH, purchased the station effective December 12, 1964.

=== 1971-1975: MOR ===
On September 13, 1971, WTOA's call sign was changed to WPST as the station rebranded as "Passport Stereo". The station's format was middle of the road music.

=== 1975-2005: Top 40 ===
In August 1975, Nassau Broadcasting owner Herb Hobler hired Phil Gieger as the General Manager. Gieger and morning host/station manager Tom Taylor revamped the station. They initially established an Adult Top 40 format, not as youth-oriented as Top 40 stations heard on AM radio at the time. By fall 1975, the station took off and eventually became the number one station in the market. Over time, the format moved to mainstream Top 40 music.

Taylor remained the morning host until 1987. Other WPST DJs over the years included John Mellon (aka Walt Ballard), Ed Johnson, Doug James, John Brown, Eddie Davis, Trish Merelo, Andy Gury, Brian Douglas, Mel "Toxic" Taylor, Jay Sorensen, Dave Hoeffel, Tom Cunningham, Michelle Stevens, Eric Johnson, Mark Sheppard, Andre Gardner, Phil Simon, Steve Trevelise, Joel Katz, Rich DeSisto, Lee Tobin, Steve Kamer, Lori Johnson, Mark DiDia, Bob Sorrentino, and Scott Lowe.

=== 2005-2006: Classic rock ===
On February 14, 2005, at 5 p.m., 97.5 swapped call signs and formats with sister station 94.5 WTHK. Branded on air as "The Hawk", WTHK had a classic rock format. Like WPST, WTHK was owned by Nassau Broadcasting and licensed as a station serving Trenton. In August 2005, WTHK's city of license was changed from Trenton to Burlington, a New Jersey city 18 miles north of Philadelphia.

These changes were the first two steps of a three-step process designed to maximize the value of the licenses for 94.5 and 97.5. The reallocation of the 97.5 frequency from Trenton to Burlington moved it into the larger and more lucrative Philadelphia radio market and made it possible to move the 97.5 transmitter to a site much closer to Philadelphia. This made 97.5 a much more valuable property, one ripe for sale to a major-market broadcast company regardless of what format it might currently be running. Meanwhile, WPST continued to operate as a popular and profitable Trenton-market station on the 94.5 frequency, which could not be moved.

Nassau Broadcasting chose to leave the final necessary step, the actual relocation of the 97.5 transmitter, to the eventual buyer, which would turn out to be Greater Media. Since Greater Media already had a Philadelphia classic rock station in WMGK, it was almost certain a new format would be chosen for 97.5. Clear Channel's decision to drop smooth jazz from 106.1 left a format hole in the market, and Greater Media decided to fill it with a new version of WJJZ on 97.5.

WTHK signed off on November 15, 2006, at 7 p.m. Shortly after that, Greater Media began airing a simulcast of WMGK, the Hawk's former competitor, on 97.5 as a placeholder. Before WJJZ was to take over, messages urged listeners to reprogram their radios to WMGK to continue enjoying classic rock.

=== 2006-2008: Smooth jazz ===
WJJZ (106.1 FM) ended its smooth jazz format at noon on August 10, 2006, and flipped to a rhythmic adult contemporary format, branded as "Philly's 106.1". Many former WJJZ listeners protested when the format was abandoned in Philadelphia. Much to the delight of fans, Greater Media announced in late October that it would pick up the smooth jazz format for 97.5. The official transfer of ownership took place on November 15, when WTHK signed off and shut down its Trenton transmitter.

The new WJJZ launched on November 17, 2006, at 6 p.m. After a minute of silence, a recording of smooth jazz artists greeted listeners was played (the same recording that was played at the closing of the old WJJZ), as well as a welcome message from Dave Koz. The first song played on the new frequency was the Grover Washington, Jr. tune "Protect the Dream". The new WJJZ began broadcasting from the same tower used by the old WJJZ, located on Mermaid Lane in Wyndmoor, Pennsylvania.

At the station's start, it used Broadcast Architecture's syndicated "Smooth Jazz Network," with musician Dave Koz as the afternoon host, Program Director Michael Tozzi handling middays and Ramsey Lewis' morning show simulcast from WNUA in Chicago. DJs from the old WJJZ were added over time, including Bill Simpson, Frank Childs, Teri Webb, Desirae McCrae, Al Winters and Lisa Fairfax.

=== 2008-2009: Adult contemporary ===
WJJZ's lack of ratings success fueled rumors of a format change. In the summer of 2008, Greater Media began doing listener research to change the station. Among the formats tested was soft AC, hot AC, all-news on FM, FM talk, and a AAA format similar to WIOQ of the early 80s.

On September 5, 2008, at 6:00 p.m., after playing Boyz II Men's "I'll Make Love to You", WJJZ began stunting with a loop of 15 songs, ranging from Blondie's "Heart of Glass" to Avril Lavigne's "Complicated". Three days later, on September 8, at 9 a.m., "Now 97.5" made its debut as a hot AC station, and positioned itself as "a younger approach to today's soft rock", competing with the market AC leader, WBEB ("B-101"). The first song was "Who Knew" by Doylestown native P!nk. On September 12, 2008, WJJZ changed call letters to WNUW to match the "Now" branding.

On October 31, 2008, at 5:00 p.m., the station switched to all-Christmas music. During WNUW's first week in the all-Christmas format, competitor B101 announced it would be sprinkling in Christmas tunes during the weekend of November 8–9, obviously in reaction to WNUW. Then on November 13, B101 flipped to all-Christmas. It was the earliest that B101 made the switch. Shortly thereafter, adult standards AM station WHAT also started playing an all-Christmas format. Then on November 26, in a surprise move, classic hits-formatted WOGL changed its format to all-Christmas for the first time. Including WJBR-FM in nearby Wilmington, Delaware, it gave the Philadelphia market five Christmas formatted stations in 2008.

The first on-air personality to be hired by WNUW was Glenn Kalina, whose morning show debuted on January 5, 2009. After finishing at #3 in the 2008 Holiday ratings, the station's audience fell off when it returned to its Hot AC format. WNUW trailed every other commercial Philadelphia FM and even Trenton station WPST, and Wilmington station WSTW in its last ratings period.

=== 2009-present: Sports talk ===
On October 9, 2009, at 5 p.m., after playing Streetcorner Symphony by Rob Thomas, WNUW flipped to an FM simulcast of WPEN, with the new identity of "97.5 The Fanatic, Powered by ESPN". The call sign was switched from WNUW to WPEN-FM.

Some of the time, the two stations would simulcast; during national live game broadcasts from ESPN Radio or another network, the AM side would carry the games, while WPEN-FM would feature Philadelphia-focused sports talk. On December 21, 2012, AM 950 was sold to Family Radio and became WKDN. After the completion of the sale on January 10, 2013, 97.5 dropped the -FM suffix.

WPEN-FM was Philadelphia's only FM sports station for its first two years until CBS Radio owned rival WIP moved to FM, replacing WYSP.

Beginning with the 2012 NBA Playoffs, WPEN-FM became the flagship station for the Philadelphia 76ers, moving away from WIP-FM, where they were aired for years. Less than a week later, the Philadelphia Flyers announced they too were leaving WIP-FM for WPEN.

On July 24, 2014, Temple University and Greater Media entered into a multi-year agreement for the station to become the official radio broadcaster for Temple football games beginning in the 2014 season.

In 2016, WPEN began airing Philadelphia Soul regular season games, in the Arena Football League.

On July 19, 2016, the Beasley Media Group announced it would acquire Greater Media and its 21 stations (including WPEN) for $240 million. The FCC approved the sale on October 6, and the sale closed on November 1.

On February 21, 2023, the Philadelphia Union and the Beasley Media Group announced a partnership agreement to make WPEN the official radio broadcast partner of the team. The station aired their first Union broadcast on February 25, 2023, in a match against the Columbus Crew.

== Signal note ==
WPEN is short-spaced to three other Class B stations: WENJ 97.3 ESPN (licensed to serve Millville, New Jersey), WRVV The River 97.3 (licensed to serve Harrisburg, Pennsylvania) and WALK-FM WALK 97.5 (licensed to serve Patchogue, New York).

WENJ and WRVV both operate on 97.3 MHz, a first adjacent channel to WPEN. The distance between WPEN's transmitter and WENJ's transmitter is 57 miles, while the distance between WPEN's transmitter and WRVV's transmitter is 91 miles, as determined by FCC rules. The minimum distance between two Class B stations operating on first adjacent channels according to current FCC rules is 105 miles.

WALK-FM and WPEN operate on the same channel and the distance between the stations' transmitters is 125 miles as determined by FCC rules. The minimum distance between two Class B stations operating on the same channel according to current FCC rules is 150 miles.

WPEN uses a directional antenna to reduce its signal toward the southeast and the west, in the direction of WENJ and WRVV.

== HD Radio ==
=== WPEN HD2 ===
WPEN's HD2 digital subchannel formerly broadcast Classical music. As of December 2023, the subchannel now airs a simulcast of WWDB.

=== WPEN HD3 ===
WPEN's HD3 digital subchannel formerly broadcast a Spanish CHR format branded as "Supra Radio" (which was simulcast on translator W237EH 95.3 FM in Pennsauken, New Jersey).

In October 2021, WPEN-HD3 began broadcasting Spanish tropical music known as "Ritmo FM," which was formerly broadcast on WIFI (AM 1460).

On January 15, 2024, WPEN-HD3 and W253DG switched to a simulcast of Spanish CHR-formatted WIFI 1460 AM Florence, NJ, branded as "Maxima 92.9".
