= WIFI (AM) =

Spanish-language contemporary hit radio station in Florence, New Jersey

- Florence Township, New Jersey; United States
- Broadcast area: Philadelphia metropolitan area
- Frequency: 1460 kHz
- Branding: Maxima 92.9

Programming
- Language: Spanish
- Format: Contemporary hit radio

Ownership
- Owner: Miguel Amador; (Ritmo Broadcasting, LLC)
- Operator: The Voice Radio Network

History
- First air date: November 1992
- Former call signs: WRLB (1984–1992)

Technical information
- Licensing authority: FCC
- Facility ID: 55310
- Class: B
- Power: 5,000 watts (day); 500 watts (night)
- Transmitter coordinates: 40°4′53″N 74°47′41″W
- Translators: 92.9 W225DJ (Burlington); 104.1 W281CL (Cherry Hill)
- Repeater: 97.5 WPEN-HD3 (Burlington)

Links
- Public license information: Public file; LMS
- Webcast: Listen live
- Website: maxima929.com

WIFI (1460 kHz) is a commercial AM radio station licensed to Florence, New Jersey, and serving the Philadelphia metropolitan area. It is owned by Ritmo Broadcasting, but operated by The Voice Radio Network. It airs a Spanish contemporary hit radio format. Its studios are on Broad Street in Trenton, New Jersey.

By day, WIFI is powered at 5,000 watts, and at night, it reduces power to 500 watts to protect other stations on 1460 AM. It uses a directional antenna at all times, from its transmitter facility on Burlington-Columbus Road in Burlington.

Programming is heard on two FM translators; W225DJ at 92.9 MHz in Burlington, and W281CL at 104.1 in Cherry Hill. Programming is also heard on WPEN-HD3 in Burlington.

== History ==
=== WRLB and WIFI ===
The station received its construction permit on June 7, 1984, and was given the call sign WRLB. On February 1, 1992, while still not on the air, the station changed its call sign to WIFI. This call sign had been used for some 20 years on a Top 40 radio station in Philadelphia, 92.5 WIFI-FM (now WXTU). WIFI officially signed on the air in November 1992. It ran a brokered programming format under the "MyWifi 1460" brand.

The 1460 frequency had previously been used in Burlington County by WJJZ, a daytime-only station licensed to Mount Holly, New Jersey. Its transmitter site was on Burlington Island. Two incarnations of WJJZ operated, both losing their licenses over corporate problems, between 1963 and 1983.

=== Changes in management ===
In 2008, Florence Broadcasting Partners led by John Forsythe took over operations of the station under a time brokerage agreement with Real Life Broadcasting. On November 1, 2013, the operating contract between Real Life Broadcasting and Florence Broadcasting expired and was not renewed. The station was then operated by Omega Broadcasting, LLC, which programmed urban gospel music.

In 2013, WIFI became one of the first American broadcast stations to use 100% solar power for its daytime transmissions. A few years later, WIFI switched to Christian radio programming as "Life Radio".

=== Ritmo Broadcasting ===
In November 2020, Ritmo Broadcasting began managing WIFI, with a contemporary hit radio format, branded "WIFI 92.9".

Ritmo Broadcasting acquired WIFI and translator W225DJ effective March 1, 2021, at a purchase price of $275,000. On April 16, the station rebranded as "Ritmo 92.9", and began playing tropical music.

On October 20, WIFI changed its format from tropical to Spanish-language adult contemporary, branded as "Amor 92.9". At the same time, Ritmo Broadcasting moved the Spanish tropical formatted "Ritmo 92.9" over to 98.5 W253DG and 97.5 WPEN-HD3.

On March 24, 2022, at midnight, WIFI once again flipped its format, to rhythmic contemporary, and returned to its previous branding WIFI 92.9. The station launched its new website on March 25. This however was short lived, on March 29, WIFI flipped back to Spanish AC Amor 92.9 for a few days, and on April 4, WIFI flipped back to rhythmic CHR. On April 11, after seven days of rhythmic CHR, WIFI went silent.

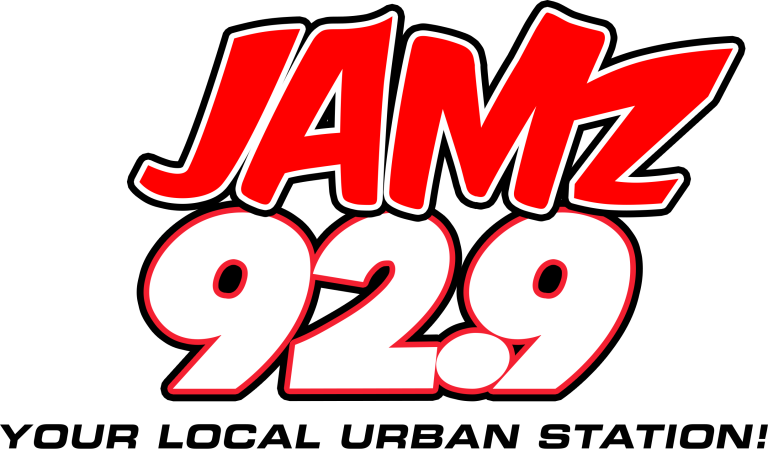
Logo as "Jamz 92.9"

On April 21, WIFI flipped to urban contemporary as Jamz 92.9. On March 6, 2023, WIFI changed to a more CHR-oriented format of urban Top 40 music, keeping the "Jamz 92.9" brand.

On January 15, 2024, The Voice Radio Network agreed to acquire FM translator W281CL from Ritmo Broadcasting at a price of $90,000. The Voice Radio Network also began operating WIFI, flipping the format to Spanish CHR under The Voice Radio Network's "Maxima" branding as "Maxima 92.9". Later in 2024, The Voice Radio acquired WNJE to launch a second Spanish-language format (regional Mexican "La Raza") in Trenton to carry on 98.5 W253DG, which operates on the same tower as W281CL.

== Translators ==
Broadcast translators for WIFI
Call sign	Frequency	City of license	FID	ERP (W)	HAAT	Class	Transmitter coordinates	FCC info
W225DJ	92.9 FM	Burlington, New Jersey	203145	240	45 m (148 ft)	D	40°4′58.2″N 74°47′37.2″W	LMS
W281CL	104.1 FM	Cherry Hill, New Jersey	141368	40	51 m (167 ft)	D	39°56′3″N 74°53′38″W	LMS
