= Chestnut Cabaret =

Coordinates: 39°57′11.0″N 75°12′6.9″W

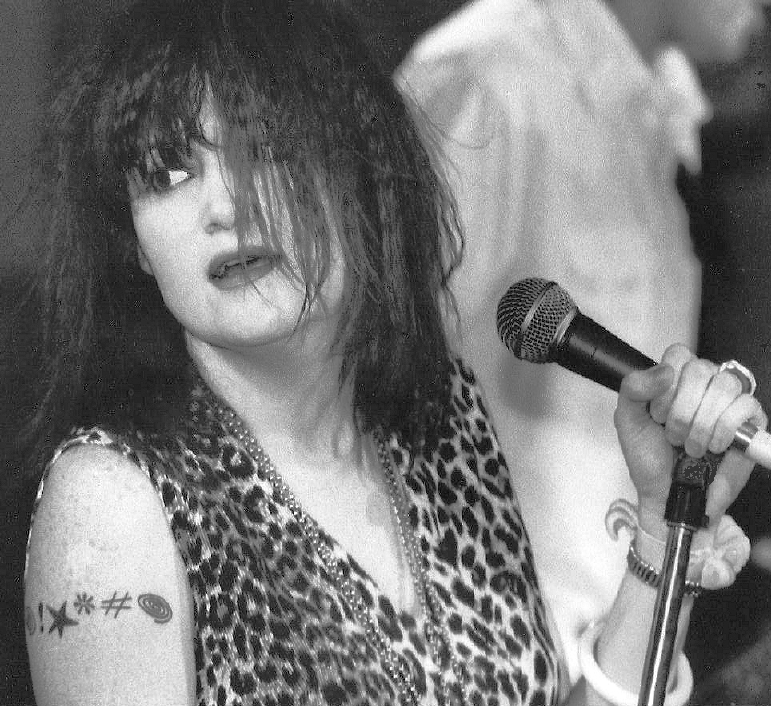
Exene Cervenka performing with X at the Chestnut Cabaret in July 1986

Chestnut Cabaret was a nightclub located at 38th and Ludlow Streets in Philadelphia, Pennsylvania. It opened in 1978 and closed in 1994, then it reopened in 2009 renamed the Blockley before its closure in 2013.

== History ==
Many famous performers played the Chestnut Cabaret, including:

- Albert Collins
- Al Stewart
- Alex Chilton
- Alien Sex Fiend
- Albert King
- Asleep at the Wheel
- Average White Band
- Bachman-Turner Overdrive
- Barenaked Ladies
- BeauSoleil
- Beru Revue
- Big Country
- Blondie
- Blues Traveler
- Blue Öyster Cult
- Bootsy's Rubber Band
- Branford Marsalis
- Buddy Guy
- Burning Spear
- Buster Poindexter
- Butthole Surfers
- Buzzcocks,
- Camper Van Beethoven
- Chris Whitley
- Chris Isaak
- Collective Soul
- Concrete Blonde
- The Connells
- Consolidated
- MC 900 Ft. Jesus
- David Bromberg
- De La Soul
- Dead Milkmen
- Debbie Harry
- Dee Dee Ramone
- Devo
- Dirty Dozen Brass Band
- Dizzy Gillespie
- Donovan
- Dread Zeppelin
- Dr. John
- Electric Love Muffin
- Emerson, Lake & Palmer
- Extreme Championship Wrestling
- Fishbone
- Gene Loves Jezebel
- Gil Scott-Heron
- Guy Clark
- Hanoi Rocks
- Hardline
- The Hooters
- House of Love
- Hothouse Flowers
- Ice-T/Body Count
- Jack Bruce/Ginger Baker
- Jane Siberry
- Jesus Jones
- Jesus and Mary Chain
- John Lee Hooker
- John Entwistle
- John Mayall
- Johnny Winter
- Judy Collins
- Kid Creole and the Coconuts
- Killing Joke
- King's X
- Kirsty MacColl
- Kitchens of Distinction
- Krokus
- Larry Carlton
- Leon Russell
- Little Feat
- Living Colour
- Marillion
- Meat Loaf
- Meat Puppets
- Midge Ure
- Modern English
- Mojo Nixon
- Naked Raygun
- Nine Inch Nails
- Night Ranger
- NRBQ
- Parliament-Funkadelic
- Phish
- Pogues
- The Pretenders
- Psychic TV
- Renaissance (band)
- Ramones
- Red Hot Chili Peppers
- Richard Thompson
- Robin Trower
- The Roches
- Ronnie Montrose
- Shriekback
- Skinny Puppy
- Stanley Clarke
- Stanley Jordan
- Steel Pulse
- Steve Forbert
- Sun Ra
- The Bears (featuring Adrian Belew)
- The Black Crowes
- The Fall
- The Fixx
- The Radiators
- The Replacements
- The Tubes
- They Might Be Giants
- Third World
- 'til tuesday
- Toto
- Tower of Power
- Violent Femmes
- Warren Zevon
- Wire
- Wynton Marsalis
- X
- Yellowman
- Zonic Shockum

== See also ==
- Trocadero Theatre
