= WVCW (FM) =

Religious radio station in Wilmington, Delaware

- Wilmington, Delaware; United States
- Broadcast area: Philadelphia metropolitan area (Philadelphia-Camden-Wilmington)
- Frequency: 99.5 MHz (HD Radio)

Programming
- Format: Christian radio
- Subchannels: HD2: VCY Spanish
- Network: VCY America

Ownership
- Owner: VCY America, Inc.

History
- First air date: January 31, 1957
- Former call signs: WJBR (1957–1978); WJBR-FM (1978–2023)
- Call sign meaning: VCY America Wilmington

Technical information
- Licensing authority: FCC
- Facility ID: 14374
- Class: B
- ERP: 50,000 watts (analog); 2,000 watts (digital)
- HAAT: 152 meters (499 ft)
- Transmitter coordinates: 39°50′2.4″N 75°31′25.7″W
- Translator: See § Translators

Links
- Public license information: Public file; LMS
- Webcast: Listen live
- Website: www.vcy.org

WVCW (99.5 MHz) is a non-commercial FM radio station licensed to Wilmington, Delaware. Owned by VCY America, the station serves the Philadelphia metropolitan area, including Philadelphia. The WVCW transmitter is located 8 miles north of downtown Wilmington on Bellows Drive, less than 1/4 mile from the Pennsylvania state line. Besides a standard analog transmission, WVCW broadcasts over HD Radio.

The station is best known for its 67-year legacy as WJBR and WJBR-FM, a Delaware-targeted adult contemporary station, which was consistently rated as one of the top stations in the Wilmington area, even amidst competition from Philadelphia stations.

== History ==
On January 31, 1957, WJBR signed on as a stand-alone FM station, with no AM counterpart. It was founded by a father and son team, John B. Reynolds Sr. and John B. Reynolds Jr. The call sign was based on the founders' initials. John Sr. began the radio station because his son was "a strong believer in the future of FM". The station originally broadcast a classical and light music format. WJBR's format eventually evolved into beautiful music and the station was branded as JBR 100. It used the slogan "Just Beautiful Radio".

In 1976, the Reynolds family acquired another Wilmington radio station, WTUX, to combine with WJBR. WTUX was a 1,000 watt daytimer, carrying a middle of the road music format. In 1978, WJBR's call sign was changed to WJBR-FM. WTUX's call sign was then switched to WJBR, and the format flipped to beautiful music, to give WJBR listeners the choice of hearing the station on AM or FM. Over time, the station's power was increased to 2,500 watts in the daytime and nighttime service was added at 32 watts.

In the early 1980s, WJBR-AM-FM added more soft vocals to attract a younger audience. John B Reynolds Jr. sold WJBR-AM-FM in 1985 to CRB Broadcasting, which completed the transition from easy listening to an all-vocal soft adult contemporary sound. CRB changed its name to Commodore Media and was eventually purchased by Capstar Broadcasting.

In March 2000, Capstar sold WJBR-FM to the NextMedia Group for $32.4 million. Capstar retained WJBR, and later merged into Clear Channel Communications, which was renamed iHeartMedia. The AM station is now a Fox Sports Radio station, WWTX, and remains owned by iHeartMedia.

In February 2007, Beasley Broadcast Group acquired WJBR-FM from NextMedia for a reported $42 million.

In August 2023, Beasley agreed to sell WJBR-FM to VCY America for $5 million, marking VCY's entrance into both the Philadelphia/Wilmington area. The final day for the on-air staff was October 4; two staffers, Justin Franiak and Eric Johnson, remained with Beasley in Philadelphia at WXTU and WMGK respectively. An automated version of WJBR-FM's programming would continue on the station's website and the second HD Radio channel of WBEN-FM in Philadelphia until the end of 2025. Beasley also moved the WJBR call sign to an AM radio station in Seffner–Tampa, Florida, while VCY America relaunched 99.5 as WVCW, a call sign that took effect on October 7.

== HD Radio and translators ==
As WJBR-FM, the station's second HD Radio channel formerly broadcast a Spanish rhythmic / tropical format branded as Maxima 104.1, which was simulcast on a translator in Millville, New Jersey, W281CM (104.1). Its third channel broadcast a gospel format branded as Philly's Favor 100.7, which was simulcast on a translator in Mount Holly, New Jersey, W264BH (100.7 FM), which broadcast to the Philadelphia radio market. After the sale, those agreements nullified, with VCY America eventually re-activating WVCW-HD2 to carry its Spanish service.
