= WKDN (AM) =

Family Radio station in Philadelphia

- Philadelphia, Pennsylvania; United States
- Broadcast area: Philadelphia metropolitan area
- Frequency: 950 kHz

Programming
- Language: English
- Format: Christian radio
- Network: Family Radio

Ownership
- Owner: Family Radio; (Loam Media, Inc.)

History
- First air date: April 19, 1929
- Former call signs: WLBA (1926–1927); WPSW (1927–1929); WPEN (1929–2012)
- Former frequencies: 1270 kHz (1926–1927); 1480 kHz (1927); 1450 kHz (1927–1928); 1500 kHz (1928–1934); 920 kHz (1934–1941)
- Call sign meaning: Camden, New Jersey (call sign formerly used on 800 AM and 106.9 FM, which are licensed to Camden)

Technical information
- Licensing authority: FCC
- Facility ID: 25095
- Class: B
- Power: 43,000 watts (day); 21,000 watts (night)
- Transmitter coordinates: 39°58′28.4″N 75°16′17.7″W (day); 40°9′15.4″N 75°22′8.7″W (night)

Links
- Public license information: Public file; LMS
- Webcast: Listen live
- Website: www.familyradio.org

WKDN (950 kHz) is an American AM radio station licensed to Philadelphia, Pennsylvania, and serving the Philadelphia market. WKDN is owned and operated by Family Radio.

== History ==
=== Early years ===
WKDN was first licensed, as WLBA, to the Philadelphia School of Wireless Telegraphy (J. C. Van Horn) on December 17, 1926, originally as a 50-watt station on 1270 kHz. These call letters were randomly assigned from a sequential roster of available call signs, moreover, in early 1927 the call letters were changed to WPSW. In early 1929 WPSW was acquired by the William Penn Broadcasting Company, which changed WPSW's call sign to WPEN. The William Penn company also acquired its time-sharing partner on 1500 kHz, WALK in Willow Grove, which was shut down.

In its early years, WPEN was known for Italian-language programming, and was co-owned with another major Italian-oriented station, WOV in New York City. Beginning in November 1929, Sunday Breakfast Rescue Mission broadcast their Sunday morning services from their 800-person homeless shelter and soup kitchen. The most notable speaker was Percy Crawford who spoke consistently to the crowd of homeless men.

In 1934, WPEN moved to 920 kHz, now sharing time with another Philadelphia station, WRAX. (On May 25, 1928, the Federal Radio Commission's General Order 32 had notified 164 stations, including WRAX, that "From an examination of your application for future license it does not find that public interest, convenience, or necessity would be served by granting it." However, WRAX had successfully convinced the commission that it should remain licensed.) WPEN and WRAX were merged in 1938, with WPEN the surviving station. In March 1941, WPEN moved to 950 kHz, as part of the frequency shifts due to the implementation of the North American Regional Broadcasting Agreement.

During the mid-1940s, WPEN was owned by the Philadelphia Bulletin newspaper; in 1948, the newspaper bought the more powerful WCAU and sold WPEN to the local Sun Ray Drug Store chain. As entertainment programming moved from radio to television, the station evolved into a popular music format in the early 1950s. The music at that time consisted of artists such Perry Como, Frank Sinatra, Doris Day, Mills Brothers, Tommy Dorsey, Bing Crosby, Peggy Lee, Nat King Cole, Pat Boone, Tony Bennett, and many others. At this time, a show called the "950 Club" began as well.

In the early 1950s, WPEN became one of the pioneers of late night live audience talk radio. Steve Allison, formerly of Boston, was host of a five or six nights a week radio show from 11:30 pm–2:00 am. This show was broadcast from the "Ranch Room" restaurant on the station's ground floor building on Walnut Street between 22nd and 23rd streets. WPEN was one of the first broadcasters in the country to use a live seven-second delay tape system. In addition to live guests, Steve Allison took telephone calls from listeners. Teddy Reinhart was the producer. Allison had guests such as Eddie Fisher, Billy Eckstein and numerous local politicians at the Ranch Room. Many evenings Allison showed up for work in a tuxedo. In the late 1950s, Frank Ford hosted the late evening talk show from the restaurant studio. Jim Reeves could be seen doing newscasts from a second floor studio.

Before the Steve Allison show, radio personality Art Raymond ("The Man in the Black Sombrero") hosted a live Latin music dance program from the Ranch Room. Years later Raymond hosted Jewish music programs featuring Klezmer music on radio stations in New York City, Philadelphia and Florida.

In the late 1950s, rock and roll began to dominate the chart. WPEN opted, though, to remain a non-rock station but played some of the softer songs by artists like The Platters, Elvis Presley, Everly Brothers, Brenda Lee, and others. By the mid-1960s, WPEN was also playing softer songs by The Beatles, The Association, The 5th Dimension, Tom Jones, The Mamas & the Papas, The Righteous Brothers, and others. In the early 1970s, artists like The Carpenters, Barbra Streisand, Neil Diamond, James Taylor, and others became core artists. Still all along, artists like Sinatra and Cole, as well as Big Bands, were heard on WPEN. The station was a news-intensive MOR format. Also, during the 1960s, an evening interview show hosted by Frank Ford was broadcast on weekdays. It was held in a converted night club near 22nd and Walnut Streets, so the public was allowed to sit in on all broadcasts.

Around 1967, WPEN became an affiliate of the NBC Radio Network. Around 1969, the station left NBC, and management decided to seriously challenge WIP, Philadelphia's dominant MOR music station. Some WIP personalities were lured to WPEN, including Tom Brown, and an extensive promotional campaign was launched with the station billing itself as "The New 95." However, listeners did not respond in large numbers and the station went into a gradual decline. By about 1973, the station's financial condition was so poor that it began signing off at midnight to save money, and ownership began to actively market the operation to potential buyers.

=== Greater Media takes over ===
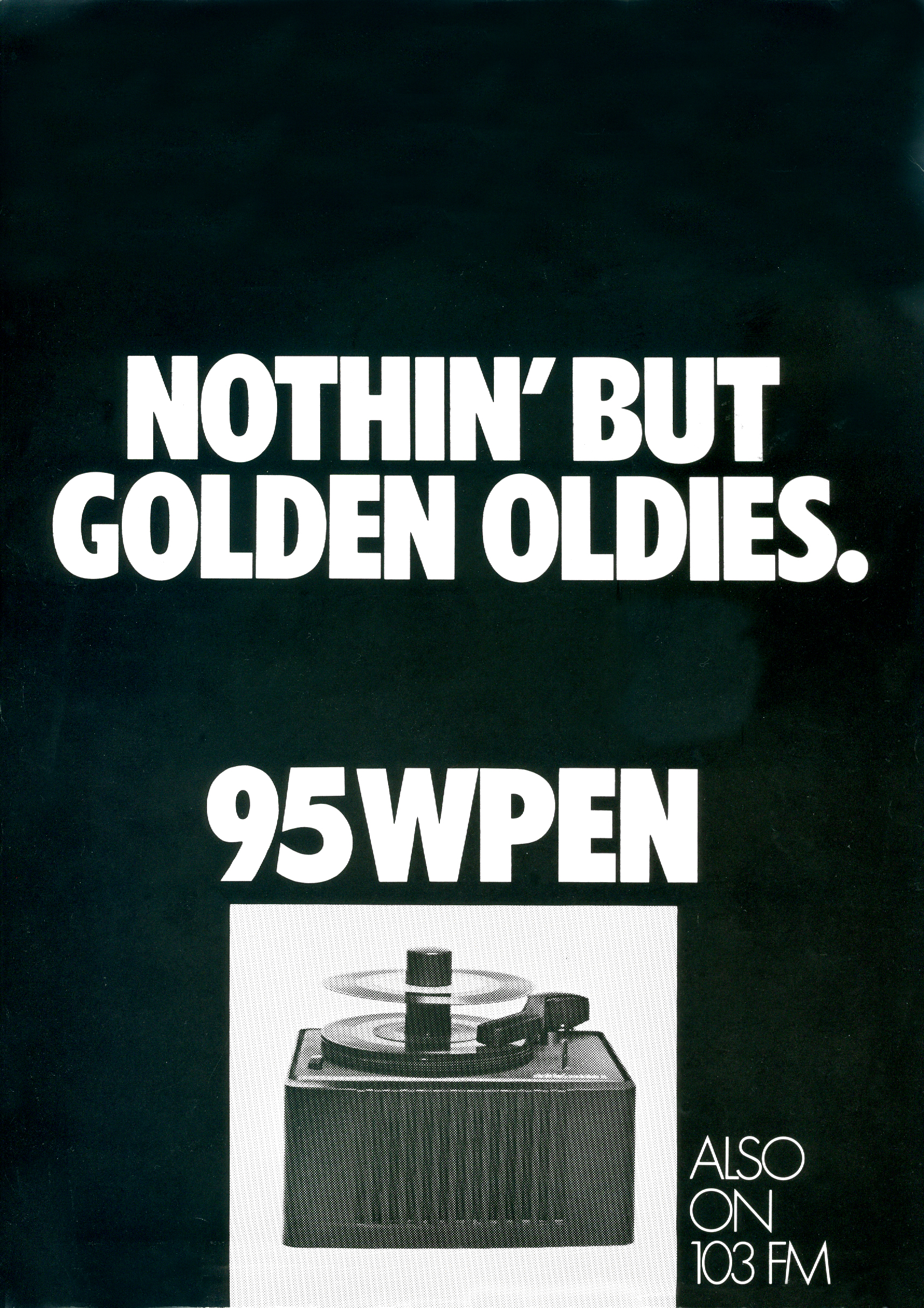
FIrst ad campaign for the oldies format.

At the end of 1974, WPEN was sold to Greater Media, along with co-owned WPEN-FM (now known as WMGK). When the deal closed in January 1975, Greater Media immediately took the stations off the air for some badly needed engineering upgrades. In the spring, WPEN returned to the air as "95PEN" with an oldies format under program director Julian Breen and later, Peter Mokover. Mike St. John made his Philly debut at this time along with Geoff Fox, Paul Cassidy, Loren Owens, Mike Landry, Rick Harris and Bobby "Dashboard" Dark.

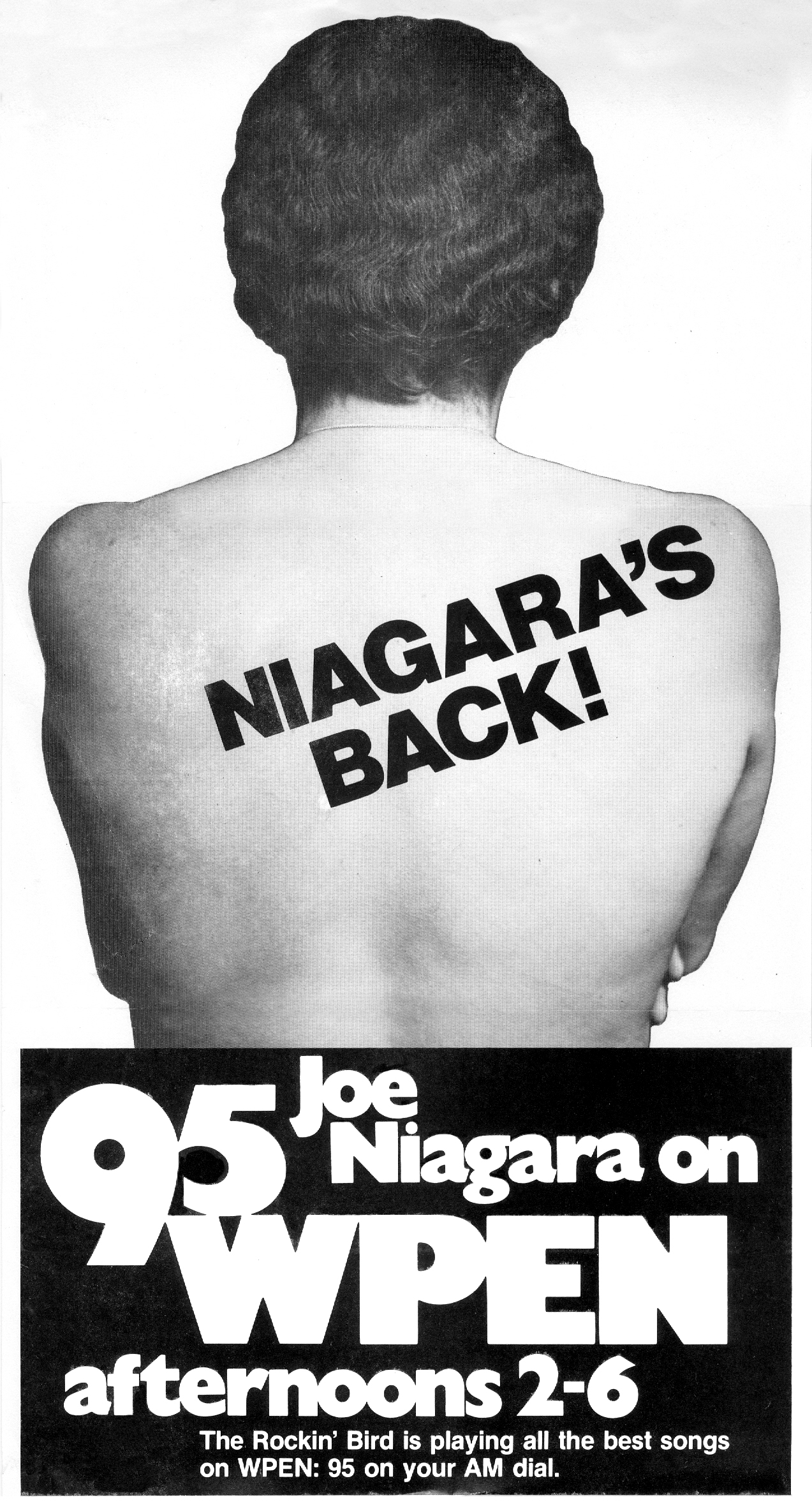
Ad announcing the return of Joe Niagara

Joe Niagara soon joined the station with an afternoon drive show. The revived station originally played rock and roll hits from about 1955 to 1963, but newer music was added to the playlist over time; by the late '70s, the music mix was really closer to Adult Contemporary than oldies. Ratings were never spectacular, and WPEN opted to change formats in 1979.

In 1979, WPEN dumped the oldies format and became nostalgia, featuring big band hits and adult standards. The station became known as "950 WPEN, The Station Of The Stars". The station featured adult standards of the 1940s, 1950s, and 1960s, along with some big bands of the 1930s and 1940s. The station also mixed in some softer rock hits of the 1950s through the 1970s known as "baby boomer pop" by some. Over the years, many radio legends joined "The 950 Family", like Ken Garland, Joe Niagara, Bill "Wee Willie" Webber, Dick Clayton, Jerry Stevens, Joe Harnett, Bill Wright, Sr, Tom Moran, Andy Hopkins, Andy Kortman and Kim Martin. Joe Grady and Ed Hurst also returned to host a new version of the original "950 Club" on weekday afternoons. Ed Hurst would later revive the "Steel Pier Show" weekend afternoons. The station's "Adult Standards/Nostalgia" format was an original concept of Julian Breen, and later programmed by Joe Taylor, Paul Mitchell, Dean Tyler, Stan Martin, Charlie Mills and Bob Craig. Ed Klein, known as "The Doctor" of music was WPEN's music director during WPEN's heyday as a standards station and he often filled-in on the air for vacationing full-time talent.

The station also had an emphasis on news and information. The format was adjusted at various times. In the 1980s, WPEN played more soft rock during the day and more big bands in the evening hours. But adult standards was always the focus of the station. WPEN, for many years, was the top rated radio station of its type anywhere.

In the late 1990s, WPEN began airing some paid programming during the day on weekends. Ratings were still decent, but demographics were making it difficult to sell advertising. The weekend paid programming would be used to raise revenue for the station to be able to be profitable. While the station did not ever strictly play standards and featured some soft rock mixed in during much of the day, they changed focus in 2001. At that point, WPEN cut back on big bands and added more 1950s and 1960s rock and roll to the playlist. While there was no hard rock, there were a decent amount of pop/rock oldies one would not expect to find on an adult standards station. In 2003, WPEN became the radio home of Jerry Blavat. He would host a 1950s and 1960s rock and roll oldies show playing a lot of rock and roll cuts WPEN still normally did not play at that point. Still, even in 2003, WPEN was still focused on the standards vocalists. WPEN had been also mixing in contemporary standards artists like Michael Bublé, Norah Jones, Harry Connick Jr., and others since the mid-1990s.

In late 2001, WPEN agreed to become the flagship radio station of the Philadelphia Phillies for the 2002 through 2004 seasons. This led to increased attention for the station, but not all of it was favorable. Many listeners in outlying suburbs complained that they could not pick up the games, which had previously been on the stronger signal of WPHT (the weak signal also was a favorite of pundits and jokesters, one of which quipped that WPEN stands for "We Practically Emit Nothing"). Although Greater Media had plans to improve WPEN's signal, they could not be implemented during the term of the contract. The Phillies returned to WPHT for the 2005 season.

=== Back to golden oldies ===
On September 1, 2004, due to declining advertising, WPEN dropped adult standards abruptly in favor of returning to oldies, playing only music from 1954 to 1965. Some of the airstaff remained. Jim Nettleton and Christy Springfield came over from WOGL later that year. WOGL had moved away from pre-1964 oldies, and Greater Media sought to win away listeners who preferred music of that era. Artists featured on WPEN included Sam Cooke, Elvis Presley, Billy Stewart, Bill Haley, Fats Domino, Ricky Nelson, Marvelettes, Everly Brothers, Jerry Butler, Beach Boys, The Four Seasons, Jackie Wilson, Bobby Vee, and others.

Ratings declined even more. The station also continued its paid programming during the day on Saturdays and Sundays. There were plans to end these infomercials and specialty talk shows once advertising grew, but this never happened. By November 2004, WPEN began to add more late 1960s music by the Beatles, Four Tops, The 5th Dimension, Young Rascals, The Hollies, along with many one hit wonders. The station also added a lot of 1960s Philadelphia-based soul. The station's long-awaited signal upgrade partially became reality in 2005, as its nighttime power was increased from 5,000 to 21,000 watts and the Montgomery County towers of daytimer WWDB became WPEN's new nighttime transmitter site. The station began to gain some ratings, but the growth was not fast enough.

=== Sports talk comes to 950 AM ===
In August 2005, WPEN announced that they would be ending the oldies format in favor of sports talk. The change became effective on October 3, 2005. WPEN affiliated with Fox Sports Radio.

In early 2007, WPEN was able to increase its daytime power from 5,000 to 25,000 watts. Previously nondirectional during daylight hours, it switched to directional operation, using the three towers it had previously used for nighttime broadcasting at its longtime transmitter site in the Overbrook Park section of Philadelphia. In June 2008, WPEN was granted a construction permit for a second daytime power increase, this time to 43,000 watts.

On March 2, 2007, a blogger reported the possibility that the station could change their slogan to "Sports Radio 950", after discovering the registrations of the domains mysportsradio950.com and sportsradio950online.com. On March 12, 2007, WPEN started calling itself "Sports Radio 950" or "Philly's Sports Radio 950". On April 1, 2008, WPEN dropped Fox Sports and became the new home of ESPN Radio in Philadelphia, replacing WPHY (a station in Trenton, New Jersey, which had served as Philadelphia's ESPN Radio affiliate prior to January 7 of that year), with the new tagline being "950 ESPN Philadelphia" and carried ESPN Radio programming including its Major League Baseball broadcasts with the State Farm Home Run Derby, the All-Star Game and World Series (the latter two coming over from WPHT), the NBA, the Bowl Championship Series and Mike and Mike in the Morning.

=== 97.5 The Fanatic ===
On October 9, 2009, WPEN's sports format began to be simulcast on WPEN-FM under the identity of "97.5 The Fanatic." Most, if not all, of their programming was simulcast, with few programs from the national ESPN Radio lineup. The on-air lineup included Mike & Mike in the Morning from ESPN Radio, and local shows with Brian Baldinger, Harry Mayes, Tony Bruno, Mike Missanelli, Jon Marks and Tom Byrne. WPEN-FM also became the flagship station of the Philadelphia 76ers and Philadelphia Flyers in 2012.

=== Sale to Family Radio ===
Greater Media announced on September 21, 2012, that it would sell WPEN AM to Family Radio, which began airing its Christian radio programming on the station on December 21, 2012, at 6:00 p.m., ending the simulcast of WPEN-FM. At that time, after 83 years of broadcasting in Philadelphia, WPEN signed off for the last time, and the station then returned to the air under the call letters WKDN, a call sign previously used in the market on 800 AM (now WTMR) and 106.9 FM (now WKVP). The 106.9 facility was Family Radio's previous Philadelphia station, which they had been forced to sell earlier in the year, after spending $100 million and taking out large loans to promote their discredited rapture prediction.
