= Pierre Robert (radio personality) =

American radio personality (1955–2025)

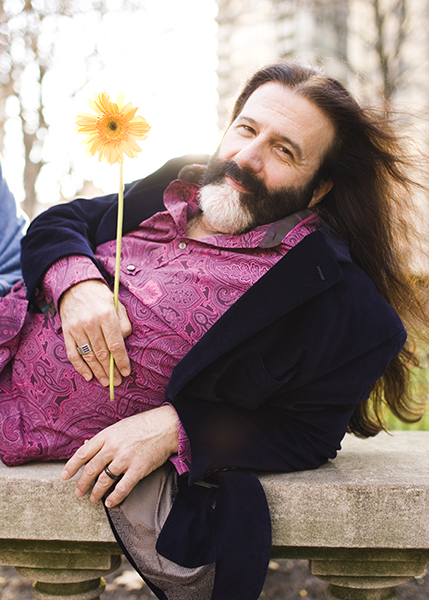
- Pierre Robert in 2007
- Born: William Pierre Robert; August 1, 1955; Truckee, California, U.S.
- Died: October 29, 2025 (aged 70); Gladwyne, Pennsylvania, U.S.
- Presenting career
- Show: The Pierre Robert Show
- Station: 93.3 WMMR in Philadelphia
- Time slot: Around 11:00am - 3:00pm Monday-Friday
- Style: Disc jockey, radio personality
- Country: United States
- Website: www.wmmr.com/shows/pierre-robert

William Pierre Robert (/ˈroʊˈbɛər/; August 1, 1955 – October 29, 2025) was an American radio disc jockey and on-air personality for WMMR in Philadelphia. He worked at the station for 44 years, from 1981 until his death in 2025.

Robert was a prominent on-air personality at WMMR. Local audiences sometimes characterized his appearance and demeanor as countercultural. During broadcasts, he commonly addressed listeners as "citizens" and frequently used the phrase "great day in the morning!" as a recurring expression.

Over the course of his career, Robert interviewed numerous figures in the American rock music industry. He was widely respected by rock musicians and bands, including Jon Bon Jovi, Dave Grohl, and Eddie Vedder. Several artists granted him infrequent interviews or made in-studio appearances on his program, reflecting his standing within the music community.

== Early life ==
Pierre Robert was born August 1, 1955, in Truckee, California. He grew up in a family that owned and operated motels. During his childhood and adolescence, he was exposed to West Coast rock music of the 1960s, which contributed to his interest in radio broadcasting.

== Career ==
Robert began his radio career as an intern and later an on-air host at 94.9 KSAN in San Francisco, one of the first progressive rock stations in the United States. In the early 1980s, KSAN changed its format to Urban Country and Western. During this period, Robert briefly used the on-air name "Will Robertson", reflecting his dissatisfaction with the new format.

Shortly thereafter, Robert traveled to Philadelphia, driving a 1970 Volkswagen van nicknamed Minerva. He submitted a demo tape to WMMR, but was initially not offered a position and instead worked at Essene, a health food store and vegetarian restaurant. According to later accounts, a palm reader on South Street predicted he would soon receive a letter. Upon returning home, Robert received a letter from Joe Bonadonna, then the station manager at WMMR, informing him of an opening. Robert joined WMMR in 1981.

Robert held several positions at WMMR, including broadcasting during morning, overnight, and midday shifts. His latest time slot was from 11 a.m. to 3 p.m., though his program occasionally started late or ran longer, an anomaly he referred to as "Pierre Standard Time."

Features of his show included the "Coffee Break Music Marathon", "Pierre's Planner", and the “Work Force Blocks”, during which he played three or four songs by a single artist based on listener requests. Robert also presented the "Vinyl Cut", a segment in which he played a track from one of the vinyl records in the WMMR archive.

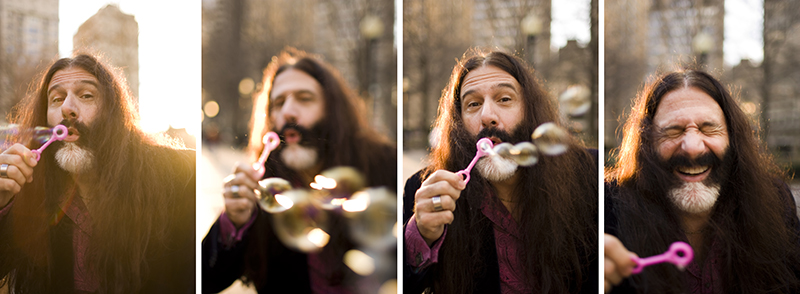
Pierre Robert in 2007

Robert regularly aired the full 18-minute version of Arlo Guthrie's "Alice's Restaurant" during his annual Thanksgiving broadcast.

He stated that he did not closely follow Philadelphia sports teams, despite the city’s strong sports culture. As part of an on-air running joke, he referred to all Philadelphia teams as "The Boys in Blue", regardless of their actual team colors, and frequently used the phrase "Sports Up!", most often during his overlap with the Preston and Steve show in the morning.

In January 2024, Robert signed a multi-year contract extension with WMMR.

== Death ==
Robert was found dead at his home in Gladwyne, Pennsylvania, on October 29, 2025, at the age of 70.

== Notable events ==
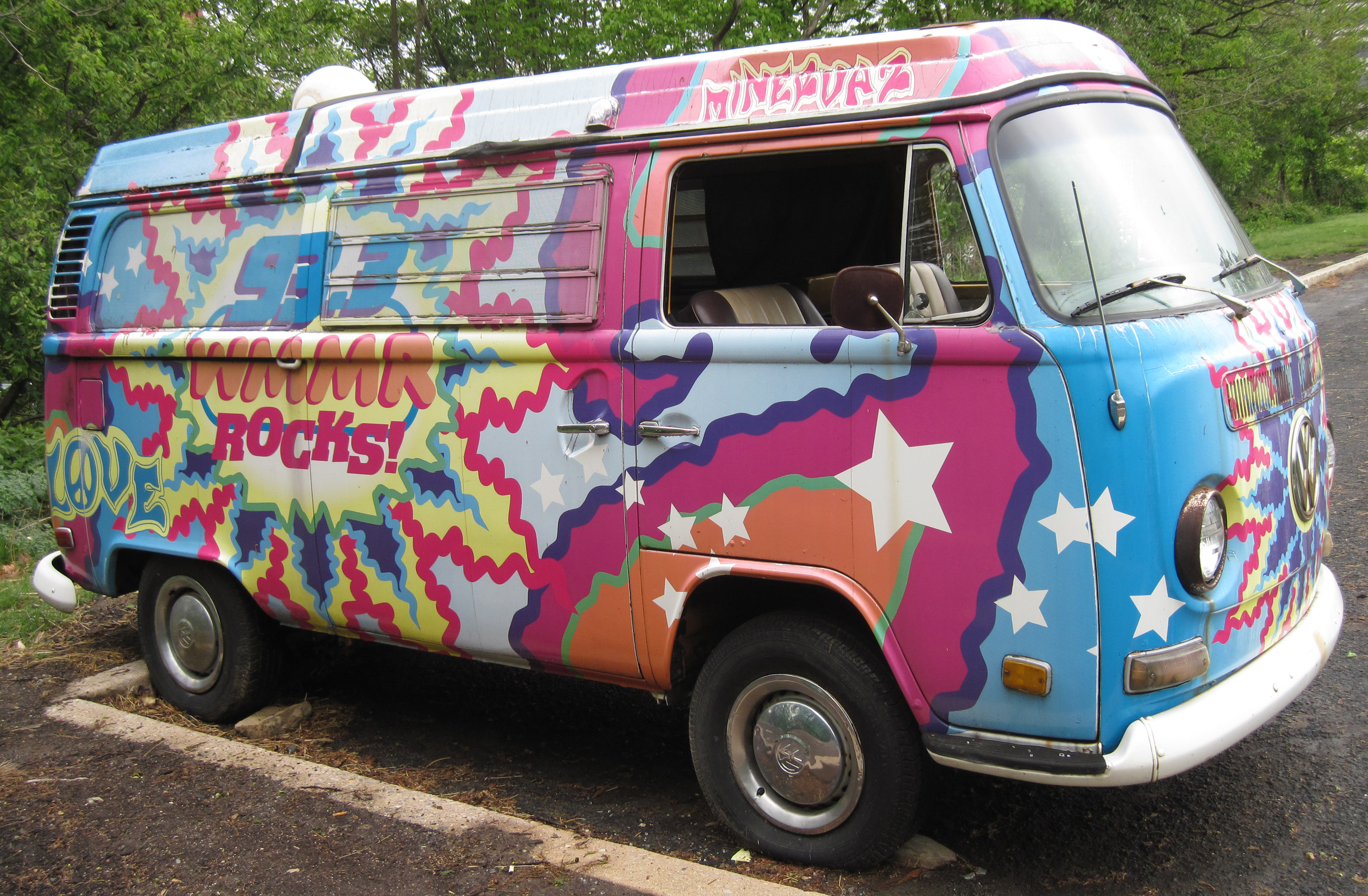
Robert's 1972 Volkswagen Type 2 Westfalia, nicknamed "Minerva 2"

- Robert's first VW micro-bus, named "Minerva", was impounded by the Philadelphia Parking Authority and later destroyed at a junkyard.
- He frequently said the phrase "God bless the Grateful Dead" on the air. On October 7, 1994, at the band’s concert at the Spectrum, Robert presented the Grateful Dead with a flag commemorating their 50th performance at the venue.
- In 2001, WMMR hosted an event at the Spectrum to mark Robert's 20th anniversary with the station, and presented him with a 1972 Volkswagen Type 2 Westfalia to replace his 1970 VW microbus. The vehicle was named "Minerva 2" in honor of the original Minerva, which Robert had driven from California to Philadelphia.
- In 2002, Robert drove "Minerva 2" during the WMMR Ozz-Fund, a four-day fundraiser event benefiting the Fox Chase Cancer Center in the name of Sharon Osbourne. He traveled throughout the Delaware Valley collecting donations from listeners and fans.
- Throughout the first 25 days of November 2006, WMMR paid tribute to Robert in recognition of his 25 years of service to the station.
- In November 2011, Bob Beru of Beru Revue performed at The World Cafe Live in honor of Robert's 30th year with WMMR.
- In September 2012, the owners of the building housing WMMR notified Robert that "Minerva 2" was at risk of being towed due to its deteriorating condition, which included flat tires, floorboard damage, and a broken window. Robert subsequently worked with CollisionMax to restore the vehicle. The restoration included custom airbrushing by Franny Drummond of PaintZoo. Weekly videos documenting the restoration were recorded by Rich Tornetta, CollisionMax’s director of marketing.
- In October 2019, Robert was inducted into the Philadelphia Music Walk of Fame along with The Hooters, a Philadelphia-based rock band.
- In 2021, to celebrate his 40th year with WMMR, the studio housing the station was renamed the "Pierre Robert Studio".
- On December 11, 2025, the Philadelphia City Council adopted a resolution to rename portions of Latimer Street between 12th and Camac Streets as Pierre Robert Way in his honor.
- On December 17, 2025, a tribute concert attended by thousands of fans was held at the Fillmore in Philadelphia.
