= WMMR =

Active rock radio station in Philadelphia

- Philadelphia, Pennsylvania; United States
- Broadcast area: Philadelphia metropolitan area
- Frequency: 93.3 MHz (HD Radio)
- Branding: 93.3 WMMR

Programming
- Language: English
- Format: Active rock
- Subchannels: HD2: "MMRchives" (live rock)
- Affiliations: United Stations Radio Networks; Philadelphia Flyers Radio Network

Ownership
- Owner: Beasley Broadcast Group; (Beasley Media Group Licenses, LLC)
- Sister stations: WBEN-FM; WMGK; WPEN; WTEL; WTMR; WWDB; WXTU

History
- First air date: April 20, 1942 (as W49PH)
- Former call signs: W47PH (1941); W49PH (1941–1943); WIP-FM (1943–1966)
- Former frequencies: 44.7 MHz (1941); 44.9 MHz (1941–1946); 97.5 MHz (1946–1948)
- Call sign meaning: Metromedia Radio

Technical information
- Licensing authority: FCC
- Facility ID: 25438
- Class: B
- ERP: 16,500 watts (analog); 165 watts (digital)
- HAAT: 264 meters (866 ft)
- Transmitter coordinates: 39°57′9.4″N 75°10′3.6″W

Links
- Public license information: Public file; LMS
- Webcast: Listen live; Listen live (via iHeartRadio)
- Website: wmmr.com

WMMR (93.3 FM, "93.3 WMMR") is a commercial radio station licensed to serve Philadelphia, Pennsylvania. The station is owned by the Beasley Broadcast Group through licensee Beasley Media Group, LLC and broadcasts an active rock radio format. The station's studios and offices are located in Bala Cynwyd and the transmitter is atop One Liberty Place at (39°57′9.4″N 75°10′3.6″W) in Center City Philadelphia.

WMMR broadcasts using HD Radio. Its HD2 subchannel plays live rock performances and sessions in WMMR's studios.

WMMR carries Philadelphia Flyers hockey games when its all-sports sister station 97.5 WPEN is airing another sporting event and cannot broadcast the Flyers game. WMMR is the home of Preston and Steve, heard weekday mornings.

In 2014, WMMR was inducted into the Rock and Roll Hall of Fame in its "Heritage Rock Stations" category.

== History ==
=== 1940s ===
On February 11, 1941, the Federal Communications Commission (FCC) granted Pennsylvania Broadcasting Company a construction permit for a new FM station on 44.7 MHz on the original 42-50 MHz FM broadcast band with the W47PH call sign. The construction permit was modified on November 4, 1941, when the FCC reallocated the station to 44.9 MHz with a corresponding call sign change to W49PH. The FCC also on this date granted the station authority for the first time to begin broadcasting. The station signed on for the first time on April 20, 1942, and was granted its first license on March 2, 1943. Programming was initially a simulcast of sister station WIP (610 AM).

On November 1, 1943, the station was assigned the WIP-FM call sign. After the FCC created the current FM broadcast band on June 27, 1945, Pennsylvania Broadcasting applied to the FCC for a construction permit on October 24, 1946, to install a new transmitter and antenna for operation on 97.5 MHz. On July 10, 1947, the FCC reallocated the station to 93.3 MHz, modifying the construction permit. The commission granted Pennsylvania Broadcasting a new license for the station for operation on 93.3 MHz on December 22, 1948.

=== 1950s and 1960s ===
In the 1950s and 1960s, WIP-FM carried a full service format of middle of the road (MOR) music, news, sports and talk. The station's license was voluntarily reassigned by the FCC to WIP Broadcasting, Inc. on September 17, 1958, followed by another voluntary reassignment to Metropolitan Broadcasting Corporation on December 29, 1959. The FCC granted a licensee name change from Metropolitan Broadcasting Corporation to Metromedia, Inc. on May 11, 1961. On August 6, 1962, Metromedia applied for a construction permit to relocate the station's transmitter and antenna in Philadelphia from 35 South 9th Street to 12 South 12th Street at the Loews Philadelphia Hotel. This resulted in raising the station's height above average terrain (HAAT) from 430 feet to 668 feet, while decreasing the station's effective radiated power (ERP) from 20,000 watts to 7,500 watts. The FCC granted Metromedia a new license for the station with the new facilities on September 30, 1963.

On July 1, 1966, the station's call sign was changed to WMMR. The call sign reflected the name of the station's owner, "Metromedia" (and "Radio"). From 1948 to 1993, WMMR was used unofficially as a slogan by a local student-run carrier current radio station at the University of Minnesota. The MOR format was still being used, but with different programming from the AM side, although the AM disc jockeys' announcements were used for both stations. Studios of WIP and WMMR were on 19th Street near Rittenhouse Square.

Beginning in 1968, WMMR began adopting a progressive rock format, similar to that of several Metromedia-owned stations including WNEW-FM in New York City. WNEW-FM and WMMR had a close relationship, ran similar promotions, and sometimes featured each other's disc jockeys on the air. WMMS in Cleveland, KMET in Los Angeles, and KSAN in San Francisco were also part of the Metromedia chain and also helped pioneer the progressive rock format in the 1960s.

Dave Herman was WMMR's first rock DJ. His show, dubbed The Marconi Experiment, debuted on April 29, 1968. Before Herman's arrival, WMMR ran an "MOR" format, including programs such as Sinatra and Company. The Marconi Experiment was very much an experiment for the station, with progressive rock still new to the FM band. The first song played on the show was "Flying" by The Beatles. Over the instrumental song, Herman recited these words: "Arise my heart, and fill your voice with music. For he who shares not dawn with his song, is one of the sons of ever darkness." This was known as "The Incantation" and continued as the regular show opening.

Several Philadelphia FM stations tried to compete with WMMR in the late 1960s, including WIFI and WDAS-FM. Neither station stayed with the rock format for long. In 1970, WIFI switched to a Top 40 format, while WDAS-FM changed format around 1971 to reflect its AM counterpart as an urban contemporary station.

=== 1970s ===
Michael Cuscuna from the University of Pennsylvania's WXPN replaced Herman in 1970, but was quickly hired away by WABC-FM (now WPLJ) in New York City. Michael Tearson, also from WXPN, replaced Cuscuna and remained a mainstay at WMMR for over 20 years. Herman went to WABC-FM and then for a couple of decades on WNEW-FM, and later on WXRK. Tearson later worked at WMGK in Philadelphia, from April 2002 until January 2013. He was also heard on Sirius XM's Deep Tracks channel.

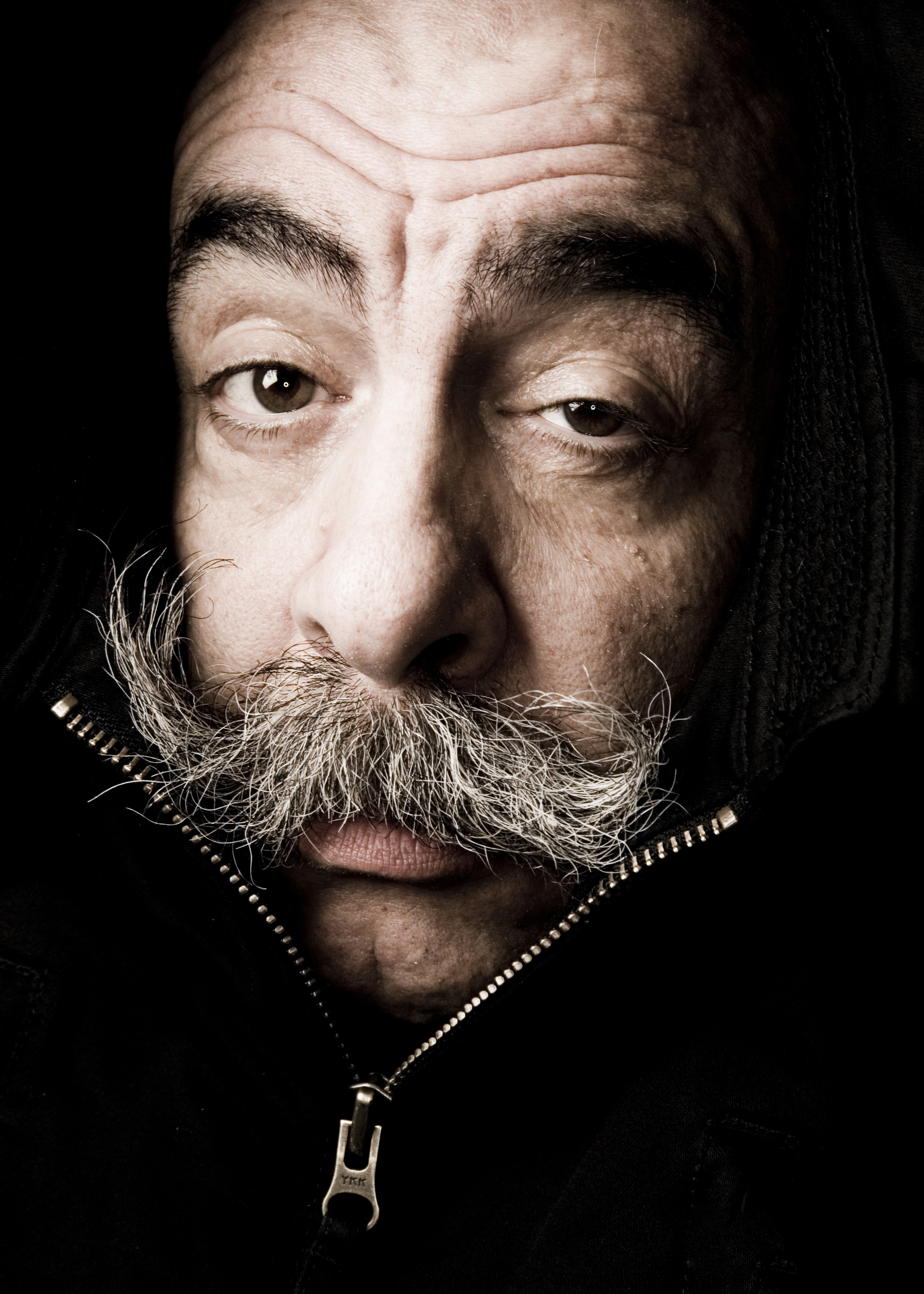
John DeBella in 2005

Later in the 1970s, two other Philadelphia radio stations became competitors: WYSP (formerly WIBG-FM) and WIOQ. WYSP later became a classic rock outlet while WIOQ became a Top 40 radio station.

One of WMMR's most influential disc jockeys during the 1970s was Ed Sciaky, who was known for playing and boosting the careers of new artists such as Billy Joel and Yes. Sciaky is credited with introducing Bruce Springsteen to Philadelphia, and decades later, the city remains one of Springsteen's strongest fan bases and the scenes of many of his best-received concerts. WMMR alumni include David Dye, founding host of the World Cafe on WXPN and syndicated on many NPR stations. Another former WMMR DJ is Nick Spitzer, now a New Orleans resident and host of "American Routes" on NPR. One-time WMMR midday DJ Dick Hungate later switched to WYSP, pioneering the classic rock format in Philadelphia. John DeBella was the morning drive time DJ for many years, alongside newscaster and sidekick Mark "The Shark" Drucker, who later was a reporter on all-news KYW. Some WMMR DJs such as Dave Herman and Carol Miller would later go onto longtime careers on New York stations.

=== 1980s ===
On July 17, 1980, Metromedia applied for a construction permit to increase the station's ERP to 29,000 watts. The FCC granted the permit on July 17, 1981, followed by a new license with the upgraded facilities on August 1, 1981.

WMMR's license was transferred to Metropolitan Broadcasting Corporation on October 22, 1986.

On October 26, 1987, Metropolitan Broadcasting applied for a construction permit to change the transmitter location to "Building Rooftop 1650 Market St., Philadelphia, PA" (the address of One Liberty Place) and increase the station's HAAT to 271 meters (889 ft). The FCC granted the permit on May 1, 1989. On October 26, 1989, WMMR was purchased by Group W Radio Acquisition Company, with the sale consummating on December 7, 1989, thus becoming a sister station to KYW-TV and KYW radio.

=== 1990s ===
Group W Radio modified the construction permit on February 12, 1992, by decreasing the HAAT to 252 meters (827 ft) and changing the ERP to 18,000 watts. The FCC granted the change on March 9, 1992. The FCC granted a new license with the new facilities on January 6, 1997.

Greater Los Angeles Radio, Inc., a division of Greater Media, purchased WMMR, with the sale consummating on August 22, 1997.

=== 2000s ===
In May 2005, the station began airing the Preston & Steve show in morning drive, which was previously heard on WPLY. In early 2006, WMMR launched its digital HD2 subchannel with the "WMMaRchives" format, airing the station's archive of live and studio performances.

=== 2010s ===
On July 19, 2016, Beasley Media Group announced it would acquire Greater Media and its 21 stations (including WMMR) for $240 million. The FCC approved the sale on October 6, and the sale closed on November 1.

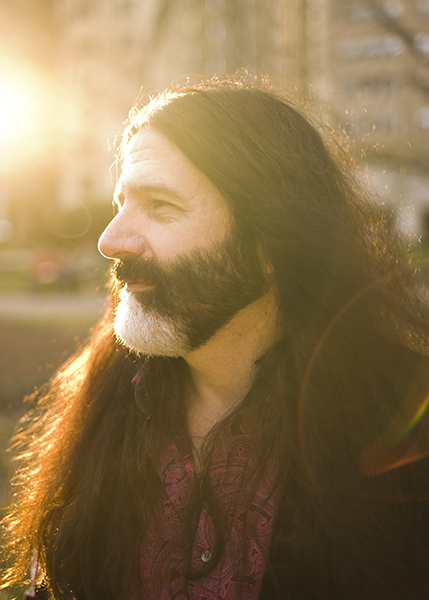
Pierre Robert in 2007

=== 2020s ===
In 2021, midday DJ Pierre Robert celebrated his 40th year on the air at WMMR. The Philadelphia City Council passed a resolution to declare November 24 as Pierre Robert Day.

For many years, WMMR prided itself on having live and local DJs 24/7/365, a rarity in modern radio. This run would end in October 2022, when owners Beasley Media made major cuts to the staff of WMMR and other stations, resulting in the elimination of the live overnight block. Among those laid off were 18-year WMMR afternoon host Paul Jaxon.

In May 2025, longtime morning co-host Kathy Romano was dismissed in a cost saving measure.

On October 29, 2025, midday host Robert was found dead at his home. He was 70 years old. On December 1, 2025, Matt Cord returned to WMMR as the new midday host. Cord had been hosting mornings at sister-station WMGK, with two previous stints on the WMMR staff.

== Awards ==
In 2007, WMMR was nominated for the Radio & Records magazine award for "Active Rock Station of the Year" in a top 25 market. Other nominees included WIYY in Baltimore, WAAF in Boston, KBPI in Denver, WRIF in Detroit, and KISW in Seattle.

In 2010, the station was honored by the National Association of Broadcasters with the Marconi Award for "Rock Station of the Year". WMMR has also been honored as the Major Market Radio Station of the Year by the rock community RadioContraband in both 2011 and 2012. In the late 1980s, WMMR was recognized as one of the best rock stations in America by Rolling Stone Magazine.

In 2014, WMMR was inducted into the Rock and Roll Hall of Fame in the "Heritage Rock Stations" category.
