= WTMR =

Religious radio station in Camden, New Jersey

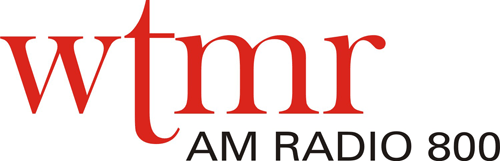
- Camden, New Jersey; United States
- Broadcast area: Philadelphia, Pennsylvania
- Frequency: 800 kHz
- Branding: WTMR AM Radio 800

Programming
- Format: Brokered and religious programming
- Affiliations: Westwood One

Ownership
- Owner: Beasley Broadcast Group, Inc.; (Beasley Media Group Licenses, LLC)
- Sister stations: WBEN-FM; WMGK; WMMR; WPEN; WTEL; WWDB; WXTU

History
- First air date: November 1, 1948
- Former call signs: WKDN (1948–1968)
- Call sign meaning: Thomas M. Roberts, owner of the station from 1968 on; backronymed slogan, "Where the Master Reigns"

Technical information
- Licensing authority: FCC
- Facility ID: 24658
- Class: B
- Power: 5,000 watts day; 500 watts night
- Transmitter coordinates: 39°54′33.41″N 75°5′58.63″W

Links
- Public license information: Public file; LMS
- Webcast: Listen live
- Website: wtmrradio.com

WTMR (800 AM) is a radio station broadcasting brokered programming, mainly religious programming. Licensed to Camden, New Jersey, United States, it serves the Philadelphia area. WTMR is owned by Beasley Broadcast Group, Inc., through licensee Beasley Media Group, LLC, and features programming from Westwood One. The transmitter site is in Camden, while studios and offices are located in the "555 Building" in Bala Cynwyd, Pennsylvania.

== History ==
The station began operations November 1, 1948, as WKDN. It was originally owned by Ranulf Compton, and was a 1,000-watt, daytime-only station that broadcast middle-of-the-road music. The call letters became WTMR after the station was sold separately from WKDN-FM in 1968. By the early 1970s, WTMR's power had been increased to 5,000 watts. In 1975, the station began phasing out pop music in favor of religious programming. It was granted a license to operate at night during the 1980s.
