= WMGK =

Classic rock radio station in Philadelphia

- Philadelphia, Pennsylvania; United States
- Broadcast area: Philadelphia metropolitan area
- Frequency: 102.9 MHz (HD Radio)
- Branding: 102.9 MGK

Programming
- Format: Classic rock
- Subchannels: HD2: Oldies 102.9 HD2 (oldies); HD3: Playa 102.9 HD3 (Salsa)

Ownership
- Owner: Beasley Broadcast Group; (Beasley Media Group Licenses, LLC)
- Sister stations: WBEN-FM; WMMR; WPEN; WTEL; WTMR; WWDB; WXTU

History
- First air date: 1941
- Former call signs: W67PH (1940–1941); W69PH (1941–1943); WCAU-FM (1943–1947); WPEN-FM (1947–1975)
- Former frequencies: 46.7 MHz (1940–1941) (CP); 46.9 MHz (1941–1945); 102.7 MHz (1945–1950)
- Call sign meaning: "Magic" (Magic was the name of a former adult contemporary format)

Technical information
- Licensing authority: FCC
- Facility ID: 25094
- Class: B
- ERP: 8,900 watts (analog); 155 watts (digital)
- HAAT: 350 meters (1,150 ft)
- Transmitter coordinates: 40°2′21.4″N 75°14′11.6″W

Links
- Public license information: Public file; LMS
- Webcast: Listen live (via iHeartRadio)
- Website: wmgk.com

WMGK (102.9 FM, "102.9 MGK") is a commercial FM radio station licensed to serve Philadelphia, Pennsylvania. The station is owned by Beasley Broadcast Group and broadcasts a classic rock radio format. The station's studios are in Bala Cynwyd and broadcast tower used by the station is located in the Roxborough section of Philadelphia. The station features Philadelphia radio personalities Paul Kelly (AMD), Kristen Herrmann (Middays), Tony Harris (PMD). Only Paul Kelly broadcasts his show live, while Kristen and Tony pre-record, or "voice track" their shows in advance, a continuing trend in the radio business. Tony also serves as Operations Director, Music Director and Commercial Production Director. Weekends and Fill-ins are rounded out with Angel Donato, Cyndy Drue, Jay Gleason, Danny Ocean, T. Morgan, Jen Scordo and Sean Burke.

== History ==
=== Early years ===
On November 26, 1940, the Federal Communications Commission granted WCAU Broadcasting Company a construction permit for a new FM station on 46.7 MHz on the original 42–50 MHz FM broadcast band with the W67PH call sign. The construction permit was modified on January 28, 1941, when the FCC reallocated the station to 46.9 MHz with a corresponding call sign change to W69PH.

On November 24, 1941, the FCC granted the station authority to begin broadcasting and granted its first license on November 18, 1942.

On November 1, 1943, the station was assigned the WCAU-FM call sign. After the FCC created the current FM broadcast band on June 27, 1945, the commission granted WCAU Broadcasting the authority to begin operating the station on 102.7 MHz on December 17, 1945.

The FCC granted a voluntarily reassignment of the station's license to Philadelphia Record Company on October 17, 1946. On June 27, 1947, the FCC reallocated the station to 102.9 MHz, followed by another voluntary reassignment of the station's license on November 28, 1947, to William Penn Broadcasting Company. This reassignment was effective on December 18, 1947, at which time the station's call sign was changed to WPEN-FM. The new owners filed an application for a construction permit to move the station to 102.9 MHz on July 12, 1948. A new license for operation on the new frequency was granted by the FCC on August 17, 1950.

WPEN-FM was one of the first two FM stations to be licensed for SCA (subcarrier) service. The station filed an application for the SCA on October 12, 1955, with the FCC granting the authorization on July 1, 1956. Subcarriers could be used to send special programming to subscribers, such as background music for stores and restaurants.

From its founding until the 1960s, WPEN-FM mostly simulcast 950 WPEN. In 1966, when the FCC no longer allowed most FM stations to simulcast their AM counterparts full-time, WPEN-FM carried a middle-of-the-road format, similar to the AM station, but with fewer interruptions and with mostly pre-recorded DJ comments. Some hours were still simulcast.

=== Switch to soft rock ===
First logo for WMGK

On October 16, 1974, the station's license was voluntarily transferred by the FCC to Greater Philadelphia Radio, Inc., a subsidiary of Greater Media, with an effective date of January 6, 1975. On September 2, 1975, the station's call sign was changed to WMGK. The station adopted a soft rock format and changed its slogan to "Magic Music" with the Magic 103 branding. The first song aired under the new call sign was "Could It Be Magic" by Barry Manilow. The music on Magic 103 was mostly album cuts from singer-songwriters of the 1960s and early 1970s, presented in four-song blocks with minimal talk. The station did not play artists primarily found on the Top 40, such as The Carpenters or Anne Murray. The playlist was made up of softer songs heard on album rock stations, from artists such as Elton John, Carole King, Billy Joel, and Carly Simon. The format was quite successful, with Greater Media putting "Magic Music" on its other FM stations, along with call letters referring to "Magic", WMJC in Detroit, WMJX in Boston and WMGQ in New Brunswick, New Jersey.

On December 22, 1976, the FCC granted Greater Philadelphia Radio, Inc. a construction permit to relocate the station's transmitter and antenna to the Roxborough section of Philadelphia. The station's license was renewed by the FCC with the new facilities on July 12, 1978.

Over time, WMGK began to lose listeners to WUSL, known as "US 1". WUSL had switched from easy listening to a soft vocal format similar to WMGK, but with a shorter playlist of more familiar songs. Eventually, WMGK responded with an even tighter playlist, moving from soft rock to a soft adult contemporary format and rebounded past WUSL in the ratings. The station was programmed by the late Dave Klahr and signed on by its first midday host Pete Booker, who later programmed Greater Media sister station WMJC in Detroit, and who recently retired as CEO of the Delmarva Broadcasting Company.

=== Move to adult contemporary ===
In the mid 1980s, Magic 103 leaned soft, but played several uptempo songs an hour, along with more current product. In the spring of 1986, WMGK started a contemporary jazz show called Sunday Morning Jazz, later renamed Sunday Evening Jazz in early 1987. The show was hosted by WMGK's then Program Director, Bob Craig and ended in October 1988 when Craig left the radio station. Craig returned in the spring of 1990, and again hosted a contemporary jazz show, this one running on both Saturday and Sunday nights from 7 p.m. to midnight. Along with the jazz, some soft rock songs were mixed in as well. The show lasted one year and ended in the early summer of 1991. Eventually, Philadelphia obtained its first full-time smooth jazz station in 1993, 106.1 WJJZ, which made its debut two years after WMGK's contemporary jazz show had ended.

WUSL, the chief rival to WMGK, switched to country music in 1981. In 1989, WEAZ, an easy listening outlet known as "Easy 101", made the transition to soft AC, and in 1993, changed its call sign to WBEB, calling itself "B-101". Easy 101 had a large number of listeners, and most of them stayed with the station when it became B-101, causing WMGK to slip in the ratings. In addition, WSNI was also playing adult contemporary music, giving Philadelphia three stations in the AC format.

=== All-1970s hits ===
On July 11, 1994, WMGK dropped the long time AC format and changed it to an all-1970s format. The 1970s hits included classic rock, soft rock, disco and R&B. By 1995, the station added a few big 1960s and 1980s hits, and no longer used the term "Magic". By the Fall of 1995, WMGK played mostly classic rock with some rock-friendly classic hits thrown in, but not much of the harder material.

=== Classic rock ===
In 1997, Greater Media acquired two more Philadelphia FM stations, album rock WMMR and modern AC WXXM. WMGK continued to position itself as a Classic Hits station. But in April, 2002, WMGK began as Philadelphia's Classic Rock and eliminated non-rock songs altogether. The original Classic Rock lineup was John DeBella (mornings), Debbi Calton (middays), Andre Gardner (afternoons), and Ray Koob (nights).

On November 17, 2006, at 6 p.m., former New Jersey–based classic rock station WTHK became "The New Smooth Jazz 97.5 WJJZ". With WTHK no longer airing classic rock, WMGK became the Philadelphia region's only classic rock station. The station on 97.5 is now co-owned with WMGK and carries a sports radio format as WPEN-FM, which was once WMGK's call sign.

On April Fools' Day in 2015, WMGK briefly reverted to its previous adult contemporary/soft rock music format during DJ Andre Gardner program. Gardner announced that "Magic 103" was back and played the old Magic jingles, plus some of the songs of the "Magic" era. The prank ended after about 20 minutes, with Gardner saying, "did you really think we'd change from Classic Rock? April Fool!" before launcing into The Who's "Won't Get Fooled Again."

On July 19, 2016, Beasley Media Group announced it would acquire Greater Media and its 21 stations (including WMGK) for $240 million. The FCC approved the sale on October 6, and the sale closed on November 1.

In recent years, WMGK has experienced on air changes, including the retirement of midday host Debbi Calton in 2019 and morning show host John DeBella in 2023. As owner Beasley Media continued to experience financial difficulties, the station lost several DJs in cost-cutting layoffs, including night DJ Ray Koob in May, 2018 and afternoon DJ Andre Gardner in October, 2024. Morning host Matt Cord left WMGK to return to middays at sister-station WMMR in December 2025, following the death of Pierre Robert. Cord was replaced in mornings at WMGK by Paul Kelly.

=== Competition ===
WMGK had three major competitors in Philadelphia. On August 25, 2008, WYSP switched from active rock to classic rock, with a harder sound than that of WMGK. On September 2, 2011, WYSP switched to Sports Radio as WIP-FM. WFKB 107.5 Frank FM, licensed to serve Boyertown, Pennsylvania, competed with WMGK in Philadelphia's northern and western suburbs and in the Lehigh Valley. On March 30, 2009, WFKB switched to Christian programming and became WBYN-FM. Currently, listeners in the northern suburbs of Philadelphia can receive WODE-FM 99.9 The Hawk, licensed to serve Easton, Pennsylvania, and primarily focused on the Lehigh Valley.

== HD Radio ==
In early 2006, WMGK launched a digital HD2 subchannel with its "WMGK Deep Trax" format featuring classic rock nuggets and 'oh wow' songs that may be a bit outside the radio norm. The format has since been switched to oldies primarily of the 60's & early 70's.

== Signal note ==
WMGK is short-spaced to two other Class B stations:

WNEW-FM NEW 102.7 (licensed to serve New York City) and WQSR 102.7 Jack FM (licensed to serve Baltimore, Maryland) both operate on 102.7 MHz, a first adjacent channel to WMGK. The distance between WMGK's transmitter and WNEW-FM's transmitter is 82 miles, while the distance between WMGK's transmitter and WQSR's transmitter is 92 miles, as determined by FCC rules. The minimum distance between two Class B stations operating on first adjacent channels according to current FCC rules is 105 miles.
