= WXTU =

Country music radio station in Philadelphia

- Philadelphia, Pennsylvania; United States
- Broadcast area: Philadelphia metropolitan area
- Frequency: 92.5 MHz (HD Radio)
- Branding: 92-5 XTU

Programming
- Language: English
- Format: Country music
- Subchannels: HD2: Country "NuTune Country"; HD3: Sports/music "Flyers Radio 24/7"

Ownership
- Owner: Beasley Broadcast Group; (Beasley Media Group Licenses, LLC)
- Sister stations: WBEN-FM; WMGK; WMMR; WPEN; WTEL; WTMR; WWDB

History
- First air date: September 1958
- Former call signs: WIFI (1958–1983)
- Call sign meaning: Visually similar to calls of New York station WKTU, which it attempted to emulate for a short time

Technical information
- Facility ID: 74213
- Class: B
- ERP: 15,000 watts
- HAAT: 279 meters (915 ft)
- Transmitter coordinates: 40°02′21″N 75°14′13″W

Links
- Webcast: HD3: Listen live
- Website: 925xtu.com

WXTU (92.5 FM) is a commercial radio station in Philadelphia, Pennsylvania. Owned by Beasley Broadcast Group, the station broadcasts a country music format. Its studios and offices are located at 1 Bala Plaza on East City Avenue in Bala Cynwyd, Pennsylvania, while its transmitter is located in the Roxborough section of the city.

WXTU broadcasts in HD; its HD2 sub-channel airs a contemporary country format known as "NuTune Country".

== History ==
=== Early years ===
The first Philadelphia FM station on 92.5 was Westinghouse-owned KYW-FM, the sister station to KYW. In 1942, Westinghouse put the station on the air in the old FM band and in 1948 moved it to 92.5 MHz. The development of FM radio in the post-war years was slow and Westinghouse decided not to continue operating KYW-FM, relinquishing its license in 1955. The 92.5 frequency stayed empty for three years.

In September 1958, WIFI signed on at 92.5 MHz, owned by Hi-Fidelity Broadcasters Corporation. Although it was always licensed as a Philadelphia station, WIFI in its early years was essentially a local station serving Norristown, Pennsylvania, and neighboring communities in Montgomery County. It aired middle of the road music and talk along with some specialty music shows and local high school sports. At the end of the 1960s, WIFI brought some of the first "progressive rock" or "underground" programming to the airwaves with Johnny Devereaux and other hosts. By 1970, WIFI had been acquired by General Cinema Corporation and had dropped local programming, replacing it with a syndicated music service known as "Hit Parade", playing automated adult contemporary music and pre-recorded announcements, with no live disc jockeys needed. WIFI later switched to Hit Parade's companion oldies format, known as "Solid Gold Rock and Roll", and also tried other automated programming.

=== Top 40 and alternative rock years ===
On January 1, 1973, WIFI instituted a high-energy contemporary hit radio format known as the Boogie Format with the slogan "Let's Boogie". It was one of the first stand-alone, live FM top 40 stations in the United States. John Tenaglia served as Vice President of General Cinema Corp., George Burns as consultant and Steve "Shotgun" Kelly as Program Director. The legendary Hy Lit from WIBG was brought on board as the morning drive time personality along with Bill Figenshu (Wild Bill Elliot) middays, Steve "Shotgun" Kelly in afternoon drive, Fritz Coleman (Bobby Walker) and John Rivers nights. The Boogie Bug was created from a Volkswagen Bug and then the VW Thing was added along with Boogie book covers for school books and "Let's Boogie" billboards all over town. Later well-known personalities were Byron and Tanaka, Jeff "Mutha" Robbins, Bill Gamble, and Pat McKay. WIFI was the only true top 40 station in Philadelphia following WFIL's evolution into an adult Contemporary format in the late 1970s.

When WCAU-FM (now WOGL) debuted its Hot Hits format on September 24, 1981, WIFI's ratings fell as WCAU-FM quickly grabbed most of the teen audience. In March 1983, a move to a new wave/alternative rock format, branded as "I-92" and "Rock of the Eighties", attracted press attention, but ratings fell to a 0.5 share in the Arbitron Spring 1983 Book.

=== Switch to WXTU ===
In August 1983, the station was sold to Beasley Broadcast Group. The new owners instituted a dance music/rhythmic contemporary format as "92X", with a call sign change to WXTU on September 19, (reminiscent of New York City's WKTU). That format failed to find an audience and was gone in a matter of months. On March 1, 1984, at 1 p.m., the station switched to its current country format. The first country song on WXTU was "Are You Ready For The Country" by Waylon Jennings.

In 2007, the station was nominated for the Radio & Records Magazine "Country Music Station of The Year Award" for the top 25 markets. Other nominees included WUSN in Chicago, KYGO-FM in Denver, WYCD in Detroit, KEEY-FM in Minneapolis, and KSON-FM in San Diego.

=== Changes in ownership ===
On October 2, 2014, Beasley Broadcast Group announced that it would trade WXTU and four other radio stations in Miami and Philadelphia to CBS Radio in exchange for 14 CBS stations located in Tampa and Charlotte, with one station in Philadelphia, AM 610 (now WTEL), going to Beasley. (AM 610 was traded because keeping it would have put CBS over the FCC limit for stations in one media market). The swap was completed on December 1.

On February 2, 2017, CBS Radio announced it would merge with Entercom. The merger was approved on November 9, and was consummated on the 17th.

On July 19, 2018, Entercom announced that it would sell WXTU back to Beasley for $38 million as part of its purchase of WBEB. The sale closed on September 28.

=== Morning Show Syndication ===
In 2024, WXTU's long-running morning program, The Andie Summers Show, began airing in syndication on other Beasley-owned country stations: WKLB-FM in Boston and KCYE in Las Vegas. KCYE later returned to a local morning show. The show continues to air on WKLB.

== Awards and nominations ==
CMA Awards

- 2002 Radio Station (Major Market) (Nominated)
- 2005 Radio Station (Major Market) (Nominated)
- 2006 Radio Station (Major Market) (Nominated)
- 2007 Radio Station (Major Market) (Nominated)
- 2008 Radio Station (Major Market) (Nominated)
- 2013 Radio Station (Major Market) (Nominated)
- 2013 Broadcast Personality of the Year "Doc and Andie Show" (Major Market) (Won)
- 2014 Broadcast Personality of the Year "Razz on the Radio" (Major Market) (Nominated)
- 2020 Radio Station (Major Market) (Nominated)
- 2026 Major Market Personality of the Year (The Andie Summers Show)

ACM Awards

- 2007 Radio Station (Major Market) (Nominated)
- 2008 Radio Station (Major Market) (Nominated)
- 2012 Radio Station (Major Market) (Nominated)
- 2014 Radio Station (Major Market) (Won) (Tied with KUPL/Portland)
- 2015 On-Air Personality of the Year - Major Market (Nominated)

Industry Achievement Awards

- 2007 Radio Station (Major Market) (Nominated)
- 2007 Personality (Bob Marly) (Nominated)
- 2017 Country Music Station of the Year (Won)
