= WCAU (disambiguation) =

WCAU may refer to:

- WCAU, a television station in Philadelphia, Pennsylvania.
- WPHT, a radio station broadcasting at 1210 kHz on the AM band in Philadelphia, previous call was WCAU
- WOGL, a radio station broadcasting at 98.1 MHz on the FM band in Philadelphia, previous call was WCAU-FM
