= Inquirer News Tonight =

American TV newscast, 1994–1996

- Genre: News program
- Directed by: Dick Moore (1994); Mike Adams (1995–1996)
- Presented by: Weekdays: Jim Watkins, Victoria Hong (1994–1995); Steve Highsmith, Victoria Hong (1995); Steve Highsmith, Toni Yates (1995–1996)
- Country of origin: United States
- Original language: English
- No. of seasons: 2
- No. of episodes: 825

Production
- Executive producer: Bill Knoedelseder (1994–1996)
- Production location: Philadelphia
- Camera setup: Multi-camera
- Running time: 60 minutes (1994–1996); 30 minutes (June–December 1996)
- Production company: KR Video

Original release
- Network: WPHL-TV
- Release: September 24, 1994 – December 29, 1996

Related
- The Philadelphia Inquirer

Inquirer News Tonight is an American local television newscast for the Philadelphia area that aired from September 26, 1994, to December 29, 1996. Produced by KR Video—a subsidiary of Knight-Ridder, publisher of The Philadelphia Inquirer—in association with local TV station WPHL-TV, Inquirer News Tonight intended to combine the journalism resources of The Inquirer with a television news format. The program suffered from substantial internal turmoil—including an eight-month boycott by newspaper staffers—as well as KR Video's inexperience at translating the newspaper into a TV newscast; its ratings were low, and its revenues were well below projections. The partnership was dissolved at the end of 1996, and WPHL-TV retained the on-air personnel and continued producing local newscasts through 2005.

== Conception and launch ==
On January 10, 1994, P. Anthony Ridder announced the formation of KR Video and its intent to launch what was at the time known as The Inquirer News Hour to air on WPHL-TV (channel 17), owned by Tribune Broadcasting. The announcement came at a time when some newspapers were analyzing new possibilities in the production of television news: the Chicago Tribune had launched Chicagoland Television, a cable news channel in Chicago, and The Orange County Register in California also was tied to such a venture. The Inquirer News Hour was considered a pilot that Knight-Ridder hoped to expand in some form to its other newspapers and a way to gain experience in video news, with which Knight-Ridder had no experience after a prior sale of its TV stations. Management also saw it as a promotional tool for the newspaper.

Of a planned dedicated staff of 50 people, nine had been hired by the end of June. These included KR Video general manager Dick Moore, who had been a news director at WSB-TV in Atlanta and WSOC-TV in Charlotte, North Carolina. In addition, the program intended to use Inquirer journalists, crediting their stories and in some cases interviewing them. A storage area at WPHL-TV's studio was converted into a newsroom, while Tribune-owned WGNX in Atlanta shipped its old news set to Philadelphia for modification and reuse; Moore bought a double-wide trailer to provide more office space. The original title of The Inquirer News Hour tested poorly in focus groups, and by the end of July, it had changed to Inquirer News Tonight.

After two two-week delays, Inquirer News Tonight made its first broadcast on September 26, 1994, promising viewers "tomorrow's news now". Its lead anchors came from other cities: Jim Watkins had last worked in Cincinnati, and Victoria Hong came from Buffalo. The hour-long newscast presented difficulties from the outset. The Inquirer's television critic, Jonathan Storm, expressed concern over the incompatibility of the two media partners and found wild variance in the quality and texture of stories prepared by the TV staff, stories delivered by the not-camera-trained newspaper staff, and "often disastrous" mixes that failed to adequately translate the newspaper writing for television. This confusion persisted: Inquirer writer Michael L. Rozansky later said that Inquirer News Tonight "did not distinguish itself as an exciting new form of newscast—an expectation Knight-Ridder set".

== Personnel turnover and Inquirer staffer boycott ==
Personnel problems manifested before 1994 concluded. Weekend sportscaster Neil Hartman, a former play-by-play announcer for WPHL-TV, faced an objection by Moore when he signed a one-year deal to host a radio talk show on WGMP, over Moore's desire for him to be full-time on TV, and was replaced at the end of the year. A larger issue manifested in December. When Inquirer News Tonight started, the Newspaper Guild—representing 300 staff at The Inquirer—urged a 60-day cooperation period with the new venture. Soon after, talks stalled, and the Newspaper Guild urged its members to cease participation or furnishing information on sources, believing that the newspaper should compensate newspaper staffers for the additional work. As a result, for eight months, only a handful of newspaper employees appeared on Inquirer News Tonight; during this time, the newspapers launched a website, and a jurisdictional contract for that service became a higher priority for the Newspaper Guild. WTXF-TV (channel 29) news director Roger LeMay, whose 10 p.m. newscast was Inquirer News Tonight's competition, believed the boycott ultimately doomed the venture. After the boycott ended, several Inquirer columnists, including the automobile editor and restaurant critic, were regularly featured. Even then, editors were concerned that Inquirer News Tonight was scooping The Inquirer on stories and sometimes withheld information from the TV newsroom. Former Inquirer journalist Mark Bowden opined in a 2006 retrospective on the newscast that its format, originally designed for longer and more in-depth stories, became too similar to existing television newscasts. As a result, according to journalism instructor Phyllis Kaniss, the newscast became "pallid" and failed to give viewers a reason to watch.

At the end of 1994, Moore departed for WCPX-TV in Orlando, Florida, and was not replaced until Mike Adams was hired in May. Lead anchor Watkins departed in August 1995 for a job at WNBC in New York City and was replaced by Steve Highsmith, previously the weekend anchor; Hong left to return to Buffalo two months later and was replaced by weekend reporter–anchor Toni Yates. Weekend weatherman Bill Elias was suspended and later fired after it emerged that he had been fired from his previous job at WTXF for providing news tape of mobster Michael Ciancaglini's funeral to a bodyguard for rival John Stanfa, whose group used it to identify targets for a mob hit. Despite turnover, ratings and ad sales for Inquirer News Tonight improved during 1995. WPHL-TV had the rights to Philadelphia Phillies baseball and Philadelphia Flyers hockey, and when the newscast debuted, both teams were not playing owing to strike action; the Phillies not playing in particular was later cited by Claude Brodesser of Mediaweek as a contributor to the newscast's failure. The Flyers made the playoffs in the 1994–95 NHL season, and the Phillies held the best record in the National League through June, providing a strong lead-in for Inquirer News Tonight and raising its ratings averages. The format was tweaked, with a higher story count and more graphics. Despite these increases, Inquirer News Tonight continued to draw less than half as many viewers as its competition, the 10 p.m. newscast on WTXF; the decision to produce Inquirer News Tonight for broadcast TV and not cable tied the venture's viability not to a cable subscriber base but to more volatile ratings.

== Relaunch as a 30-minute program and cancellation ==
By early 1996, KR Video and WPHL-TV were in negotiations to renew the production contract for Inquirer News Tonight. KR Video sought to cut its costs, as it was paying an estimated $1.9 million a year for airtime on the station but not recouping its investment in advertising sales, and proposed cutting the newscast from an hour to a half-hour. The contract was renewed with the program cut to a half-hour beginning June 26, 1996; this was seen to negatively impact the original vision for a quality, newspaper-like newscast product.

It was as far removed from a success as anything I've ever been involved with.

— Gary Farrugia, executive editor, Inquirer News Tonight

In December 1996, rumors began circulating that Knight-Ridder would exit the venture. On December 16, the arrangement was announced to end, with WPHL-TV retaining three-fourths of the staff to continue to produce a 10 p.m. newscast minus integration with The Inquirer. Newspaper management noted that they had underestimated production costs; industry sources estimated Knight-Ridder lost $10 million on the venture, Moore noted the lack of a sound business plan, and founding executive producer Bill Knoedelseder said, "My opinion is that Knight-Ridder tried to play in a thousand-dollar poker game with a hundred dollars. They could just barely cover the ante." Other analysts noted the ratings, which were low against WTXF and even in comparison to the sitcoms WPHL-TV had been airing at 10 p.m. in 1993. The last edition of Inquirer News Tonight aired on December 29, 1996; the next day, WPHL-TV assumed full control of the news department and began airing the WB 17 News at Ten in its stead. The station continued to maintain an in-house news department until 2005, when it outsourced its 10 p.m. newscast to NBC-owned WCAU.
