= WPHL-TV =

Television station in Philadelphia

- Philadelphia, Pennsylvania; United States
- Channels: Digital: 17 (UHF), shared with WUVP-DT; Virtual: 17
- Branding: PHL17, PHL17 CW

Programming
- Affiliations: 17.1: The CW; 17.2: Antenna TV/MyNetworkTV; for others, see § Subchannels

Ownership
- Owner: Nexstar Media Group; (Tribune Media Company)

History
- First air date: July 17, 1960
- Former call signs: WKDN-TV (CP, 1954–1959); WPCA-TV (1959–1962)
- Former channel numbers: Analog: 17 (UHF, 1960–2009); Digital: 54 (UHF, 2002–2009)
- Former affiliations: Independent (1960–1962, 1965–1995); Dark (1962–1965); United (1967); The WB (1995–2006); MyNetworkTV (2006–2023, now on 17.2)
- Call sign meaning: Philadelphia; also IATA code for Philadelphia International Airport

Technical information
- Licensing authority: FCC
- Facility ID: 73879
- ERP: 645 kW; 1,000 kW (CP)
- HAAT: 324 m (1,063 ft); 321 m (1,053 ft) (CP)
- Transmitter coordinates: 40°2′30.9″N 75°14′21.9″W

Links
- Public license information: Public file; LMS
- Website: phl17.com

WPHL-TV (channel 17), branded as PHL17, is a television station in Philadelphia, Pennsylvania, United States, serving as the local outlet for The CW. The station also maintains a secondary affiliation with MyNetworkTV. Owned and operated by Nexstar Media Group, WPHL-TV maintains studios in the Wynnefield section of West Philadelphia and broadcasts itself and WUVP-DT (channel 65), the area's Univision station, from a tower in the antenna farm at Roxborough.

The first incarnation of channel 17 was a low-profile religious station, WPCA-TV, which started broadcasting July 17, 1960. It was founded by Percy Crawford's Young People's Church of the Air. Crawford died months after starting the station, and it went off the air August 1, 1962. It was purchased by a group led by Aaron Katz and relaunched as WPHL-TV on September 12, 1965. WPHL-TV was one of three independent stations, all on the ultra high frequency (UHF) band, to start in Philadelphia that year, competing with channel 29 (now WTXF-TV) and the original channel 48 (WKBS-TV). The station was merged into the U.S. Communications group, owned by American Viscose Corporation, in 1967 alongside construction permits held by Daniel H. Overmyer; WPHL-TV was the most successful station in the group and the only one not threatened with closure. Channel 17 was a sports broadcaster from the start, airing Philadelphia 76ers basketball from 1965 to 1972 and Philadelphia Phillies baseball from 1971 to 1982.

The Providence Journal Company acquired WPHL-TV in 1978. During its ownership, channel 17 lost the Phillies after Taft Broadcasting, then-owner of channel 29, acquired the team, but it strengthened its competitive position by buying most of WKBS-TV's programming inventory when it liquidated in 1983. A new Taft Broadcasting, formed after the Taft family sold the earlier company and its stations, acquired the station at the end of 1987, with most of channel 29's executives defecting to channel 17. The station became more competitive, but the new Taft Broadcasting was burdened by debt from a leveraged buyout and sold WPHL-TV to Tribune Broadcasting in 1992. In Tribune's first three years of ownership, channel 17 became the home of Phillies baseball once again; affiliated with The WB; and launched its first local newscast, a joint venture with The Philadelphia Inquirer known as Inquirer News Tonight that lasted two years. When the partnership was dissolved at the end of 1996, WPHL took newscast production in-house, but it struggled to find a substantial audience, with Tribune outsourcing news production to WCAU (channel 10) in 2005.

When The WB and UPN merged to form The CW in 2006, WPHL-TV was excluded from the new network and instead affiliated with MyNetworkTV. In 2012, the station switched news providers from WCAU to WPVI-TV (channel 6), and in 2015, it began producing an in-house morning newscast. Nexstar acquired Tribune in 2019 and, after purchasing The CW in 2022, moved its Philadelphia affiliation to WPHL-TV in 2023.

== Early history ==
=== WPCA-TV: Religious programming ===
Radio station WKDN of Camden, New Jersey, received a construction permit for ultra high frequency (UHF) channel 17 as WKDN-TV on January 27, 1954. After not building the facility, the station sold the permit to the Young People's Church of the Air, owned by Percy Crawford, for $40,000 in February 1959. The call letters were changed to WPCA-TV, reflecting both his initials and the name of his long-running broadcast ministry; the city of license was changed from Camden to Philadelphia in March 1960.

Promising a lineup of religious programs and family entertainment, the station signed on July 17, 1960, as the second local UHF station after educational WHYY-TV (channel 35). Crawford died October 31, 1960, after suffering a heart attack while driving. The station went dark August 1, 1962, having operated for two years.

=== WPHL-TV: Independent station relaunch ===
When channel 17 went dark, its sale was immediately announced to a consortium headed by attorney Aaron Jerome Katz and two real estate men. The station returned to the air on January 31, only to go dark again on June 14, when an application for the sale of channel 17 was finally filed with the Federal Communications Commission (FCC). The station's cameras were lent to WHYY-TV, the new public television station in Wilmington, Delaware, to allow that station to operate before a scheduled donation of equipment could be transferred and the station's own equipment did not function properly.

The Philadelphia Television Broadcasting Company, headed by Katz and advertising executive Len Stevens, was approved to purchase the station in mid-1964. After receiving approval to boost its effective radiated power from 12,000 to 626,000 watts, the new owners returned channel 17 to the air on September 17, 1965, as independent station WPHL-TV. Among its leading local programs were a weekly teen dance show, a children's cartoon program and a jazz show hosted by Sid Mark. It also carried away games of the Philadelphia 76ers basketball team. The relaunched channel 17 was one of three new UHF stations to launch in the Philadelphia market in 1965. Channel 29 debuted as WIBF-TV on May 16, and channel 48 was activated as WKBS-TV on September 1. WPHL-TV increased its effective radiated power to 1 million watts in August 1966.

== U.S. Communications ownership ==
In 1967, U.S. Communications Corporation, a division of the American Viscose Corporation (AVC), acquired WPHL-TV in exchange for 30 percent of the stock in a larger station group it was assembling. This group would include WPHL-TV and five construction permits for new major-market UHF stations held by Daniel H. Overmyer's Overmyer Communications. The relationship between WPHL-TV and Overmyer had been developing since the start of 1966, when former Overmyer director Robert F. Adams left the company and started a consulting firm serving the Overmyer group and WPHL-TV; further, channel 17 had signed up for the proposed Overmyer Network, which operated in May 1967 under other ownership as the short-lived United Network with WPHL-TV as one of its affiliates. One partner in the investment firm facilitating the sale of the Overmyer construction permits had been a stockholder in channel 17. The FCC approved the sale on December 8, 1967, waiving a proposed rule in place since 1965 that sought to limit television station ownership within the top 50 markets, a practice the FCC had employed before in similar transactions. Katz and Stevens, the previous owners of WPHL-TV, became senior executives in the new U.S. Communications Corporation. After the sale, in May 1968, WPHL-TV built a new tower and transmitter facility in Roxborough, separate from the Wyndmoor studio site, with an effective radiated power of 4.3 million watts.

WPHL-TV, which launched with 76ers games, built an identity as a sports station. It made history in 1969 as the first UHF independent station to air a scheduled regular-season pro football game between the Philadelphia Eagles and Baltimore Colts; the game had been delayed from Sunday to Monday night due to the World Series being played in Baltimore, but WCAU-TV (channel 10), Philadelphia's CBS affiliate, refused to air it to prioritize prime time programming. In November 1970, the Philadelphia Phillies baseball team announced the move of their telecasts from WFIL-TV (channel 6), the team's broadcaster for 21 seasons, in a three-year deal for 70 games a season. This came after AVC acquired the rights from Phillies owner R. R. M. Carpenter Jr. The next season, WPHL dropped the 76ers to carry Big 5 college basketball, which it believed was more popular. In 1974, the station broadcast road games of the Philadelphia Bell in the World Football League.

U.S. Communications considered WPHL-TV its flagship station; it was the strongest ratings performer of the three Philadelphia-market independent stations, with a sign-on–sign-off audience share of 7 percent in November 1969, and the number-one UHF independent nationwide in prime time. WPHL-TV was reportedly the company's only moneymaker when, in October 1970, Stevens was promoted to chief operating officer in an executive reshuffle. At that time, WPHL-TV was detached from U.S. Communications into a separate entity, WPHL-TV Inc. This situation reflected the wide gap in outcomes between WPHL-TV and the other stations. Over the course of 1971, every other U.S. Communications station was threatened with closure: KEMO-TV in San Francisco and WATL-TV in Atlanta were shuttered in March due to low advertising revenues, and the group intended to do the same to WXIX-TV in Cincinnati and WPGH-TV in Pittsburgh that August; WPGH-TV shut down, though the Cincinnati station was ultimately spared and sold to Metromedia. However, WPHL-TV was frequently linked in rumors to financial difficulties of its own, including by creditors of the other AVC stations, and management admitted its sale was a possibility. An attempt to sell the station to Music Fair Enterprises in 1972 fell through. After the transaction was called off, it emerged that the primary reason was a $2.2 million lawsuit filed by program distributor MCA Television for licensing fees it claimed to be owed.

After prior sale attempts, and in spite of the fact that channel 17 was losing money, AVC instead invested in WPHL-TV. In 1975, it moved from Wyndmoor, as well as sales offices on Walnut Street, into a converted A&P grocery store in Philadelphia's Wynnefield neighborhood. That same year, Gene McCurdy became channel 17's new general manager less than a month after being ousted from WPVI-TV.

During the 1970s, channel 17 had a host for horror movies: Joseph Zawislak, better known as Dr. Shock, who developed his on-air persona in the mold of John Zacherle on WCAU-TV. Zawislak's 13-week trial as a host was ended by station management due to low ratings, but after receiving thousands of letters and cards in protest of the cancellation, management reversed its decision and brought him back, first on Saturday nights and later Saturday afternoons; his show was among the station's highest-rated programs outside of Phillies games. His young daughter Doreen, known on air as "Bubbles", frequently appeared. Zawislak, a magician, died of a heart attack in 1979.

== Providence Journal Company ownership ==
As early as 1976, AVC sought to shed non-core business areas and focus on its industrial activities. As a result, it sold WPHL-TV in 1978 for $10 million to the Providence Journal Company (ProJo), publisher of the namesake newspaper in Providence, Rhode Island, and owner of two radio stations there. It was ProJo's first television station. The new ownership made a visible commitment to the station; in 1979, it increased the rights fees it paid to the Phillies just so the team could sign free agent Pete Rose.

In 1981, Taft Broadcasting—owner of channel 29, by this time WTAF-TV—acquired a 47-percent stake in the Philadelphia Phillies baseball team as part of a group headed by team executive Bill Giles. Immediately, it was announced that Phillies games would move to channel 29 beginning in 1984, after the existing WPHL-TV contract ended; this was brought forward a year to 1983 after Taft negotiated a buyout of channel 17's final year on the contract. Simultaneously, in part filling the gap on its schedule, WPHL-TV became the new television home of the Philadelphia 76ers, previously broadcast by WKBS-TV. Beyond sports, WPHL-TV produced Dancin' on Air, a teen dance show, beginning in 1981. The program, originally co-hosted by Eddie Bruce and Bill O'Brien and later by just O'Brien, originated from the WPHL-TV studios as well as theme parks and beaches around the Philadelphia market. Later, a national version, Dance Party USA, was produced from the WPHL-TV studios for the USA Network; it was taped at channel 17 until 1988 and aired until June 1992.

WPHL-TV was the principal beneficiary of the closure of one of its primary competitors. WKBS-TV left the air in August 1983 after no buyer came forward and its owner, Field Enterprises, wished to liquidate. The vast majority of the WKBS-TV program inventory was purchased by the Providence Journal Company for WPHL-TV alongside a $500,000 package of cameras, video tape, and editing equipment.

== New Taft Broadcasting ownership ==
ProJo put WPHL-TV on the market in June 1986 without stating a reason, though it also noted that it had received a number of unsolicited offers. By that time, WPHL-TV was holding on to second in total-day share among the three major Philadelphia independents; the new third station was WGBS-TV (channel 57), owned by Milton Grant, which went on the air in late 1985 and seven months later had risen to either a tie for second with WPHL or a narrow third-place finish, depending on the ratings survey. Five months later, the company opted not to sell WPHL-TV; it had not found a buyer at its reported $100 million asking price amid a national fall in independent TV station valuations. Seven potential buyers toured the station and a dozen or more showed interest.

A deal seemed on again in June 1987 when ProJo announced the sale of WPHL-TV to Odyssey Partners, owner of part or all of four television stations in the eastern U.S. Odyssey had bid about $65 million, but two factors contributed to the collapse of its deal. News of a sale generated additional offers for WPHL-TV from companies that reportedly included Tribune Broadcasting and MCA, each owners of major-market independent stations. At the same time, WGBS-TV owner Grant Broadcasting System was in bankruptcy reorganization, and Odyssey's financiers pulled out when they heard of the proposed reorganization plan that would give creditors control of the company. On July 14, 1987, it transpired that Dudley Taft Communications had acquired the station and that Randy Smith, the general manager of WTAF-TV (which Taft Broadcasting had recently sold to TVX Broadcast Group), was leaving channel 29 to join Taft at channel 17. Dudley Taft Communications was a new company owned by the Taft family, the former owners and namesake of Taft Broadcasting; Dudley Taft had been outbid in his attempt to complete a leveraged buyout of that company earlier in the year.

Dudley's firm, retaining the Taft Broadcasting name, took control on December 29, 1987, and immediately fired six of the nine department chiefs, including general manager Gene McCurdy after a 12-year tenure, making way for five former WTAF-TV executives to replace them. Several other WTAF-TV employees moved over to channel 17 after the change in ownership. Randy Smith outlined a strategy of using the new executives' connections made while at WTAF to compete more vigorously with that station; expressed interest in becoming a Fox affiliate if TVX were ever to sell channel 29; and considered the possibility of starting a newscast "after 1989".

In 1991, the 76ers restructured their deal to reduce the number of games televised from 41 to 10, apparently backing away from a plan to put all games on cable. Channel 17 also became the broadcast home of Philadelphia Flyers hockey, though with fewer games per season than WGBS-TV had offered, and began an effort to win back rights to the Phillies, whose contract with WTXF-TV expired after 1992. That station in turn could no longer accommodate baseball on its own because of increasing programming commitments from Fox and resulting pressure from the network. In January 1992, WPHL-TV and the Phillies announced a five-year deal for 85 regular-season telecasts beginning in 1993.

== Tribune Broadcasting ownership ==
=== Acquisition ===
The new Taft Broadcasting suffered from a high debt load, and in November 1991, it opted to sell its other TV station—WGHP in High Point, North Carolina—back to Great American Communications Company, the original Taft Broadcasting. Days later, Taft announced that Tribune Broadcasting had become an "investment partner" in a $19 million cash infusion that also granted Tribune an option to buy WPHL-TV outright. In the new arrangement, Dudley Taft would continue to run the station with the existing management; he told Broadcasting that the deals were "a response to current conditions that anyone who started business in the late 1980s has had to make". Tribune completed the investment before 1991 closed and then received FCC approval to acquire channel 17 outright, which at the time required a waiver because Tribune also owned WPIX in New York City. In filings with the FCC, Taft indicated that Tribune was likely the only buyer with enough capital to prevent the station from filing for bankruptcy.

Tribune was one of the first affiliate partners for The WB, a new national television network that launched in January 1995; WPHL-TV was committed to the new network upon its November 1993 announcement. The 76ers switched broadcast partners to WGBS-TV for the 1994–95 season. In 1995, channel 17 became the new home of the Mummers Parade on New Year's Day, taking over from KYW-TV after more than a decade.

=== Inquirer News Tonight ===
In January 1994, WPHL-TV and Knight-Ridder, publisher of The Philadelphia Inquirer, announced an association to create and present a nightly, hour-long 10 p.m. newscast utilizing the resources of The Inquirer. The program was produced by KR Video, a subsidiary of Knight-Ridder, from a newsroom and set at WPHL-TV's studios. After two two-week delays, Inquirer News Tonight made its first broadcast on September 26, 1994, promising viewers "tomorrow's news now". Its lead anchors came from other cities. Jim Watkins had last worked in Cincinnati, and Victoria Hong came from Buffalo; both departed by the end of 1995.

Inquirer News Tonight was beset with difficulties in making the specialties of a newspaper work in a television news format; The Inquirer's television critic, Jonathan Storm, found the quality of stories delivered by the print and broadcast journalists uneven. The Newspaper Guild's insistence that Inquirer staffers be compensated led to a boycott that began in December 1994 and ended in August 1995; the boycott was later cited as a reason for the program's demise. Other contributing factors included baseball and hockey strikes that deprived Inquirer News Tonight of sports lead-ins at launch; a lack of a sound business plan; and low ratings against WTXF-TV's established 10 p.m. newscast.

=== WB17 News at Ten and news outsourcing ===
After being shortened to 30 minutes in June 1996, the Inquirer News Tonight partnership was disbanded. The last edition of Inquirer News Tonight aired on December 29, 1996; the next day, WPHL-TV assumed full control of the news department, retaining three-fourths of the staff, and began airing the WB17 News at Ten in its stead. The weeknight co-anchors of Inquirer News Tonight, Steve Highsmith and Toni Yates, were assigned to anchor the weeknight and weekend editions of the retooled newscast.

In 1997, channel 17 became the television home of Philadelphia Eagles preseason games, pre- and postgame shows, and coaches' shows; the relationship lasted seven years before KYW-TV took over in 2003. The growth of The WB as well as a desire to protect the 10 p.m. newscast put an end to the station's relationship with the Phillies; ratings had declined since the first season in 1993, when the Phillies won the National League pennant. After the 1998 season, the Phillies and WPHL-TV attempted to negotiate a renewal, but channel 17 offered to telecast just 35 to 40 games a season. This was unsatisfactory to the club, leading to a deal for 70 games on WPSG.

WPHL-TV's "Philadelphia's WB 17" logo, used from 2000 to 2006.

Over the course of the early 2000s, WPHL-TV continued tinkering with its newscast, which was behind WTXF-TV in the ratings. In 2000, Leslie Glenn moved from Tribune-owned WLVI to become WPHL-TV's general manager. She moved to rebrand the station as "Philadelphia's WB17", committed to an expansion of the 10 p.m. news to an hour, and expressed a desire to add more newscasts in other dayparts. At the time, of Tribune's stations in the top six television markets, WPHL was the only one with just one daily newscast. Sportscaster Mike Dardis was named news anchor, replacing Highsmith, who moved into a role of chief political correspondent, and Mike Missanelli, a sports talk host at WIP, replaced Dardis on sports. The hour-long news debuted September 12, 2001, nearly a week ahead of schedule, after the September 11 attacks. In the first major ratings survey after the move to an hour, WPHL had a 3% share compared to WTXF's 7%. The newscast was trimmed back to 30 minutes on January 1, 2004, after Glenn was replaced by Vincent Giannini of WPIX; Giannini believed the newscast had been more successful and more differentiated as a half-hour product. By February 2005, the ratings competition at 10 p.m. had become more lopsided, with WTXF attracting a 9% share and WPHL a 3% share.

On September 21, 2005, WPHL-TV fired its entire 30-person news staff, effective December 9, and outsourced its 10 p.m. newscast to NBC-owned WCAU. The continued low ratings no longer supported the costs to maintain a standalone news department. The move was part of an expansion of an existing relationship between NBC and Tribune; Tribune's WBZL in Miami had been airing a newscast from the NBC station there since 1997, and simultaneous with the Philadelphia move, Tribune outsourced the newscast at its WB affiliate in San Diego. On December 12, the WCAU newscast launched, retaining the title WB17 News at Ten but featuring WCAU on-air presenters including Vince DeMentri, Lori Delgado, and Vai Sikahema on weeknights and meteorologist Amy Freeze on weekends.

=== From WB to MyNetworkTV ===
On January 24, 2006, the merger of The WB and rival UPN into The CW was announced. Twelve CBS-owned UPN stations and 16 Tribune Broadcasting stations were chosen as charter affiliates of The CW, but in Philadelphia, WPSG was chosen over WPHL-TV. WPHL-TV and Tribune-owned stations in two other conflict markets that had similarly been bypassed—WATL in Atlanta and KTWB-TV in Seattle—signed affiliation agreements in May with MyNetworkTV, set up by Fox Television Stations to serve its own ex-UPN outlets and other displaced stations. The station rebranded as "MyPHL17" ahead of the affiliation change.

For the first time since 1998 and the third time overall, the Philadelphia Phillies returned to WPHL-TV beginning with the 2009 season, coming off their World Series win the year before; the three-year deal included 45 regular-season baseball games a season. The relationship ended after the 2013 season when the Phillies signed a 25-year rights deal with Comcast SportsNet (now NBC Sports Philadelphia); Comcast by that point owned NBC and placed some games on WCAU instead.

On October 31, 2011, WPHL-TV debuted a morning news program, using Tribune's EyeOpener format. This combined local inserts with a national program, produced out of Tribune-owned KDAF in Dallas, and was launched there and in Philadelphia and three other markets.

For 2018, WPHL-TV joined WPVI-TV as a broadcaster of Philadelphia Union soccer, with WPVI producing the telecasts but WPHL broadcasting most games. The deal with both broadcasters was renewed in 2020, but after the 2022 season, all local television rights agreements in Major League Soccer were discontinued to make way for MLS's 10-year deal with Apple. WPHL continued its association with the club by airing a weekly coaches' show, Union Insider, in 2023.

== Nexstar ownership and CW switch ==
Sinclair Broadcast Group entered into an agreement to acquire Tribune Media on May 8, 2017, for $3.9 billion, plus the assumption of $2.7 billion in Tribune debt. The deal received significant scrutiny over Sinclair's forthrightness in its applications to sell certain conflict properties, prompting the FCC to designate it for hearing and leading Tribune to terminate the deal and sue Sinclair for breach of contract.

Following the Sinclair deal's collapse, Nexstar Media Group of Irving, Texas, announced its purchase of Tribune Media on December 3, 2018, for $6.4 billion in cash and debt. The sale was completed on September 19, 2019.

In October 2022, Nexstar Media Group acquired a 75-percent stake in The CW. A provision in the contract released CBS, one of its former owners, from its affiliation agreements for eight CW stations, including WPSG in Philadelphia, on September 1, 2023. In three of the eight markets, Nexstar-owned stations—including WPHL-TV—assumed the CW affiliation on that date, with MyNetworkTV programming continuing on a subchannel. Giannini retired after 20 years in 2024 and was replaced as general manager by Lloyd Bucher, previously of WJZY in Charlotte, North Carolina.

== Local programming ==
=== Newscasts ===
After nearly seven years with news produced by WCAU, WPHL-TV contracted with WPVI-TV for a 10 p.m. newscast beginning September 15, 2012. The new Action News at 10 on PHL17 featured WPVI's existing 4 p.m. anchor team. Initially a 30-minute program like the WCAU-produced newscast it replaced, Action News at 10 expanded to an hour in September 2014.

WPHL-TV debuted an in-house morning newscast by 2015, which aired alongside EyeOpener and later Morning Dose, another syndicated morning news effort produced by Tribune. Morning Dose shut down in 2018, and WPHL's morning newscast was expanded from 90 minutes to three hours to fill the gap. It was four hours long by 2020.

=== Sports ===
In 2018, WPHL-TV became the broadcast home of Philadelphia Wings lacrosse with a schedule including all home and select away games. In more recent years, the station has shared the schedule; for the 2021–22 season, it was a co-partner with NBC Sports Philadelphia, and in 2024–25, it was scheduled to show two games while WPSG was to air 14 contests.

== Notable former on-air staff ==
- Jenna Wolfe – sports reporter

== Subchannels ==
WPHL-TV and WUVP are broadcast from a tower in Roxborough.

Subchannels of WPHL-TV and WUVP-DT
License	Subchannel	Res.	Short name	Programming
WPHL-TV	17.1	720p	WPHL-DT	The CW
WPHL-TV	17.2	480i	Antenna	Antenna TV (primary); MyNetworkTV (secondary)
WPHL-TV	17.3	480i	GRIT	Grit
WPHL-TV	17.4	480i	Comet	Comet
WUVP-DT	65.1	720p	WUVP-DT	Univision
WUVP-DT	65.2	480i	Bounce	Bounce TV
WUVP-DT	65.3	480i	Crime	True Crime Network (WMGM-TV)

Simulcast of subchannels of another station

WPHL-TV began broadcasting a digital signal using channel 54 on October 31, 2002. The analog signal on channel 17 was shut down on June 12, 2009, as part of the digital television transition, and the digital signal moved to channel 17 on that date. In 2017, WPHL-TV began broadcasting WUVP-DT (channel 65), the Univision station for Philadelphia, from its transmitter after Univision sold its spectrum in the 2016 United States wireless spectrum auction and entering into a channel sharing agreement to broadcast its programming using the WPHL-TV transmitter.
