= Kathy Orr =

Kathy Orr may refer to:

- Kathy Orr (meteorologist), chief meteorologist
- Kathy Orr (writer), Canadian romance writer
