= Irv Homer =

Irving Homer (May 29, 1924 – June 24, 2009) was an American radio talk show host and television personality, primarily in the Philadelphia, Pennsylvania market.

== Early career ==
Born in Philadelphia, Homer was an Army Air Force veteran of World War II, flying B-17 Flying Fortress planes out of Italy with the 15th Air Force. He flew 15 bombing missions as a pilot. For several years after the war, he was a member of the Reserves. He spent much of his adult life in a variety of careers, including bartending (he owned two taverns) and selling equipment for a pizza company.

In the 1972 U.S. presidential election, Homer was the vice presidential running mate to John Mahalchik on the America First party ticket. Mahalchik and Homer garnered 1,743 popular votes, and zero electoral votes in their unsuccessful election bid.

== Radio career ==
After stints at several small suburban Philadelphia talk radio stations in the late 1960s and early 1970s, he joined WWDB-FM in Philadelphia, and hosted a talk show on current affairs from 1975 until 2000, when the station changed its format to music. His show was the top talk show for most of that time. During his time at WWDB, Homer became a vocal and notable public presence in the resurgent anti-tax movement. This ultimately led to him being labeled by the IRS as a V.T.P., or Violent Tax Protestor, a title he referred to as a dubious honor, given that his "violence" was simply free speech under the 1st Amendment. Starting in 1991, he appeared as a regular panelist on Inside Story, a news and public affairs show on Philadelphia's ABC affiliate, WPVI-TV.

Post-WWDB, Homer moved his talk show to a small local station, WBCB-AM in Levittown, Pennsylvania. The Irv Homer Show on WBCB aired from 1:00 p.m. to 2:00 p.m. from 2001 until January 2007. For a brief period between 2001 and 2002, Homer also hosted a Sunday evening radio show on CBS-owned Philadelphia news/talk station WPHT-AM.

Up until the time of his death, Homer continued to do periodic hour-long podcasts produced by his son, Ronn Homer, which were posted on his website. Because the show was taped, he did not take calls. In July 2008, he began a live Ustream broadcast, and started taking phone calls.

== Death ==
Active until the very end of his life, Homer collapsed while giving a lecture at Eastern University. He was taken to Bryn Mawr Hospital, where he was pronounced dead later that evening.

The Broadcast Pioneers of Philadelphia posthumously inducted Homer into their Hall of Fame in 2010.
