= TDY =

TDY may refer to:

- Teledyne Technologies, an American conglomerate (stock symbol TDY)
- Temporary duty assignment, in the US military
- Tour de Yorkshire, a bicycle race in England
- WTDY-FM, a Philadelphia radio station branded as "96.5 TDY"
