= Toni Yates =

American news reporter and anchorwoman (born 1963)

Toni Yates (born November 1962) is an American news reporter and anchorwoman who currently works for WABC-TV as their New Jersey reporter.

== Early life and education ==
Yates graduated from Bishop Kenny High School in Jacksonville, and Florida State University.

== Career ==
Yates started her career in news in Savannah, Georgia, first at WTOC-TV and then at WSAV-TV. In 1986, she joined the staff of WTLV in Jacksonville as weekend anchor; she departed WTLV in 1987 when she got married and moved to Virginia Beach, Virginia. While in Virginia, she was the communications director for the local chapter of the March of Dimes. After three years in Virginia, she returned to Jacksonville in 1990 to be a weekend anchor at WJXT. She departed a year later in order to be closer to her husband, Arthur Fennell, then an anchor at WCAU-TV in Philadelphia.

After a year as a night news reporter for WGAL-TV in nearby Lancaster, she was hired as reporter for the startup Inquirer News Tonight newscast aired by WPHL-TV in Philadelphia. Yates also served as weekend anchor until 1995, when she was promoted to the weeknight newscasts. When WPHL-TV assumed control of the newscast at the end of 1996, it went to a single-anchor format and moved Yates back to weekends.

Yates worked for WPHL-TV until December 31, 2004, after which she exited when contract renewal talks failed. In July 2006, she was hired as New Jersey reporter for WABC-TV; she had been living in New Jersey since her time at WGAL.

== Personal life ==
Yates and her husband divorced in 1998 after having two daughters. Yates later had a third child after marrying Philadelphia firefighter Chuck Harvey.
