= Edie Huggins =

American journalist (1935–2008)

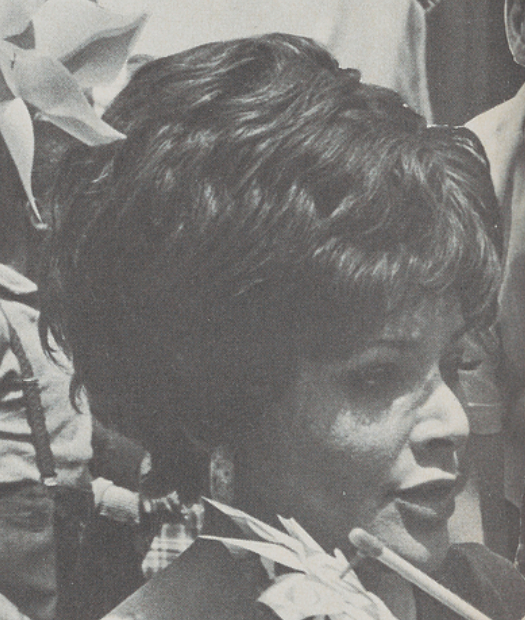
- Huggins in 1971
- Born: August 14, 1935; St. Joseph, Missouri, U.S.
- Died: July 29, 2008 (aged 72); Philadelphia, Pennsylvania, U.S.
- Resting place: West Laurel Hill Cemetery, Bala Cynwyd, Pennsylvania, U.S.
- Occupations: Television reporter, journalist and broadcaster

Edie Huggins (August 14, 1935 – July 29, 2008), born Edith "Eddie" Lou Thompson, was an American television reporter, journalist and broadcaster. In 1966, Huggins became one of the first female African-American television news reporters in Philadelphia. She worked on WCAU-TV for 42 years; the longest consecutive television run for a Philadelphia TV news reporter. She was inducted into the Broadcast Pioneers of Philadelphia Hall of Fame in 2002.

== Early life and education ==
Huggins was born Edith "Eddie" Lou Thompson on August 14, 1935, in Saint Joseph, Missouri. She became known as Edie (pronounced Eedee) later in life. She graduated from Bartlett High School in St. Joseph in 1953. At 14 years of age, she won a contest to appear on radio station KRES and was so popular she was offered a Saturday evening show geared toward teenagers. She was the first African-American radio disc jockey in Saint Joseph, Missouri.

After being denied entrance to the University of Missouri due to her race, she attended the University of Nebraska on a music scholarship. She was the first African-American to be crowned Miss Cornhusker in 1954. She dropped out of school to marry Hastings Huggins. She returned to school and graduated cum laude with a bachelor's degree in science from the State University of New York at Plattsburgh while working at night as a nurse.

== Career ==
She moved to New York City when her husband took a job at IBM. She worked as a registered nurse and was employed by both Bellevue Hospital and Flower Fifth Avenue Hospital. Simultaneously, she was hired as a consultant for the NBC daytime soap opera The Doctors, which began airing in 1963. Her consulting working soon led to acting roles on the drama. Her other soap-opera acting credits included Love of Life and The Edge of Night which were aired on CBS. Huggins was also cast in the 1966 film A Man Called Adam, opposite Sammy Davis Jr., Ossie Davis, Frank Sinatra Jr. and Louis Armstrong.

External videos
- “Edie's People: Peter Nero”, Edie Huggins in an undated interview with Peter Nero, WCAU-TV, Philadelphia

Huggins was initially hired as a features reporter at WCAU-TV of Philadelphia in 1966 for a show called The Big News Team with John Facenda, following a chance encounter with a broadcast executive in a New York City restaurant. That executive was Bruce Bryant, the general manager of WCAU-TV, or Channel 10, which was a CBS network affiliate at the time. He asked her to change her name from Eddie Lou Huggins to Edie Huggins. She was now divorced with two children and arrived in Philadelphia for her new job with her two children and just $65.

In a 2006 interview for her fortieth anniversary with WCAU, Huggins confided that she had been hired despite a lack of on-air, live television experience. She stated that the reason that she was hired was to compete against the then-local NBC affiliate, KYW-TV, which had just hired its first African-American female reporter, Trudy Haynes. Huggins herself made history when she joined WCAU by becoming the station's first African-American female reporter.

Following her success on WCAU, the management of the television station gave Huggins her own show, Morning Side. Huggins also co-hosted a midday news show called What's Happening during the early 1970s with Herb Clarke. Her other shows on WCAU included Horizons and Huggins' Heroes, which focused on ordinary local people who had accomplished notable achievements, especially for the benefit of the larger community. Huggins Heroes became a weekly profile feature on WCAU news broadcasts during the 1990s and 2000s (decade), and highlighted Huggins's reputation as a reporter who focused on "unsung heroes" throughout the Philadelphia region.

In 2006, the Philadelphia City Council honored Huggins on her fortieth anniversary at WCAU (by then an NBC affiliate) by proclaiming "Edie Huggins Day" in the city. "Edie Huggins Day" was officially proclaimed with a resolution on March 30, 2006. She was chosen by the Urban League of Philadelphia as one of the "Outstanding African American Philadelphians of the 20th century". She was honored by the Philadelphia Chapter of American Women in Radio & Television as Communicator of the Year. In 2008, she received a lifetime achievement award from the Philadelphia Association of Black Journalists and the Governor's Award from the Mid-Atlantic Chapter of the National Academy of Television Arts and Sciences. She was inducted into The Broadcast Pioneers of Philadelphia Hall of Fame in 2002.

Huggins was a founding member of the National Association of Black Journalists. Professionally, Huggins was often cited by colleagues as a mentor and was affectionately referred to as "Miss Edie" by younger reporters and staff throughout the Philadelphia television news industry.

In 2006, Huggins was cast in the lead role in the independent film So Big, which debuted on May 3, 2008, at International House in Philadelphia.

== Death ==
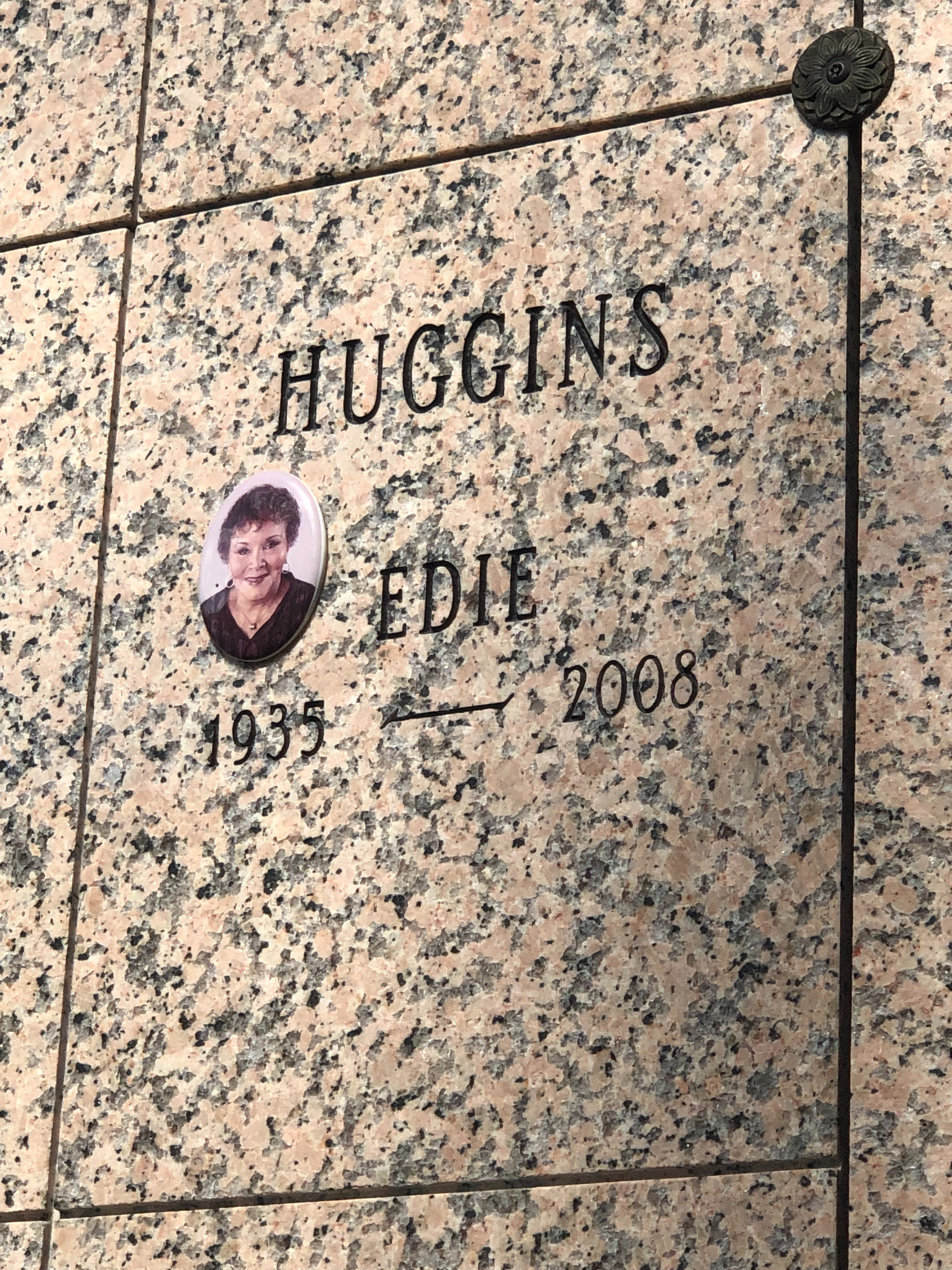
Edie Huggins' grave at West Laurel Hill Cemetery

Edie Huggins died of lung cancer on July 29, 2008, at the age of 72. She was survived by her two children, Hastings Edward Huggins and Laurie Linn. A memorial service held at Huggins's church, Bright Hope Baptist Church, in North Philadelphia was attended by many members of Philadelphia's media. She was interred at West Laurel Hill Cemetery in Bala Cynwyd, Pennsylvania.
