= Lori Delgado =

American journalist

Lori Delgado was a news anchor for WCAU in Philadelphia, Pennsylvania, United States. There she was the weekday co-anchor of NBC 10 News Today with Terry Ruggles and was also a general assignment reporter for NBC 10 News. Delgado joined the WCAU news team on January 24, 2005.

Delgado abruptly resigned from WCAU on October 6, 2008. She and the station were named in a civil lawsuit by former anchor Vince DeMentri. DeMentri sued Delgado and NBC 10 for libel and slander.

DeMentri had left the station in July 2008, after alleged vandalism of Delgado's car. Police had been called to the station to investigate items allegedly missing from Delgado's desk and the keying of her car in the station's parking lot. The complaint named DeMentri, but he was not charged. DeMentri and Delgado had previously had a particularly close friendship which later soured.

She resigned the same day the suit was filed. Delgado and NBC-10 came to an undisclosed monetary settlement. DeMentri dropped his suit and his gender-bias complaint with the state Human Relations Commission. DeMentri alleged that he was fired based on an affair with Delgado.

In the DeMentri case, WCAU issued a statement saying, "WCAU has amicably resolved its differences with Vince DeMentri. As a native of Philadelphia, Vince has made a terrific contribution to the station over the last five years. We wish Vince continued success in his career and know that his future employer, whether in his hometown or city of his choice, will benefit greatly from his journalistic skills and dedication to his craft."

== Professional career ==
Delgado graduated from Skidmore College with a bachelor's degree in Sociology. After that she started working as a news production assistant at WRGB in Niskayuna, New York and shortly began working as a reporter with Robinson Media in West Palm Beach, Florida. Prior to moving to Philadelphia, she worked at News 12 The Bronx as an anchor and reporter.

== Personal life ==
Delgado grew up in Manhattan, NY and is married to lawyer Rich McNally. Before WCAU fired her, they lived in the Philadelphia area with their Yorkshire Terrier, Riley. After the firing, they returned to New York.
