= Tracy Davidson =

American news presenter (born 1963)

- Born: June 10
- Education: Temple University
- Occupation: Former News Anchor
- Title: NBC 10 News Anchor (1996-2025)
- Website: http://www.tracydavidson.com

Tracy Davidson (born June 10) is a former news presenter for WCAU in Philadelphia, Pennsylvania. She co-anchored NBC 10 News weekdays at 4 p.m. and 5 p.m. until November 2025 when she decided to end her career at the station after nearly 30 years to pursue a career in the field of public speaking full-time.

She has been with the station since 1996 when she was brought in to present the weekend morning news. In 1999, Davidson won a Mid-Atlantic Emmy Award in the "Outstanding Service News" category for her reporting work. She won another as a presenter/reporter in 2001, in the "Outstanding Community Outreach Program" category. She has won 14 Emmy Awards total - most recently in 2022.

Davidson attended State University of New York at Geneseo and graduated from Temple University She has a Religious Studies certificate from St Charles Borromeo Seminary and a masters in Holistic Spirituality from Chestnut Hill College.
