= Sid Mark =

American radio personality (1933–2022)

- Born: Sidney Mark Fliegelman; May 30, 1933; Camden, New Jersey, U.S.
- Died: April 18, 2022 (aged 88); Bryn Mawr, Pennsylvania, U.S.
- Spouses: Loretta Katz (divorced): Judy Avery
- Children: 4

Sidney Mark Fliegelman (May 30, 1933 – April 18, 2022), known professionally as Sid Mark, was an American radio disc jockey based in Philadelphia, Pennsylvania. Mark was best known for hosting a weekly syndicated radio program featuring the music of singer Frank Sinatra, including commentary, interviews, trivia facts and other information to add color and context.

== Early life ==
Mark was born on May 30, 1933, in Philadelphia, and had an orthodox Jewish upbringing. He served two years in the United States Army, serving as an infantryman during the Korean War, and afterwards began hosting a live broadcast of a Saturday Jazz show at the Red Hill Inn in Pennsauken, New Jersey.

== Career ==
Mark's shows included Sunday with Sinatra, airing 11 a.m. to 1 p.m. each Sunday on 96.5 WWDB FM and later 1210 WPHT in Philadelphia, and The Sounds of Sinatra, which was syndicated nationally through the Westwood One radio network. The first version of Mark's Sinatra shows was Friday with Frank, which began airing in 1957 over WHAT and WHAT-FM, where Mark was a disc jockey, and ran nearly continuously in Philadelphia until his death. Mark only missed one show, in 1999 for open heart surgery.

Mark also hosted a televised jazz show called The Mark of Jazz, which initially debuted March 5 1964 on channel 12 WHYY and lasted through January 1965. It was later picked up in October 1965 by channel 17 WPHL for another season. Another 13 episode run began in October 1974.

== Honors ==
The Broadcast Pioneers of Philadelphia inducted Mark into their Hall of Fame in 2001, while the Pennsylvania Association of Broadcasters named Mark Broadcaster of the Year 2018 in May of that year.

Sid Mark was inducted into the Radio Hall of Fame in 2022.

== Personal life and death ==
Mark married his wife Judy in 1973; they had a daughter, Stacey. Sid had three sons from a previous marriage, Andy, the oldest, Eric and Brian, who worked on Sid's radio program.

Mark died on April 18, 2022, in Bryn Mawr, Pennsylvania, at the age of 88.
