= Kathy Orr (meteorologist) =

American television meteorologist

Kathleen "Kathy" Orr is a meteorologist, for the Fox 29 Weather Authority team on WTXF in Philadelphia, Pennsylvania.

== Background ==
She is a graduate of the S. I. Newhouse School of Public Communications at Syracuse University.

Orr has her National Weather Association and American Meteorological Society seals of approval in addition to being an AMS (number 106) Certified Broadcast Meteorologist.

On November 22, 2013, Orr was inducted into the Broadcast Pioneers of Philadelphia Hall of Fame.

== Career in Philadelphia ==
Orr joined KYW-TV in January 2003 as their chief meteorologist, making her debut on the same night as Marc Howard, who had been an anchor on WPVI, the ABC O&O in Philadelphia. She came from WCAU-TV where she had worked as a weekend Meteorologist. She was reportedly asked to be chief meteorologist at WCAU when John Bolaris left but turned that down when she received a better salary offer from KYW-TV for chief meteorologist there. The offer at WCAU was ultimately taken by Glenn Schwartz.

Shortly after coming to the station, Orr is credited with coming up with the name "Live Mega Doppler 3" for their radar. She also was the first to develop a summer series highlighting the Jersey Shore. For over 12 years "Orr at the Shore," aired on Thursdays between Memorial Day and Labor Day.

In August, 2011, it was announced that Orr, with a desire to spend more time with her family, would only be handling the 10 p.m. weather on the CW Philly 57, and the 11 p.m. weather on CBS3. Morning meteorologist Kate Bilo took over Orr's vacancy at 5 and 6 p.m. She was fired at CBS3 in July 2015 along with sports director Beasley Reece when new management took over. On September 13, 2015, Orr announced on 94.1 WIP radio that she would be returning to full-time at FOX 29 and would now be doing afternoon and evening shows at 5, 6, 10, and 11pm.
