= Beasley Reece =

American football player (born 1954)

No. 82, 28, 43
- Position: Defensive back

Personal information
- Born: March 18, 1954 (age 72); Waco, Texas, U.S.
- Listed height: 6 ft 1 in (1.85 m)
- Listed weight: 193 lb (88 kg)

Career information
- High school: La Vega (Waco)
- College: North Texas State
- NFL draft: 1976: 9th round, 264th overall pick

Career history
- Dallas Cowboys (1976); New York Giants (1977–1983); Tampa Bay Buccaneers (1983–1984)

Career NFL statistics
- Interceptions: 18
- Fumble recoveries: 16
- Defensive TDs: 1
- Stats at Pro Football Reference

Beasley Young Reece Jr. (born March 18, 1954) is an American former professional football player who was a defensive back in the National Football League (NFL) for the Dallas Cowboys, New York Giants and Tampa Bay Buccaneers. He played college football for the North Texas State Mean Green.

== Early life ==
Reece attended La Vega High School, where he played as a cornerback. He walked-on at North Texas State University in the spring of 1972.

The next year he played part-time. As a junior, he became a starter at left cornerback and had 2 interceptions. As a senior he posted 2 interceptions.

== Professional career ==
=== Dallas Cowboys ===
Reece was selected by the Dallas Cowboys in the ninth round (264th overall) of the 1976 NFL draft. The team drafted him as an athlete, so he spent his first weeks in training camp as a cornerback, before being switched to wide receiver. Playing against the New Orleans Saints in week 2, he registered his only NFL reception, which went for 6 yards, but also fumbled on the play.

The next year he requested the opportunity to compete at cornerback. He was waived on September 12, 1977.

=== New York Giants ===
On September 14, 1977, the New York Giants claimed him off waivers to play as a defensive back. He became the starter at strong safety in 1978, before being switched to free safety in 1981.

In 1983, he asked for his release after rookie Terry Kinard was given the starting free safety position and he was cut on October 17.

=== Tampa Bay Buccaneers ===
The Tampa Bay Buccaneers claimed him off waivers on October 18, 1983. Despite playing only half of the season (8 starts), he registered 33 tackles, 5 passes defensed and led the team with 6 interceptions. The next year, he started 14 games at free safety, finishing with 70 tackles, 12 passes defensed, one interception and 7 special teams tackles. He was waived on September 2, 1985.

== Broadcasting career ==
After his retirement from playing Reece worked as a color commentator and sideline reporter for NFL coverage on NBC and CBS, and served as an analyst for the 1992 Summer Olympics for NBC. During this time, he was the sports director for WVIT (NBC-30) in Hartford, Connecticut. He would also work in at WTOG Tampa Bay. When he came to CBS, he joined KYW-TV in Philadelphia, and became their Sports Director, a position he held from July 1998 to July 2015. Reece is an Eagle Scout and recipient of the Distinguished Eagle Scout Award.

In 2012, the Broadcast Pioneers of Philadelphia inducted Reece into its Hall of Fame.

On July 1, 2015, Reece was fired from KYW along with evening anchor Chris May and chief meteorologist Kathy Orr as a new general manager decided to take the Eyewitness News program in a different direction.

== Personal life ==
Reese and his wife Paula have been married since 1978. They have two children. Reese is an avid classical piano player and is a member of the Alpha Phi Alpha fraternity. He is a cousin of former NFL players Greg Pruitt and Randy Logan.
