= Jim Watkins (news anchor) =

American journalist

James Raymond Watkins (born October 21, 1956) is an American journalist and television news presenter/anchor.

== Career ==
Watkins, a graduate of Wyoming High School near Cincinnati and the University of Tennessee at Knoxville (during which time he was an intern reporter at WTVK), started in television news at WKPT-TV in Kingsport, Tennessee, in 1978. He moved away from 1979 to 1980 but returned to Kingsport and in 1981 began anchoring the station's 11 p.m. newscast. By 1985, Watkins was working at WTVF in Nashville,

In 1989, Watkins left WTVF; he declined a morning slot when the 5 p.m. newscast he had been hosting, Extra, was canceled. He left for Boston with his wife, Lauren Thierry, who got a job at WBZ-TV there. Watkins also worked at WBZ-TV, anchoring its Evening Magazine until the program was canceled in 1991. He worked on the syndicated programs Personalities and Entertainment Daily Journal during this time.

Watkins was hired in 1992 by WLWT in Cincinnati to anchor weekend morning news. While in Cincinnati, Watkins's wife Thierry worked in New York for American Journal, and he commuted there twice a month. This in part motivated Watkins and WLWT to part ways in March 1994. He was hired to host a new newscast at WPHL-TV in Philadelphia, Inquirer News Tonight, which launched in September 1994. Watkins left Inquirer News Tonight in August 1995 to become the weekend anchor at WNBC in New York.

In 1998, WPIX hired Watkins to replace Jack Cafferty on its weeknight 10 p.m. newscasts alongside Kaity Tong. While working at WPIX, Watkins received three Emmy awards and an Edward R. Murrow Award for Broadcast Excellence. Watkins was Tribune Broadcasting's lead anchor during live coverage of the September 11 attacks, anchoring for five days. In 2014, his recollections of the tragedy, starting with the day before the World Trade Center attack, were featured in the NatGeo documentary 9/10: The Final Hours.

After Watkins was demoted to weekends in 2010 when he and Tong were replaced by Jodi Applegate, Watkins departed the station in September 2011. He then briefly worked mornings at WTNH in New Haven, Connecticut.

== Personal life ==
Watkins has three children, including a son with autism.
