= Paul Barsky =

American radio talk show host

- Born: Buffalo, New York
- Occupation: Radio host

Paul Barsky is an American radio talk show host and comedian, born in Buffalo, New York.

== Early Radio Career (Late 1970s–1985) ==
He got started in radio while attending college in upstate New York and landed his first on-air role at WAXC in Rochester, NY Upon leaving college, and after a few years in Rochester radio, Barsky's big career break came when he was offered the opportunity to host a national satellite network radio show on ABC's Superadio in New York City. This idea of a nationally syndicated music radio service was a precursor to many satellite radio subscription services that surfaced over a decade later and are still offered today. Unfortunately Superadio was years before its time and never achieved a successful launch, but it opened the door to Barsky's first major market morning show, hosting the AM-Drive slot at WCAU-FM in Philadelphia. WCAU-FM's "The Barsky Show" was well received and had become incredibly popular in the ratings, growing into one of the most listened to major market morning shows in the country.

== Leaving Philadelphia for Chicago & Houston (1985–1993) ==
High ratings in Philadelphia garnered the attention of ABC Radio's WLS-FM in Chicago. At WLS-FM, Barsky hosted mornings where his show became one of the highest rated from the mid to late 80s. After taking a break from day to day radio to pursue radio acquisitions, Barsky returned to morning radio in 1991 at KRBE Houston.

== Returning to Philadelphia (1993–2008) ==
In 1993, he again returned to Philadelphia, taking over the morning show at Philadelphia's Y100. This is where Barsky's show was named " Major Market Show of the Year" by FMQB, an industry trade publication. Barsky continued to work in Philadelphia for many years, most notably hosting mornings at WMMR where he was recognized by trade publication Radio and Records in the " Rock Personality of the Year" category, as well as WPTP and WYSP.

== Barsky Returns to Texas (2009–2011) ==
In 2009, Barsky moved to Dallas to host a Sports Talk morning show on 105.3 FM, The Fan, a CBS station.

In addition to hosting radio programs on the air, Barsky has taken on off air roles as well. Throughout his career, he's spent time managing, programming and dabbling in station ownership opportunities.

== Barsky Comes to South Florida (2011–) ==
Paul Barsky is currently living in South Florida, where he has hosted an afternoon comedy variety talk show at Big Talk 850 WFTL , a 50,000-watt station covering the Miami, Ft. Lauderdale and West Palm Beach markets.
