= WHAT (AM) =

Spanish-language contemporary hit radio station in Philadelphia

- Philadelphia, Pennsylvania; United States
- Broadcast area: Philadelphia metropolitan area
- Frequency: 1340 kHz
- Branding: Groovin' 99.9

Programming
- Format: Rhythmic oldies

Ownership
- Owner: Sabatino Cupelli; (Philly Radio, Inc.)

History
- First air date: October 17, 1922
- Former call signs: WNAT (1922–1929)
- Call sign meaning: The hat of the William Penn statue atop Philadelphia City Hall

Technical information
- Licensing authority: FCC
- Facility ID: 33686
- Class: C
- Power: 1,000 watts
- Transmitter coordinates: 40°0′6.4″N 75°12′33.6″W
- Translator: 99.9 W260CZ (Philadelphia)

Links
- Public license information: Public file; LMS
- Webcast: Listen live
- Website: groovin99.com

WHAT (1340 kHz) is a commercial AM radio station in Philadelphia, Pennsylvania, United States. The station is owned by Philly Radio, Inc. It airs a rhythmic oldies format. It was one of the first radio stations in Philadelphia, going on the air in 1922.

WHAT is powered at 1,000 watts. The transmitter is on Conshohocken Avenue, near Fairmount Park. Programming is also heard on 50-watt FM translator W260CZ at 99.9 MHz. It uses its FM dial position for its moniker "Groovin' 99.9."

== History ==
=== WNAT / WHAT (1922–1944) ===
On October 17, 1922, a new Philadelphia radio station was authorized, as WNAT, by the government to the Lennig Brothers Co., a radio supply company headed up by Frederick Lennig at 827 Spring Garden Street. The call sign was randomly assigned from a roster of available call letters. In late 1929, the call sign was changed to WHAT.

In the 1930s, WHAT was powered at 100 watts and was heard on 1310 kHz. It had to share time on that frequency with other radio stations. The station had studios in the Public Ledger Building.

Ownership of the station changed twice within a two-year span. In 1939, the Bonwit Teller department store replaced The Evening Ledger newspaper as owner; in July 1940, J. David Stern, who published The Philadelphia Record newspaper bought the station from Bonwit Teller. At that time, WHAT operated with 100 watts of power.

=== Banks ownership (1944–1986) ===
On February 12, 1944, former radio station WIP salesman William Banks purchased WHAT for $22,500 from the Philadelphia Record and became the station's new president. His sister, Dolly Banks, became program director and expanded on the ethnic format while ending time-brokered programming.

According to The Philadelphia Inquirer, WHAT was known for innovation. "In 1945, WHAT became the first U.S. radio station to hire a full-time black announcer, the first to program a regular show featuring a black woman as hostess and the first station in the city to hire black newscasters. It also was the first in the nation to feature a black as host of a daily talk show."

In 1954, the station moved its studios and transmitters to a new structure at 3930-3940 Conshohocken Ave in Wynnefield Heights and was dubbed "The WHAT Radio Center".

=== Ownership changes (1986–2007) ===
In October 1986, Reginald N. Lavong and Miller Parker, owners of Main Line Communications purchased WHAT from Independence Broadcasting for $625,000. The sale included the station's office building and 4.5 acres of land on Conshohocken Ave. Former sister station WWDB was sold to lawyer Ragan Henry around the same time. In 1989, the station, now running an African American-oriented talk and nostalgia format, was sold to Philadelphia radio veteran Cody Anderson. Anderson had been general manager of WDAS-AM-FM and his company "KBT Communications" paid $1.65 million to obtain WHAT. Anderson moved the WHAT offices and studios to North 54th Street near City Line Avenue in nearby Wynnefield.

In 2007, WHAT was sold to Marconi Broadcasting, who ended the station's longtime African American focus. Known for years as the "Voice of the African American Community", all station employees, including hosts Albert Butler, Elmer Smith, and Mary Mason were let go.

=== New formats (2007–present) ===
WHAT programmed an "urban talk" format until 2007. From 2004 to 2006, they were an affiliate of Air America Radio and carried several shows from the network. The station was sold in 2006. On January 19, 2007, after stunting with a variety of music ranging from classical pieces to modern hits, the new owners programmed an alternative rock music format called "Skin Radio". Skin Radio also featured many local musicians and poets. It was seen as a replacement to Y-100, a former modern rock station in Philadelphia. Though no longer on-air, Skin Radio continued, but as an internet-only radio station.

WHAT flipped formats to an adult standards "Martini Lounge" format on August 31, 2007, beginning with a month of Frank Sinatra's music. According to their website The All-Sinatra format aired throughout the month of September. After September 30, the station started an adult standards format featuring artists including Michael Bublé, Harry Connick, Jr., Diana Krall and their format predecessors like Tony Bennett and Peggy Lee. Many have considered it the successor to WPEN's format from 1979 to 2004, even hiring former station D.J.s like Bob Craig and Mike Bowe. On November 17, 2008, WHAT dropped the "Martini Lounge Radio" branding but continued with a similar format.

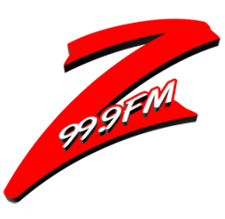
Logo as "Z99.9"

On August 1, 2011, WHAT ceased broadcasting without any announcement, leading to speculation that the station had been sold. One month later, on September 12, 2011 at 12 p.m., WHAT changed their format to Spanish-language music, branded as "El Zol 1340 AM". On September 3, 2018, the station rebranded itself as "Z99.9".

On March 19, 2020, WHAT was sold to investor Matthew Braccili and programmer Victor Martinez's VM Broadcasting LLC, and rebranded as "La Kalle 99.9".

On September 24, 2026, WHAT was sold to Sabatino Cupelli's Philly Radio, Inc. and rebranded as "Groovin' 99.9." WHAT officially changed their format to rhythmic oldies, after running it on a local marketing agreement (LMA) the month prior.
