= WCUS =

Country music radio station in Philadelphia

- Philadelphia, Pennsylvania; United States
- Broadcast area: Philadelphia metropolitan area
- Frequency: 96.5 MHz (HD Radio)
- Branding: US 96.5

Programming
- Language: English
- Format: Country
- Subchannels: HD2: Channel Q
- Affiliations: Premiere Networks

Ownership
- Owner: Audacy, Inc.; (Audacy License, LLC)
- Sister stations: KYW; WBEB; WIP-FM; WOGL; WPHI-FM; WPHT

History
- First air date: 1945
- Former call signs: WHAT-FM (1945–1968); WWDB (1968–1998); WWDB-FM (1998–2000); WPTP (2000–2003); WLDW (2003–2004); WRDW-FM (2004–2015); WZMP (2015–2017); WTDY-FM (2017-2026)
- Former frequencies: 103.5 MHz (1945–1947) (CP); 105.3 MHz (1947–1958)
- Call sign meaning: to match with "US" branding

Technical information
- Licensing authority: FCC
- Facility ID: 51434
- Class: B
- ERP: 9,600 watts (analog); 460 watts (digital)
- HAAT: 337.8 meters (1,108 ft)
- Transmitter coordinates: 40°2′30.4″N 75°14′9.6″W

Links
- Public license information: Public file; LMS
- Webcast: Listen live (via Audacy)
- Website: www.audacy.com/us965

WCUS (96.5 MHz) is a commercial radio station in Philadelphia, Pennsylvania. The station is owned by Audacy, Inc. and broadcasts a country music format. It brands as "US 96.5".

WCUS's studios are co-located with located within Audacy's corporate headquarters in Center City, Philadelphia, while its transmitter is situated off Domino Lane in the Roxborough section of Philadelphia, a site where other local FM and TV towers are located.

== History ==
=== 1945-1958: Early years ===
Independence Broadcasting Company, the owners of WHAT (1340 AM), applied to the Federal Communications Commission (FCC) for a construction permit for a new FM station on 103.5 MHz on October 5, 1945. The FCC granted the permit on July 10, 1947, while reassigning the station to 105.3 MHz. The FCC granted permission on December 2, 1948, for the station to begin broadcasting, by which time it had been assigned the WHAT-FM call sign.

In 1956, a young disc jockey known as Sid Mark took the airwaves for the first time in Philadelphia on WHAT-AM-FM, beginning a multi-decade career.

On July 24, 1957, Independence Broadcasting applied to the FCC for a construction permit to change the station's frequency to 96.5 MHz. The FCC granted the permit on October 30, 1957, followed by a new license effective September 26, 1958.

=== 1958-1975: Jazz ===
WHAT-FM became a full-time jazz station in 1958, the first of its kind on the FM dial. On November 18, 1968, the call sign was changed to WWDB, referring to the brother and sister owners of the station, William and Dolly Banks. In the early 1970s, WWDB experimented with playing adult contemporary music, but eventually went back to jazz.

=== 1975-2000: Talk ===
In 1975, the station's format was changed to all talk, making WWDB the first full-time talk station in the United States that was exclusively on the FM dial. On-air talk personalities included Irv Homer, Bernie McCain, Frank Ford, Phil Valentine, Tom Marr, and Bernie Herman. The station called itself "WWDB, The Talk Station". Originally, the station carried no syndicated shows, but came to air the syndicated Rush Limbaugh Show in the early 1990s. Nearly all twenty-four hours a day of talk radio programming with local and national news updates, came from the WWDB programming staff. Meanwhile, WHAT continued on as one of Philadelphia's radio stations aimed at the local African-American community.

After her brother William died in 1979, Dolly Banks took over as general manager. William Banks had no children, so several distant relatives filed lawsuits, fighting for ownership of twin stations WWDB/WHAT. In 1985, Dolly Banks retired after the African-American employees of sister station WHAT, along with the Black Media Caucus in Washington, D.C., sued the estate, receiving millions of dollars and forcing an estate sale of WWDB. The sale, which was overseen by the U.S. Federal Communications Commission (FCC), required the stations to be sold to a Black owner. WWDB was sold to Ragan Henry, a Black Philadelphia attorney, for an undervalued amount of $6 million. Henry's law firm had worked for the Banks family. Irv Homer had to testify before the FCC.

After a few months of ownership, in 1986, Regan Henry flipped WWDB, selling it to the decidedly not Black Charles Schwartz, who ran it under the name of Panache Broadcasting. Ten years later, Mercury Broadcasting purchased WWDB for $48 million.

After having been nearly 100% local programming, WWDB under Mercury ownership, added more nationally syndicated personalities such as Rush Limbaugh and Dr. Laura.

=== 2000-2003: 1980s hits ===
Beasley Broadcasting of Florida purchased WWDB for $65 million from Mercury Broadcasting in 1997. At first, Beasley said that the talk format would continue, but the high salaries earned by the veteran talk hosts became an expense the new owners did not want to pay. To earn extra money, the station began airing extended infomercials. After lawsuits filed by the Gay Alliance of Philadelphia, Beasley decided to change the format with no notice given ahead of time. On November 3, 2000, Beasley registered the new call sign WPTP for the station. At 9 a.m. on November 6, the day before the U.S. Presidential Election, the station began stunting with Microsoft Mary's computer-generated voice counting down to 5 p.m. that day.

At that time, WWDB's format was changed to 1980s hits, branded as "96-5 The Point". The first song was "Don't You (Forget About Me)" by Simple Minds. The buyout of the WWDB hosts' contracts is said to have cost Beasley $5 million. The WPTP call sign went into effect on November 22, 2000. Due to low ratings, WPTP shifted to hot adult contemporary in early 2003. The format tweak did little to improve the station's ratings. (WPTP's closest rival with the format, WMWX, also had low ratings during this time.)

=== 2003-2015: Rhythmic Contemporary ===
On November 17, 2003, at 7:50 am, WPTP began stunting with Christmas music as "Snowy 96.5". At 5 p.m. that day, after a bit with then-morning host Paul Barsky, WPTP changed to rhythmic contemporary as "Wild 96.5", and changed call signs to WLDW. The station launched with "Get Low" by Lil Jon & the East Side Boyz; however, Clear Channel Communications (now iHeartMedia), owners of the copyrighted "Wild" moniker, threatened Beasley with a lawsuit for copyright infringement. To avoid this, in February 2004, WLDW became "Wired 96.5" and the call sign changed to WRDW-FM. (The -FM suffix was necessary because of the existence of AM station WRDW in Augusta, Georgia, which was also owned by Beasley.)

During its tenure as "Wired", the station would occasionally shift back and forth between Rhythmic and Mainstream Top 40, while still placing an emphasis on Rhythmic and Dance currents/recurrents, and avoiding most rock-leaning product.

On October 2, 2014, Beasley Broadcast Group announced that it would trade five radio stations located in Miami and Philadelphia (including WRDW-FM) to CBS Radio in exchange for 14 stations located in Tampa and Charlotte. Because CBS already owned two AM stations in Philadelphia, Beasley would acquire WIP, which today is WTEL. The swap was completed on December 1, 2014. Shortly after the trade was consummated, WRDW-FM shifted to a more Mainstream Top 40 direction, though still favoring Rhythmic and Dance currents/recurrents.

=== 2015-2017: Top 40 ===
During and after the trade, rumors abounded online that CBS would flip the station to all-news, this time as a simulcast of KYW. This was partially due to WRDW-FM's continued low ratings; in the February 2015 Philadelphia PPM ratings report, WRDW-FM held a 2.4 share of the market, as compared to direct competitor WIOQ's 4.1 share. In the spring of 2015, CBS registered domain names towards a possible rebranding as "96.5 AMP Radio", joining similar stations in New York, Detroit, Boston, Orlando and Los Angeles with the "AMP" name. On April 5, 2015, WRDW-FM began running without airstaff and promoting a significant change using the hashtag #965Friday5PM to come at 5 p.m. on April 10. At that time, after playing "Motownphilly" by Boyz II Men, the rebrand to "AMP Radio" took place. The first song on "AMP" was "Get Low" by Dillon Francis and DJ Snake. The changeover also resulted in morning host Chunky and afternoon host/program director Buster being released. On April 20, 2015, WRDW-FM changed its call sign to WZMP to match the "AMP" moniker.

During its tenure as "AMP", the station's ratings improved, mostly to a low to mid-3 share of the market, but did not dethrone WIOQ. In the December 2016 Philadelphia PPM ratings report, WZMP held a 3.0 share as compared to WIOQ's 3.6 share. Around Christmas of 2016, morning host Jason Cage and afternoon host Mike Adam left the station.

=== 2017-2018: Adult contemporary ===
WTDY-FM's first logo from January 5, 2017, to March 16, 2018

On January 5, 2017, at 10 am, after playing "Time of Our Lives" by Pitbull, WZMP flipped to mainstream adult contemporary as Today's 96.5, launching with "Raise Your Glass" by Doylestown native P!nk. At launch, the new format would compete against market leader WBEB, as well as hot-AC formatted WISX. (WISX suffered low ratings against the newly formatted WZMP later in the year, leading WISX to make a format switch to rhythmic AC five months later.) On January 13, 2017, WZMP changed its call sign to WTDY-FM to better match the new format.

On February 2, 2017, CBS announced that it would merge its radio division (which included WTDY-FM) with Bala Cynwyd-based Entercom. The merger was approved on November 9, 2017, and was consummated on the 17th.

=== 2018–2026: Hot AC; return to CHR, and return to Hot AC ===
On March 16, 2018, the station rebranded as 96.5 TDY, shifting to a hot adult contemporary format with a larger emphasis on current music. The switch also restored a hot AC-formatted station to the market for the first time since WISX's aforementioned flip, and returned the format to the 96.5 frequency since the flip to rhythmic in 2003.

On November 12, 2018, WTDY-FM launched a new morning show, Coop & Casey in the Morning, hosted by Sean 'Coop' Tabler and Casey Reed. The station also shifted back to a Top 40/CHR format, a move that followed Entercom's acquisition of former AC competitor WBEB.

In March 2020, in response to the COVID-19 pandemic and cost-cutting measures, Casey Reed of Coop & Casey in the Morning was let go, with longtime radio and morning show host Sean "Coop" Tabler remaining.

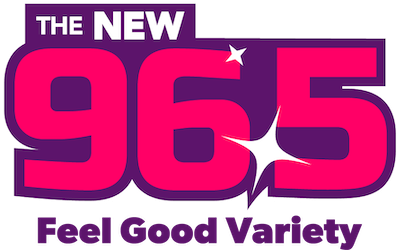
Logo as "The New 96.5", 2023-26

For the weekend of May 11 through 15, 2023, the station temporarily rebranded as "96.5 TAY" (pronounced "Ninety-Swift-Five T-A-Y"), playing only music by Taylor Swift ahead of her Eras Tour stopping in Philadelphia for that period, promoting that the station would broadcast on site from her performances at Lincoln Financial Field. WTDY-FM also began running sweepers announcing that at 9 a.m. on May 15, "96.5 will begin a new era." At that date and time, WTDY-FM shifted back to hot adult contemporary and re-branded as "The New 96.5", with "I'm Good (Blue)" by David Guetta and Bebe Rexha being the first song played.

=== 2026-present: Country ===
On October 19, 2026, at 12pm, after signing off the "New" format with "Good Riddance (Time of Your Life)" by Green Day, followed by a commercial break, WTDY flipped to country music as "US 96.5", now competing against former sister station WXTU for the country audience in Philadelphia. The first song on "US" was "I Had Some Help" by Morgan Wallen and Post Malone. The format launched commercial free for its first 5 days, promptly launching a pre-set airstaff on the following Monday, the 26th, consisting of a yet-unannounced morning show, Sean "Coop" Tabler of sister station WOGL co-shifting in afternoons, and national Audacy shows Rob & Holly evenings and Mo & StyckMan overnights. The station filed to change call letters to WCUS to match the branding, with the move receiving FCC official approval and taking effect alongside the other changes on the 26th. This format flip leaves the Philadelphia market without a hot adult contemporary station.

== HD Radio ==
=== WTDY-FM HD2 ===
In 2007, WRDW added an HD2 subchannel, carrying non-stop dance music under the moniker "Hot Wired". The music and imaging was similar to co-owned Miami rhythmic station WPOW's HD2 channel, now defunct. In 2012, the format changed to foreign language programming as "VDC Radio". In May 2013, Hot Wired returned, while VDC moved to WXTU-HD3. "Hot Wired" was later renamed "WirEDM", referring to Electronic Dance Music. In 2015, the WirEDM name was phased out with the rebranding to AMP Radio, with the HD2 subchannel rebranding as "Pulse". The format aired mainly dance music from 2005 to 2012 with a few current songs in the mix. In November 2017, the HD2 format flipped to acoustic rock with a few alternative songs mixed in as "Alt 96.5 HD2". Roughly a year later, the format was shifted to a more traditional alternative rock playlist. The HD3 format soon moved over to HD2.

=== WTDY-FM HD3 ===
In September 2015, WTDY-HD3 aired Popecast, a temporary station produced by KYW to cover Pope Francis's visit to North America (which concluded in Philadelphia).

In August 2019, WTDY-HD3 began airing programming from "Channel Q", Entercom's Talk/EDM service for the LGBTQ community. Previously, it aired a travelers' information loop as "Hear Philly". The HD3 subchannel has moved to HD2 and has since been turned off.
