= Herb Clarke (weatherman) =

TV meteorologist (1927–2012)

Herbert Spencer Clarke (July 10, 1927 – January 8, 2012) was an American weatherman and television journalist. Clarke spent thirty-nine years, from 1958 to 1997, as a reporter for WCAU-TV in Philadelphia. Under Clarke, WCAU became the first local television station in the Philadelphia media market to use radar in its weather coverage, beginning in 1982.

Clarke was born in 1927 in Eden, North Carolina, and graduated from Draper (now Eden) High School in 1944. He was in the United States Navy from 1944 to 1946 and served on the USS Hancock (CV-19) in the South Pacific Ocean. In 1946, he attended Pfeiffer University in North Carolina. He received a bachelor's degree in journalism from Bowling Green State University. He began working in broadcasting in 1948 in Eden, North Carolina. Clarke then worked as a radio and television reporter at WRVA-TV in Richmond, Virginia (now WWBT) before joining WCAU-TV in 1958.

Clarke joined the staff of WCAU on November 24, 1958, as an on-air weatherman and reporter, using the nickname "Atlantic Weatherman, as Atlantic Richfield Company was his sponsor." Clarke was hired to replace Ed McMahon who relocated to New York to begin his association with Johnny Carson. Though most known for weather reports, Clarke also co-hosted Philadelphia regional coverage of events, such as the Mummers Parade, and previously anchored WCAU's Sunday night news. He was also assigned the station's science and health stories as well. WCAU remained a CBS affiliate until 1995, when it switched affiliations to NBC.

Clarke retired from WCAU in 1997. For the next few years, he did gardening reports for KYW (AM) Newsradio 1060. He also served as the President of the Broadcast Pioneers of Philadelphia from 1988 and 1989. Clarke was named the Broadcast Pioneers of Philadelphia's Person of the Year in 1991 and was inducted into their Hall of Fame in 1994. In 2007, Clarke was a recipient of the National Academy of Television Arts and Sciences (NATAS) Governor's Award.

Herb Clarke died on January 8, 2012, at the Beaumont assisted living facility in Bryn Mawr, Pennsylvania, of complications from Alzheimer's disease at the age of 84.

Clarke was survived by his wife, Barbara Cawthorne Clarke, whom he had been married to for 56 years; daughter, Ann Million; two sons, John and Robert; and three grandchildren. Clarke and his wife had been long-term residents of Haverford, Pennsylvania, before moving to the Beaumont retirement community in 2004. His funeral was held at the Bryn Mawr Presbyterian Church.
