= WCAU =

Television station in Philadelphia

- Philadelphia, Pennsylvania; United States
- Channels: Digital: 28 (UHF), shared with WWSI; Virtual: 10
- Branding: NBC10

Programming
- Affiliations: 10.1: NBC; for others, see § Technical information and subchannels

Ownership
- Owner: NBC Owned Television Stations; (NBC Telemundo License LLC)
- Sister stations: WWSI; NBC Sports Philadelphia

History
- Founded: September 1946
- First air date: May 23, 1948
- Former call signs: WPEN-TV (CP, 1946–1947); WCAU-TV (1947–1995)
- Former channel numbers: Analog: 10 (VHF, 1948–2009); Digital: 67 (UHF, 1998–2009), 34 (UHF, 2009–2019)
- Former affiliations: CBS (1948–1995)
- Call sign meaning: Taken from WCAU radio, randomly assigned

Technical information
- Licensing authority: FCC
- Facility ID: 63153
- ERP: 745 kW
- HAAT: 399.8 m (1,312 ft)
- Transmitter coordinates: 40°2′30.1″N 75°14′10.1″W

Links
- Public license information: Public file; LMS
- Website: www.nbcphiladelphia.com

WCAU (channel 10) is a television station in Philadelphia, Pennsylvania, United States, serving the Delaware Valley. It is owned and operated by the NBC television network through its NBC Owned Television Stations division.

Under common ownership with Mount Laurel, New Jersey–licensed Telemundo outlet WWSI (channel 62) and regional sports network NBC Sports Philadelphia, both WCAU and WWSI share studios in the Comcast Technology Center on Arch Street in Center City, with some operations remaining at their former main studio at the corner of City Avenue and Monument Road in Bala Cynwyd. The stations broadcast from the same transmitter in the Roxborough section of Philadelphia.

== History ==
=== As a CBS station (1946–January 1995) ===
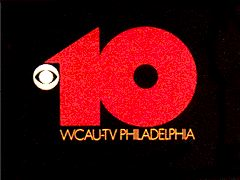
WCAU-TV ident from 1973 to 1976; the "10" survived with only minor changes until 1995.

In 1946, the Philadelphia Evening Bulletin secured a construction permit for channel 10, naming its proposed station WPEN-TV after the newspaper's WPEN radio stations (950 AM), now WKDN, and 98.1 FM, later WCAU-FM and now WOGL. The picture changed dramatically in 1947, when The Philadelphia Record folded.

The Bulletin inherited the Record's "goodwill", along with the rights to buy the radio station WCAU (1210 AM, now WPHT) and the original WCAU-FM (102.9 FM, now WMGK) from their longtime owners, brothers Isaac and Leon Levy. The Bulletin sold the less-powerful WPEN and WCAU-FM, with the latter being renamed WPEN-FM; it is now WMGK. The Bulletin kept its FM station, renaming it WCAU-FM to match its new AM sister. The newspaper also kept its construction permit for channel 10, renaming it WCAU-TV.

WCAU-TV went on the air March 1, 1948, as Philadelphia's third television station with an initial test pattern on Channel 10. It carried its first CBS network show on a "sneak preview" basis on March 3, but the official opening of the station was not until May 23, 1948. It secured an affiliation with CBS through the influence of the Levy brothers, who continued to work for the newspaper as consultants. WCAU radio had been one of CBS' original 16 affiliates when the network launched in 1927. A year later, the Levy brothers persuaded their brother-in-law, William S. Paley, to buy the struggling network. The Levy brothers were shareholders and directors at CBS for many years. Due to this long relationship, channel 10 signed on as CBS's third television affiliate.

In the late 1950s, the Federal Communications Commission (FCC) collapsed northern Delaware, South Jersey, and the Lehigh Valley into the Philadelphia market. The Bulletin realized that channel 10's original tower, atop the PSFS Building in Center City, was not nearly strong enough to serve this larger viewing area. In 1957, WCAU-TV moved to a new 1,200-foot (366 m) tower in Roxborough, which added most of Delaware, the Jersey Shore and the Lehigh Valley to its city-grade coverage.

Also in 1957, the Bulletin formed a limited partnership with the Megargee family, owner of CBS affiliate WGBI-TV (channel 22) in Scranton. As part of the deal, channel 22's call letters were changed to WDAU-TV (WDAU's call letters were changed again to WYOU in 1986). Soon afterward, the FCC ruled that the Bulletin could not keep both stations due to a large signal overlap in the Lehigh Valley. Although the Bulletin had only bought a minority stake in channel 22, the FCC ruled that this stake was so large that the two stations were effectively a duopoly. The Bulletin could not afford to get a waiver to keep both stations, so it opted to keep its stake in WDAU-TV and sell the WCAU stations to CBS. CBS had to seek a waiver to buy the WCAU stations, as the signals of WCAU's AM and television stations overlapped with those of WCBS radio and WCBS-TV in New York City (in the case of the AM outlets, both were clear-channel stations; the FCC at the time usually did not allow common ownership of clear-channel stations with overlapping nighttime coverage areas). However, in its application for a waiver, CBS cited NBC's then-ownership of WRCV-TV in Philadelphia (channel 3, now KYW-TV) and WRCA-TV in New York City. The FCC readily granted the waiver, and CBS took control in 1958.

=== Switch from CBS to NBC (1994–January 1995) ===
WCAU's boxed 10 logo was adopted upon its new affiliation with NBC in September 1995, and its use lasted until February 2012.

In July 1994, CBS entered into a long-term affiliation agreement with Westinghouse (Group W) Broadcasting, owners of Philadelphia's longtime NBC affiliate, KYW-TV, and its sister stations in Baltimore (WJZ-TV) and Boston (WBZ-TV). Westinghouse converted all three of those stations into CBS affiliates. CBS was reluctant to include KYW-TV in the deal since it had been a very distant third in the Philadelphia ratings for more than a decade. In contrast, WCAU was a solid runner-up to ABC-owned station WPVI-TV (channel 6). Ultimately, CBS decided to affiliate with channel 3 and sell channel 10, ending a 47-year relationship (including 37 years of ownership) with the station.

NBC and New World Communications then emerged as the leading bidders for WCAU. NBC had wanted to own a station in Philadelphia for many years; for most of the broadcasting era, Philadelphia was the largest market where NBC did not own a station. It briefly succeeded in 1956, when it extorted Westinghouse into exchanging channel 3 (then called WPTZ-TV) and KYW radio for NBC's Cleveland stations, WTAM-AM-FM and WNBK television. However, after Westinghouse complained, the FCC and the U.S. Justice Department nullified the swap in June 1965. During the early 1990s, Bob Wright, president and CEO of NBC, had the network's ownership of Philadelphia and some of the nation's other largest markets as part of the strategic plan to keep NBC as the highest-rated network.

New World got into the bidding because it had just signed a multi-year affiliation deal with Fox, and intended to make WCAU a Fox station had it emerged as channel 10's owner. Fox's affiliate in Philadelphia, WTXF-TV, was about to become an affiliate of the United Paramount Network (UPN), which was to be programmed mostly by WTXF's owner, Paramount Stations Group. New World found the chance to give Fox a VHF station in the nation's fourth-largest market too much to resist, but NBC wanted a VHF station in the market. Had WCAU become a Fox station, it would have retained its status as the "home" station of the NFL's Philadelphia Eagles. The station had carried Eagles games since 1950, and had carried the majority of Eagles games since CBS won the rights to NFL games in 1956. Indeed, Fox had cut its affiliation deal with New World because it had recently won the rights to the National Football Conference, where the Eagles play; New World owned a large number of CBS affiliates. Fox jumped into the bidding as well in case New World's bid fell through.

However, Viacom, which bought Paramount in mid-1994, opted instead to sell WTXF-TV to Fox, making WTXF-TV a Fox O&O—and hence the new "home" of the Eagles. This led New World to pull out of the bidding war for WCAU as well, effectively handing channel 10 to NBC, achieving the network's goal in owning a station in Philadelphia, even though they owned the station they did not want to own in the first place. This also kept WCAU co-owned with WMAQ-TV in Chicago and network flagships WNBC in New York and KNBC in Los Angeles—but for the first time, WCAU would also be co-owned with WRC-TV in Washington, D.C., achieving another goal of NBC to own a continuous East Coast power corridor from New York to Washington.

=== As an NBC-owned station (January 1995–present) ===
While KYW-TV's sister stations in Boston and Baltimore switched to CBS in January 1995, the swap was delayed in Philadelphia when CBS discovered that an outright sale of channel 10 would have forced it to pay capital gains taxes on the proceeds from the deal. To solve this problem, CBS, NBC and Group W entered into a complex ownership and affiliation deal in November 1994. To make the deal for WCAU an even trade, NBC transferred KCNC-TV in Denver and KUTV in Salt Lake City (a station that NBC had only acquired earlier that year) to CBS in exchange; additionally, the NBC and CBS stations in Miami traded broadcasting facilities, with CBS moving to the stronger of the two signals. CBS then traded controlling interest in KCNC and KUTV to Group W in return for a minority stake in KYW-TV. The deal officially took effect on September 10, 1995. Group W's parent, the Westinghouse Electric Corporation, purchased CBS two months later, making CBS' Philadelphia radio stations sisters to WCAU-AM/WPHT's longtime rival, KYW radio. The last CBS network program to air on channel 10 was a repeat of Walker, Texas Ranger, which began at 10 p.m. on September 9, 1995.

Although the radio stations had dropped the WCAU calls some years before, NBC dropped the -TV suffix from channel 10's callsign soon after it assumed control.

In January 2011, the Philadelphia-based cable and media company Comcast acquired a 51% majority stake in WCAU's parent company, by then known as NBC Universal, which effectively makes the station locally owned. Comcast bought the other 49% in early 2013.

In March 2013, NBCUniversal announced that it would buy Telemundo affiliate WWSI from ZGS Communications for $20 million, giving WCAU a duopoly partner, as with several other NBC O&Os. The sale was completed on June 2 of that year. In August 2012, NBC Owned Stations Group rebranded channel 10, to reflect the Look F package.

On February 14, 2014, WCAU, along with nearby NBC affiliate WBAL-TV in Baltimore, began to be shown on Comcast cable systems in the Susquehanna Valley after WGAL, the NBC affiliate in that market, was knocked off the air after a portion of the roof at the station's Columbia Avenue studio facility collapsed due to heavy accumulations of snow and ice caused by a winter storm that moved through the Eastern United States earlier that week.

On April 16, 2014, WMGM-TV (channel 40), the NBC affiliate in nearby Atlantic City, announced that the station would drop its NBC affiliation and shut down its news operation on January 1, 2015, presumably due to WCAU claiming market exclusivity (Atlantic City is part of the Philadelphia market). Following an hour-long documentary focusing on the station's history and staff entitled NewsCenter 40: The Stories Behind the Station, WMGM-TV then began carrying programs from the Soul of the South network, while WCAU became the sole NBC affiliate in the market. WMGM-TV was sold to Univision Communications in 2017 and is now a primary True Crime Network affiliate; it also relays sister station and Univision network O&O WUVP-DT (channel 65) on its third digital subchannel.

== Studios ==
- WCAU Studios
- U.S. National Register of Historic Places
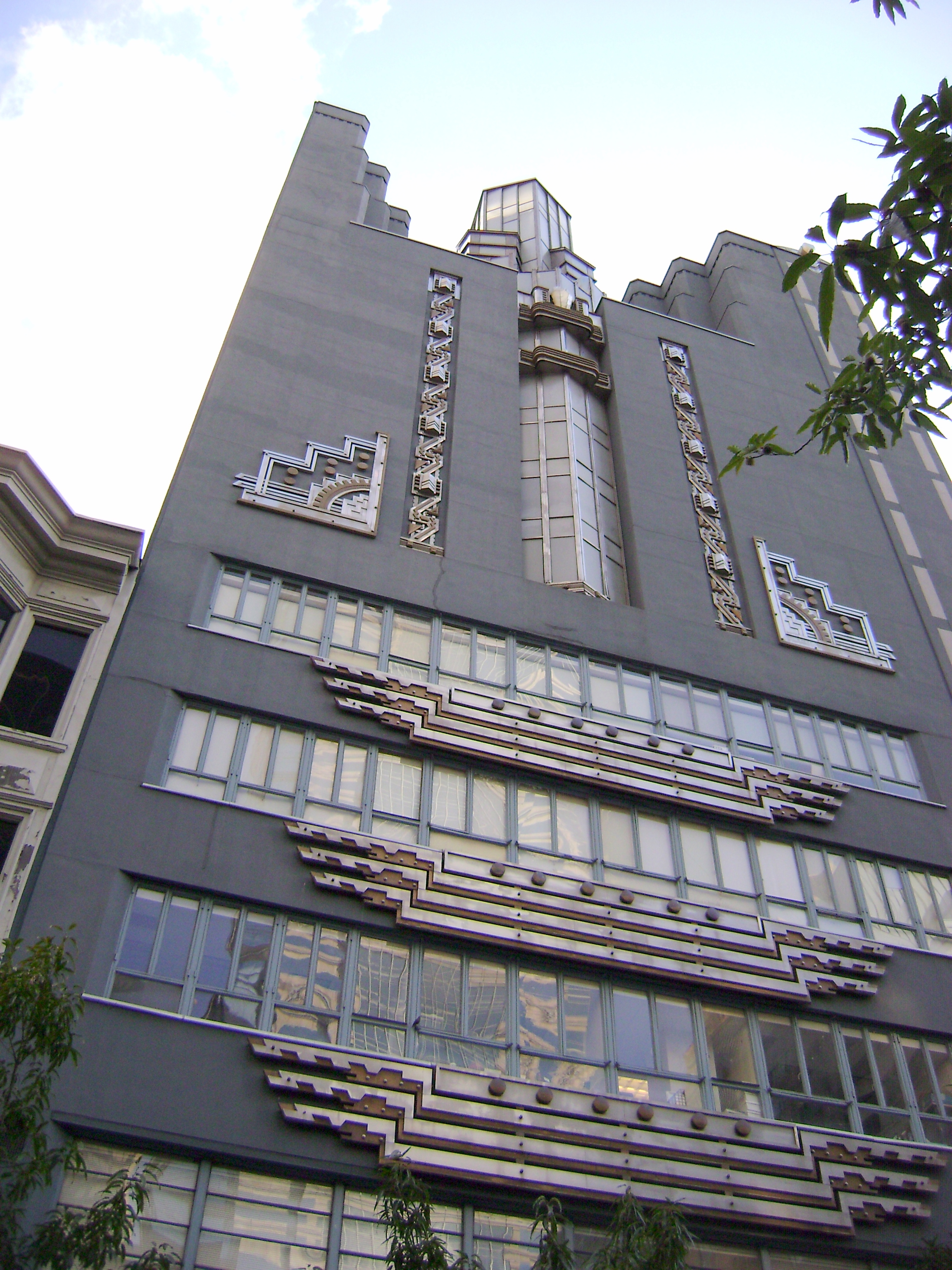
- In 1983, the original studio at 1622 Chestnut Street was added to the U.S. National Register of Historic Places

- Location within Pennsylvania Location within the United States
- Location: 1622 Chestnut St., Philadelphia, Pennsylvania
- Coordinates: 39°57′04″N 75°10′05″W
- Built: 1931
- Architects: Harry Sternfeld; Multiple
- Architectural style: Modern Movement, Art Deco
- NRHP reference No.: 83002281
- Added to NRHP: January 27, 1983

Channel 10 was originally located at 1622 Chestnut Street in Center City along with its sister radio stations. The building, which was listed on the National Register of Historic Places in 1983, now houses Institute of Contemporary Art. In 1952, WCAU-AM-FM-TV moved to a new facility in the Main Line suburb of Bala Cynwyd. The studio, located on Monument Road at City Avenue, was a state-of-the-art television center, and the first building in the nation to be constructed specifically for mainly television productions, though WCAU's radio stations were also based out of the facility until the 1995 sale to NBC.

On January 16, 2014, it was announced that WCAU and sister station WWSI would move to the then-under-construction Comcast Technology Center on Arch Street in Center City, which was built by NBC parent Comcast. This 59-story building became the tallest building in Philadelphia, and is now recognized as the tallest building in the United States outside of New York and Chicago. After several weeks of off-air tests, WCAU and WWSI officially moved all on-air operations to the new facility on October 21, 2018. However, some technical and other operations, and the base and staging for the station's live news vehicles, will remain in Bala Cynwyd for the time being.

== Programming ==
From 1965 to 1986, WCAU-TV was the only network-owned station in Philadelphia. As such, it was the only station in the city that did not heavily or moderately preempt network programming. Channel 10 did, however, run an hour of Saturday morning cartoons during the 7 a.m. hour on a one-week delay to run the hour-long locally produced children's program, The Gene London Show, which ended in 1977. Beginning in 1978, WCAU-TV began preempting an hour of Sunday morning cartoon reruns and in the beginning of 1979 the station preempted an hour of the Saturday morning cartoons. By 1980, the station was running the entire Saturday morning cartoon lineup again and by early in 1981, the Sunday morning hour of children's programs was brought back.

=== Wawa Welcome America ===
In July 2016, Comcast announced that they would take over as presenting sponsor of the Wawa Welcome America 4th of July festivities, particularly the Philly July 4 Jam and Grand Finale Fireworks; WCAU and WWSI assumed the local broadcast duties beginning in 2016, thus ending 32 years of broadcast rights with ABC owned-and-operated WPVI, while the Philly July 4 Jam concert was also broadcast nationally on VH1. By airing the event, the station preempts the live national NBC telecast of the Macy's 4th of July Fireworks from New York City, though it carries the condensed replay immediately after both ceremonies end.

=== Sports programming ===
Since Comcast acquired the station's parent NBCUniversal in 2011, WCAU has aired Philadelphia's major sports teams in many years. Because of those commitments to air these major sports teams, they reschedule NBC network programs preempted on the station. WCAU, as both a CBS and NBC station, has also aired Philadelphia's pro sports teams through their network coverage as well.

==== Philadelphia Phillies ====
On January 2, 2014, Comcast and the Philadelphia Phillies announced a 25-year, $2.5 billion TV contract, including WCAU and Comcast SportsNet Philadelphia (now NBC Sports Philadelphia); although it averaged $100 million a year, it was structured to begin below the average and end above it. As part of its 25-year TV contract, WCAU took over free-to-air broadcast rights for Phillies baseball games from then-MyNetworkTV affiliate WPHL-TV beginning in the 2014 season, including its Opening Day game and select games simulcast with NBC Sports Philadelphia. Since 2026, WCAU also airs any Phillies games selected for NBC's national Sunday Night Baseball package. As a CBS station, WCAU aired select Phillies games as part of CBS' broadcast contract with Major League Baseball from 1990 to 1993, including the 1993 World Series, in which the Phillies lost to the Toronto Blue Jays.

==== Philadelphia Eagles ====
Philadelphia Eagles games primarily aired on Channel 10 back when it was a CBS station and that network carried the National Football Conference, a relationship that began in 1956 when CBS took on the broadcast rights to the pre-merger National Football League. That arrangement lasted until 1994, when Fox acquired the NFC contract and with it, the Eagles games to WTXF. After being traded to NBC, only select games where the Eagles hosted an American Football Conference opponent would air on WCAU from 1995 to 1997, when CBS regained the NFL. Since 2006, Eagles games broadcast nationally by NBC Sports have aired on WCAU, mostly Sunday Night Football contests but also Super Bowl LII, which saw the Eagles clinch their first NFL championship in the modern Super Bowl era.

In the summer of 2015, Comcast and the Eagles announced a new TV contract; WCAU began airing the preseason games in the 2015 season after ending its contract with ABC owned-and-operated station WPVI in the 2014 season. Pre-season games are sub-licensed to other stations during Olympic years.

==== Philadelphia Flyers ====
WCAU has free-to-air rights to the Philadelphia Flyers hockey games beginning with the 2017–18 season with NBC Sports Philadelphia. Flyers games were also broadcast nationally on the station through its broadcast package of the National Hockey League until the contract's expiration at the end of the 2020–21 season, including the team's appearance in the 2010 Stanley Cup Finals.

==== Philadelphia 76ers ====
Beginning in the 2017–18 season, WCAU began displaying its in-court advertisements during all of the Philadelphia 76ers NBA franchise home games held at the Wells Fargo Center (now Xfinity Mobile Arena); the home games of the 76ers are currently broadcast on its sister regional sports network NBC Sports Philadelphia. Prior to the launch of the station's in-court advertisement campaign, the station carried these 76ers games as part of the network's broadcasting package of the NBA from 1995 until 2002 and since 2025 (including the team's appearance in the 2001 NBA Finals). During its run as a CBS station, all 76ers games that were broadcast as part of that network's NBA broadcast contract from 1973 to 1990 aired on channel 10, including the team's victory in the 1983 NBA Finals.

==== Broad Street Run ====
In 2015, WCAU assumed the local English broadcast rights of the Blue Cross Broad Street Run, held every first Sunday of May, taking over from ABC O&O WPVI after the 36th annual event in 2014.

=== News operation ===
WCAU presently broadcasts 41 hours, 20 minutes of locally produced newscasts each week (with 6 hours, 34 minutes each weekday; four hours on Saturdays and 4 1/2 hours on Sundays). News has been produced at WCAU from when the station went on the air on in 1948. Charles Shaw, who had worked with Edward R. Murrow as a CBS correspondent in London during World War II, was the station's news director from 1948 until he left the station in the early 1960s. John Facenda, who later gained fame as the voice of NFL Films, was the station's main anchorman from shortly after it signed on until 1973. At the time he retired, he had been a main anchor longer than anyone in Philadelphia; he has since been passed by WPVI's Jim Gardner.

Soon after joining the station, Facenda sold the Bulletin on the idea of a local 11 p.m. newscast—the first in the country. It aired for the first time on September 8. In 1950, WCAU became the first station with a four-man news team. The 6 p.m. newscast was anchored by Facenda, with Philadelphia radio legend Phil Sheridan handling weather, Jack Whitaker on sports and Ed McMahon as announcer. In 1965, channel 10 introduced the "Big News" format from Los Angeles sister station KNXT (now KCBS-TV).

The station's news operation was the ratings leader in Philadelphia for most of the time from the late 1940s until the 1960s, when it was surpassed by KYW-TV's Eyewitness News. The station then remained a strong second until the 1970s, when WPVI-TV's Action News bumped channel 10 down to third place. WCAU struggled through the late 1970s while most of its CBS sister stations dominated the ratings, but has since recovered and has been a solid runner-up to longtime leader WPVI for over a quarter century. WCAU managed to pass WPVI in the 5 p.m. time slot for a time in the early 1980s with its original Live at 5, anchored by Larry Kane and Deborah Knapp (now at KENS in San Antonio). In 2001, WCAU made national news when its 11 p.m. newscast (anchored by Larry Mendte and Renee Chenault-Fattah) knocked WPVI from the top spot in the local news ratings for the first time in decades. Since 2003, WCAU has had to fend off a spirited challenge from a resurgent KYW-TV for second place in the Philadelphia ratings; Channel 3's resurgence was fueled in part by luring Mendte away from channel 10.

WCAU used music based on "Channel 2 News", written by Dick Marx for WBBM-TV in Chicago (the de facto official music for CBS' O&O stations) and variations on it from 1982 until the 11 p.m. newscast on September 9, 1995, hours before the switch to NBC. When Facenda retired and The Newsroom went on-air with Jack Jones and Mike Tuck, WCAU used theme music produced in Philadelphia by deLise & Miller. It used Marx's original 1975 version from 1982 to 1987, a synthesized version produced by a local composer during the 1987–88 season and the "Palmer News Package" composed by Shelly Palmer from 1988 to 1995. KYW-TV has used variants on this theme in recent years.

Shortly after CBS agreed to sell the station to NBC in the fall of 1994, WCAU began to slowly remove CBS references from the station's branding; in January 1995, the longtime moniker of Channel 10 News was eliminated in favor of NewsCenter 10, which coincided with the debut of a reconstructed newsroom facility. During this time, new cuts of the Palmer News Package were used alongside an aqua blue and purple graphical package, and a black-and-white logo with no references to any network affiliation. After the sale closed, NBC changed the name to News 10, with anchors Ken Matz, Renee Chenault and reporter Siani Lee anchoring a special newscast the morning of September 10, 1995, explaining the station's new identity and the affiliation switch.

The station's news operation was renamed again, this time to NBC 10 News, beginning with the 11 p.m. newscast on September 11, 2000. On December 10, 2005, WCAU took over production of WPHL-TV (channel 17)'s nightly half-hour 10 p.m. newscast after that station shuttered its in-house news department and laid off its entire news and production staff; this new newscast was called WB 17 News at 10, Powered by NBC 10. On July 25, 2006, the program was renamed My PHL 17 News, Powered by NBC 10 to correspond with WPHL's then-pending switch to MyNetworkTV. This newscast competed with the 10 p.m. newscasts on WTXF (channel 29, which is produced in-house) and WPSG (channel 57, which is produced by KYW-TV). On September 14, 2012, WCAU produced its final edition of WPHL's newscast. The next day WPVI officially took over production and rebranded the newscast as Action News at 10 on PHL 17.

From 2001 to 2005, WPPX-TV rebroadcast some of WCAU's newscasts.

On November 13, 2008, Fox Television Stations and NBC Local Media entered into an agreement to test a system that would allow Fox-owned stations and NBC-owned stations to pool their news resources ranging from shared video to any aerial video from a helicopter. WCAU and Fox owned-and-operated station WTXF were the first stations to undertake the plan (known as a "Local News Service" agreement) as an effective way to deal with the difficulties in costs in news operations. WCAU later announced in September 2012, that it would be leaving the Local News Service agreement with WTXF and KYW-TV (which entered the agreement by 2010) and use its own helicopter. The new helicopter, dubbed "SkyForce 10", debuted on February 25, 2013.

WCAU became the fourth and last English-language television station in the Philadelphia market to begin broadcasting its local news programming in high-definition on December 10, 2008, starting with its 4 p.m. newscast. On September 12, 2011, WCAU expanded its weekday morning newscast to 4:30 am, along with the launch of a new midday newscast at 11 am, and the reduction of The 10! Show to a half-hour program. On December 6, 2011, the station announced a partnership with public broadcasting stations WHYY-FM-TV as part of a larger effort by NBCUniversal to partner with nonprofit news organizations following its acquisition by Comcast. On September 15, 2012, The 10! Show ended its run after ten years. On September 17, 2012, WCAU's midday newscast expanded to one hour. Their morning newscast starts at 4 a.m.

Former morning anchor Vai Sikahema may be the station's most recognizable current personality. A former Philadelphia Eagle, Sikahema is one of several former NFL stars who have gone on to become sports news anchors (other notable examples include Jim Hill of KCBS-TV in Los Angeles and Len Dawson of KMBC-TV in Kansas City). While Sikahema anchored the sportscasts on WCAU-TV weeknights, on-air personalities from NBC Sports Philadelphia have anchored sports on weekends in recent years, owing to Comcast owning NBC through NBCUniversal since the start of the 2010s.

In February 2014, WCAU became the second television station in Philadelphia (behind Fox O&O WTXF-TV) to expand its weekday morning newscast to three hours, with addition of a half-hour at 4 a.m.; this newscast was canceled in 2016 but revived on July 31, 2017. In conjunction with this, they switched its music to the "L.A. Groove" theme that has been in use by sister stations KNBC in Los Angeles, KNSD in San Diego, KNTV in San Francisco and WNBC in New York City (in the case of WNBC, it no longer uses "L.A. Groove" as its news theme as of 2016).

On July 11, 2016, beginning with the 4 p.m. newscast, WCAU became the seventh NBC-owned station to begin using ArtWorks' "Look N" graphics package following WNBC, WTVJ, WVIT, KXAS-TV, WMAQ-TV and WRC-TV.

On October 21, 2018, WCAU moved to their new studios within the Comcast Technology Center, beginning with the 6 p.m. newscast. The logo was also simplified to remove the redundant "NBC" text and streamline the NBC Peacock and the "10" numeral together more closely, as had been done with sister station WBTS-LD's new "10" logo upon their numerical rebranding to "NBC 10 Boston" at the start of 2018.

In August 2019, WCAU announced that the last 15 minutes of its 11 a.m. newscast would be cut in favor of their lifestyle show Philly Live beginning September 9.

In February 2020, WCAU announced a content partnership with Philadelphia-based company Entercom Communications (which in 2021 officially became known as Audacy) and its AM radio station KYW along with its sister stations WIP-FM, WTDY-FM, WOGL, WPHT and WBEB for use of WCAU's on-air talent on the radio stations; it was the second station partnership between Entercom/Audacy and NBC (following KXAS-TV and KRLD in Dallas beginning in 2018).

On February 17, 2020, WCAU added a half-hour 7 p.m. newscast on weekdays.

It was announced in July 2020 that Sikahema would be retiring from NBC10 in November of that year after a 26-year run at the station, stepping away from the anchor position but still being active around the station until fully retiring. Additionally, co-anchor Tracy Davidson would be shifting away from the morning editions to anchor the 4 p.m. and 5 p.m. newscasts alongside Jacqueline London and Jim Rosenfield respectively. It was also revealed that previous 4 p.m. and 5 p.m. anchor team Keith Jones and Erin Coleman would take over the anchoring duties for the morning show. Sikahema and Davidson's last day anchoring the broadcast was on September 17, 2020, with Jones and Coleman taking over the next day. On December 23, 2022, Jim Rosenfield left NBC10 after nine years at the station to head home to New York and pursue other opportunities.

In July 2021, WCAU testing its "Look S" graphics package in their sponsor plugs; but the new graphics package officially premiered on July 19 of the same year, beginning with the 11 a.m. newscast (sister Telemundo station WWSI also debuted the same package on that date).

On January 22, 2022, WCAU launched a new 24-hour streaming channel made exclusively for NBCUniversal's streaming service Peacock, dubbed as "NBC Philadelphia News" featuring the simulcasts and encores of the station's newscasts as well as the station's original content made for the channel. The new streaming channel comes following the announcement they would have a simultaneous rollout of streaming news channels with its sister stations in Chicago, Miami and Boston beginning on that date, with channels in New York and Los Angeles followed suit on March 17. Prior to the launch of the streaming channel, the station had a curated playlist made available on the streaming service since its April 2020 launch.

In March 2023, the station officially announced that Fred Shropshire, an anchor with WCNC-TV in Charlotte, had been hired to take over the 6, 7 and 11 p.m. anchor spots left open due to Rosenfeld's departure. However, he would not begin at the station until July 4 co-hosting the station's coverage of the Wawa Welcome America events alongside Jacqueline London and then would officially debut as London's co-anchor on July 10, a few days after his original announced debut date of June 26. In the interim period between Rosenfeld's departure and Shropshire's arrival, morning anchor Keith Jones shifted down to weeknights to co-anchor with London at 6 and 11 p.m. while either he or London would anchor the 7 p.m. edition solo.

On December 19, 2025, the host of Philly Live, Aunyea Lachelle, announced that she would be leaving the station after nearly seven years to pursue other interests; the show aired its final regular episode that day, as the 11 a.m. newscast returned to a full hour-long edition the following Monday. Philly Live continues to air as a part of the 11 a.m. newscast with morning traffic reporter Sheila Watko as its new host; however, it has been slimmed down to a short segment that airs at the end of the newscast.

On January 26, 2026, former WRAL-TV anchor and reporter Lena Tillett officially joined the station as a reporter and co-anchor of the 5 p.m. newscast with Jacqueline London and the 7 p.m. edition with Fred Shropshire. Tillett replaced Tracy Davidson on the 5 p.m. edition as Davidson had retired in November 2025 from the station after 30 years to pursue a career in public speaking.

==== Notable current on-air staff ====
- Keith Jones – anchor

==== Notable former on-air staff ====
On June 26, 1972, three news correspondents were killed in a helicopter crash in Harrisburg, Pennsylvania, where they had been covering the flooding stemming from Hurricane Agnes. The victims were Del Vaughn of CBS News and Sid Brenner and Lew Clark of WCAU, and the pilot, Mike Sedio.

- Diane Allen
- Donald Barnhouse
- Suzanne Bates
- Pat Battle
- John Bolaris
- Tom Brookshier
- Ron Burke
- Bill Campbell
- Renee Chenault-Fattah
- Herb Clarke – meteorologist (1958–1997)
- Gene Crane
- Tracy Davidson
- Lori Delgado
- Vince DeMentri
- Herb Denenberg
- Howard Eskin
- John Facenda
- Frank Ford
- Amy Freeze
- Doreen Gentzler
- Mike Golic
- Judd Hambrick
- Edie Huggins
- Jack Jones
- Larry Kane
- Matt Lauer – host of Live on City Line (1987–1988)
- Siani Lee
- Don Lemon
- Gene London – children's entertainer
- J. J. Maura
- Jade McCarthy
- Ed McMahon
- Jillian Mele
- Al Meltzer – sports anchor (1978–1998)
- Larry Mendte – anchor (1996–2003)
- Barney Morris
- Kathy Orr
- Ralph Penza
- Terry Ruggles
- Jim Rosenfield – anchor
- Glenn "Hurricane" Schwartz – meteorologist
- Phillip Sheridan
- Fred Sherman
- Vai Sikahema – former sports anchor and morning anchor
- Tammie Souza
- Stephanie Stahl
- Chuck Stone
- Mike Strug
- Michael Tuck – news anchor (1974–1978)
- Bill Vargus
- Jane Velez-Mitchell
- Lou Wagner
- Kristen Welker – reporter and weekend anchor (2005–2010)
- Jack Whitaker
- Brian Williams – New Jersey correspondent (1985–1987)

== Technical information and subchannels ==
WCAU and WWSI transmit using WCAU's spectrum from a tower in the Roxborough section of Philadelphia. The stations' signals are multiplexed:

Subchannels of WCAU and WWSI
License	Subchannel	Res.	Short name	Programming
WCAU	10.1	1080i	WCAU-TV	NBC
WCAU	10.2	480i	COZI-TV	Cozi TV
WCAU	10.3	480i	CRIMES	NBC True CRMZ
WCAU	10.4	480i	OXYGEN	Oxygen
WWSI	62.1	1080i	WWSI-TV	Telemundo
WWSI	62.2	480i	EXITOS	TeleXitos

On October 25, 2010, WCAU introduced its own version of WNBC's New York Nonstop channel, NBC Philadelphia Nonstop. This subchannel featured various news and entertainment programs, and a locally produced newscast at 7 p.m. On December 20, 2012, digital subchannel 10.2 became an affiliate of Cozi TV, which replaced the Nonstop network. 34.5 (virtual 62.1) carries WWSI, as described below, with 34.6/62.2 carrying TeleXitos, under a channel share agreement.

=== Analog-to-digital conversion ===
WCAU signed on its digital signal on December 4, 1998. The station shut down its analog signal, over VHF channel 10, on June 12, 2009, the official date on which full-power television stations in the United States transitioned from analog to digital broadcasts under federal mandate. The station's digital signal moved from its pre-transition UHF channel 67 to channel 34 for post-transition digital operations, because ABC affiliate WHTM-TV in Harrisburg, Pennsylvania, continued broadcasting on channel 10 after ceasing channel 27 analog transmission that day. Digital television receivers continue to display WCAU's virtual channel as its former VHF analog channel 10.

=== Channel share with WWSI ===
On April 13, 2017, it was revealed that the over-the-air spectrum of sister station WWSI had been sold in the FCC's spectrum reallocation auction, fetching $125.9 million. As a result, WWSI's signal is now co-located with WCAU; NBC stated that the WCAU transmitter provided "superior coverage".
