= Vince DeMentri =

American broadcast journalist

Vince DeMentri (born 1964) is an American broadcast journalist.

== Education and athletics ==
DeMentri is an alumnus of Pennsylvania's "Big 33" High School Football All-Star Game. DeMentri graduated from Temple University with a Bachelor of Arts in broadcast journalism. He played the position of linebacker for the Temple Owls football team from 1983 through 1986.

== Career ==
DeMentri began his broadcast journalism career as a sports producer for WPVI-TV in Philadelphia, and worked for WOI-TV as a weekend anchor in 1989. He was later an investigative reporter and anchor for WDIV-TV in Detroit, Michigan, WPRI-TV in Providence, Rhode Island, and WICS-TV in Springfield, Illinois.

In 1994, DeMentri joined CBS's flagship, WCBS-TV, in New York as a reporter, and became anchor of the station's weekend evening newscasts. He stayed there until 2003, when he moved to NBC's Philadelphia affiliate, WCAU-TV. DeMentri won several awards for his reporting for WCBS and WCAU, including seven Emmys for investigative reporting, and a national Edward R. Murrow Award for his reporting on the September 11, 2001 attacks on the World Trade Center. While at WCAU, DeMentri served as anchor for the early evening newscasts, as well as ones produced for WPHL-TV by the station.

In September 2012, DeMentri was hired by Sinclair Broadcasting to anchor the evening newscast at WICS-TV in Springfield, Illinois.

=== Investigative journalism ===
DeMentri was responsible for an investigative story that ultimately shed light on a conspiracy by high ranking officers at the Springfield Police Department, including its Chief, the police union, and The City’s Corporation Counsel. DeMentri’s week long investigative series of reports exposed how a plan was hatched to secretly destroy the Police Department’s Internal Affairs investigation into serious misdeeds committed by Assistant Police Chief Cliff Buscher after a FOIA request for those records were filed. The plan was carried out and Buscher’s IA records were shredded just hours before the records demanded in the FOIA request were due by law to be released.

DeMentri’s exclusive investigation revealed those IA records contained information that while Buscher was on vacation with several other officers and their teenage sons at a Missouri vacation lodge years prior to the FOIA request, Buscher was charged with weapons offenses, drunk and disorderly and disturbing the peace. All but one of those charges were felonies. The prosecuting attorney in Missouri dropped the felony gun and alcohol offenses, allowing Busher to plead to the misdemeanor charge of disturbing the peace.

According to DeMentri’s reporting, several Springfield police and Alderman sources said the conspiracy to destroy those records were centered on the fact that Buscher was going to be promoted to the department’s top cop in just a few months after the current Police Chief retired. DeMentri’s series of stories was entitled "Ready, Set, Shred," or colloquially and locally known as "Shredgate.” Within days of the airing of DeMentri’s last on-air report, Mayor Mike Houston, who maintained he knew nothing about the secret plan, demanded the immediate retirement of Police Chief Robert Williams and the resignation of the City’s Corporation Counsel, Mark Cullen, who in an official email signed off on the act. In addition, Assistant Corporation Counsel, Geanette Whittendorf was fired.

DeMentri continued his "hardball" type of investigative journalism, and eventually engaged in surprise interviews of then-Springfield Mayor, J. Michael Houston, regarding the "Shredgate" scandal. Dementri continued to highlight the scandal, and was later blamed by Houston for his eventual loss in the election. However, Mayor Houston was not the only casualty on election night. DeMentri himself allegedly engaged in a reported physical altercation with another station personality while at a local restaurant, causing law enforcement to be called, and within days, both TV personalities were terminated.

== Personal life ==
DeMentri is divorced from Pat James DeMentri, a morning show hostess for QVC. DeMentri appeared in the 1998 film U.S. Marshals as a reporter.
