= Glenn Schwartz (meteorologist) =

American meteorologist

- Born: Glenn Eric Schwartz; June 20, 1951 (age 75); Philadelphia, Pennsylvania, U.S.
- Other name: Hurricane
- Education: Pennsylvania State University
- Occupation: Meteorologist
- Years active: 1974–2022
- Known for: Hurricane coverage
- Awards: Philadelphia Broadcast Hall of Fame
- Website: thehurricaneschwartz.com

Glenn Eric "Hurricane" Schwartz (born June 20, 1951) is an American author and former meteorologist at the NBC-affiliate WCAU in Philadelphia.

== Early life and education ==
Schwartz was born in Philadelphia, one of two children, to Morris, an architect, and Miriam Schwartz. He attended Central High School and then attended Pennsylvania State University to study meteorology, graduating in 1972.

== Career ==
After graduation, Schwartz began his career at AccuWeather in State College, Pennsylvania. He gained experience with hurricanes at the National Hurricane Center in Miami, where he worked from 1974 to 1977. Schwartz first appeared on television at WAGA in Atlanta from 1979 to 1983. In 1985, he joined The Weather Channel and became one of the network's first "hurricane specialists." The next year, Schwartz left The Weather Channel for WNYW in New York. It was there that a colleague gave him the nickname "Hurricane" after seeing a video of him being blown around in one. Schwartz remained at WNYW until 1990 when he went to work for WPBF in West Palm Beach and then WINK in Fort Myers and WRAL in Raleigh.

In October 1995, Schwartz returned to Philadelphia as a meteorologist at the NBC-affiliate WCAU, where he has worked until his retirement in 2022. He was known for wearing a bow tie during broadcasts, which was required in his contract. Schwartz was a 2010 inductee into the Philadelphia Broadcast Hall of Fame. Schwartz became chief meteorologist in 2002, a title which he lost in 2017 to Tammie Souza. He lost the title without being demoted because he no longer appeared on the 11 p.m. newscast.

He co-authored the 2002 book, The Philadelphia Area Weather Book with fellow meteorologist Jon Nese. Schwartz included his live TV coverage of Hurricane Floyd in the book. Schwartz published a climate fiction novel The Weathermaker in a paperback edition in January 2020. It received positive reviews in The Philadelphia Inquirer, Jewish Exponent and San Diego Jewish World.
