= WOGL =

Classic hits radio station in Philadelphia

- Philadelphia, Pennsylvania; United States
- Broadcast area: Philadelphia metropolitan area
- Frequency: 98.1 MHz (HD Radio)
- Branding: Big 98.1

Programming
- Language: English
- Format: Classic hits
- Subchannels: HD2: Classic dance; HD3: Talk radio (WPHT)
- Affiliations: United Stations Radio Networks

Ownership
- Owner: Audacy, Inc.; (Audacy License, LLC)
- Sister stations: KYW; WBEB; WIP-FM; WPHI-FM; WPHT; WTDY-FM

History
- First air date: January 12, 1942
- Former call signs: W73PH (1942–1943); WPEN-FM (1943–1947); WCAU-FM (1947–1987)
- Former frequencies: 47.3 MHz (1942–1946); 99.5 MHz (1946–1947)
- Call sign meaning: "Old Gold" (spoonerism for "Golden Oldies")

Technical information
- Licensing authority: FCC
- Facility ID: 9622
- Class: B
- ERP: 9,600 watts (analog); 459 watts (digital)
- HAAT: 339 meters (1,112 ft)
- Transmitter coordinates: 40°2′30″N 75°14′10″W

Links
- Public license information: Public file; LMS
- Webcast: Listen live (via Audacy); Listen live (via Audacy) (HD2)
- Website: www.audacy.com/big981

WOGL (98.1 FM) is a commercial radio station licensed to serve Philadelphia, Pennsylvania, owned by Audacy, Inc. The station broadcasts a classic hits radio format. WOGL's transmitter is located in the Roxborough section of Philadelphia, and its studios and offices are co-located within Audacy's corporate headquarters in Center City, Philadelphia. The station features mostly hits from the 1970s, 1980s and 1990s with some 2000s hits.

WOGL uses HD Radio, and broadcasts a classic dance format on its HD2 subchannel. The talk radio programming of sister station WPHT is simulcast on its HD3 subchannel.

== History ==
=== Early years ===
WOGL's previous logo

On January 13, 1942, the Federal Communications Commission (FCC) granted the William Penn Broadcasting Company a construction permit for a new FM station on 47.3 MHz on the original 42-50 MHz FM broadcast band, with the call sign W73PH. Beginning the next month the station was issued a series of special authorizations to operate commercially with a temporary antenna, followed by its first full license on March 2, 1943.

William Penn Broadcasting also operated AM station WPEN (now WKDN) in Philadelphia, and on November 1, 1943, W73PH was assigned the WPEN-FM call sign. After the FCC created the current FM broadcast band on June 27, 1945, William Penn Broadcasting applied to the FCC for a construction permit on January 21, 1946, to install a new transmitter and antenna for operation on 99.5 MHz, and the FCC approved this application on October 24, 1946.

The station's license and construction permit were voluntarily assigned to the Philadelphia Record Company, owners of AM station WCAU (now WPHT) in Philadelphia, on November 28, 1947. This was effective December 18, 1947, and the station's call sign was changed to WCAU-FM the same day. On December 23, 1947, the FCC reassigned the station to 98.1 MHz, modifying the construction permit. The FCC granted a licensee name change from Philadelphia Record Company to WCAU, Inc. on March 3, 1948. The commission granted WCAU, Inc. a new license for the station for operation on 98.1 MHz on September 27, 1949.

On December 4, 1953, the FCC granted WCAU, Inc. a construction permit to relocate the station's transmitter and antenna to the Roxborough section of Philadelphia. The station's license was renewed by the FCC with the new facilities on October 19, 1954. The FCC granted a voluntary assignment of the station's license to Columbia Broadcasting System, Inc. on July 23, 1958.

Until 1966, WCAU-FM simulcast the middle of the road music heard on AM 1210 WCAU. Along with other CBS FM stations, WCAU-FM began airing "The Young Sound," a prerecorded format of instrumental easy listening songs based on contemporary hits.

=== Switch to oldies, then disco ===
In the fall of 1970, WCAU-FM replaced "The Young Sound" with an automated oldies format. For prerecorded announcements, the station used the voice of Jim Nettleton, a disc jockey on top-rated WABC in New York City. Prior to working for WABC, Jim Nettleton was a very popular DJ on WFIL from 1966 to 1969 before he was heard on WABC in late 1969. Live air personalities were eventually heard, with Nettleton moving from New York to host middays. The station played the hits from 1955 up to and including some current product.

At the end of 1975, the oldies format was replaced by disco music, a hot trend at the time. As disco cooled, the station called its format "Fascinatin' Rhythm". When the 1970s came to a close, the music became more diversified with the addition of jazz, pop and R&B. The station experimented briefly with a format called "Mellow Rhythm" at this time, hosted primarily by Dr. Perri Johnson (now a music therapist in Los Angeles).

=== Hot hits "98 Now" ===
Program consultant Mike Joseph was brought into WCAU-FM in April 1981, to develop a new format to replace the struggling "Mellow Rhythm". Joseph recommended that the station go contemporary hit radio. On September 24, 1981, at midnight, the new format at WCAU-FM debuted: an all-current-hits, high-energy, jingle-intensive top 40 sound dubbed "Hot Hits". Joseph first put Hot Hits on the air in 1977 at WTIC-FM in Hartford, Connecticut, with a significant increase in ratings. Joseph called the station "98 Now". WCAU-FM's ratings showed an immediate improvement, and subsequently, FM stations in major radio markets such as WBBM-FM in Chicago, WHYT in Detroit, WMAR-FM in Baltimore, CKOM in Saskatoon, WFEC in Harrisburg, WNVZ in Norfolk, and KITS in San Francisco picked up the "Hot Hits" format.

WCAU-FM found a great deal of success with this programming for much of the mid-1980s, although the original "Fusion" jingles from TM were dropped in the summer of 1982, and replaced with a package from JAM to increase appeal to older listeners. Some notable DJs on the station in this period included Paul Barsky, Rich Hawkins, Billy Burke, Terry Young and Christy Springfield.

=== Return to oldies, evolution to classic hits ===
In 1987, WCAU-FM found itself with stiff competition in the CHR/Top 40 format from WEGX, "Eagle 106". CBS decided that WCAU-FM could be more profitable appealing to an older, more desirable demographic of 25-to 54-year-olds. On November 9, 1987, at 7 p.m., after playing "Another One Bites the Dust" by Queen, WCAU-FM returned to the oldies format as WOGL (which stood for "Old Gold"). The first song on WOGL was "Good Golly, Miss Molly" by Little Richard. Eleven hours later, however, WIOQ shifted to oldies as well. WOGL had a deep playlist, playing a larger number of songs than most oldies stations. For the next year, WOGL and WIOQ competed for Philadelphia's FM oldies audience, until WIOQ dropped the format early in 1989. Scott Walker, who programmed Hot Hits WCAU-FM, remained as Program Director.

Originally, WOGL was known as "Oldies 98". By 1992, WOGL incorporated more soul oldies. The station still played artists such as Elvis, The Beatles and The Rolling Stones, but in addition, it focused on soul, including Philadelphia-only hits. The mix was about 2/3 R&B and 1/3 rock and pop, with the rock and pop songs that were played being the big hits typically heard on oldies stations. WOGL played about 15% 1950s, 15% early 1960s, 55% mid-to-late 1960s, 13% 1970s, and 2% 1980s.

WOGL aired specialty shows such as the "Hot Lunch Special" request show, "The Weeknight Hall Of Fame," "Top 20 Oldies Countdown," "Elvis & Friends," "The Saturday Night Dance Party," "Brunch With The Beatles," and "Street Corner Sunday" (a Doo Wop music program). In 2001, all specialty shows were dropped. The playlist was moved away from soul and Philadelphia-only hits (though a few remained), and moved towards a more traditional playlist as found on other oldies stations. The music was about 70% 1960s, 10% 1950s, 15% 1970s, and 5% 1980s. Scott Walker left the station in 2001.

By 2002, some of the specialty shows were brought back, including a modified version of "Street Corner Sunday". While it was strictly doo wop in its previous incarnation, it was updated to play all types of pre-1964 oldies. In addition, more 1970s music was added and even some 1980s tracks were heard. In 2003, the name "Oldies 98" was downplayed and the station became known as "Motown Soul Rock & Roll: 98.1 WOGL". At that point, the station cut to one 1950s song per hour and one pre-'64 song per hour. It also played a couple of 1980s songs per hour. The rest of the music was roughly 50% mid and late 1960s and 50% 1970s music. In 2004, the playlist was tightened to about half 1960s and half 1970s. Their slogan also changed to "Greatest Hits of the '60s and '70s." In late 2007 and early 2008, more 1980s music was added to the rotation, and effective July 6, 2008, WOGL's slogan was changed to "The Greatest Hits of the 60s, 70s and 80s," which is also used on sister station WCBS-FM when it returned to an Oldies/Classic Hits format in July 2007.

In late 2016, morning co-host Valerie Knight was let go after 14 years with the station. In 2017, Frank Lewis and Bill Zimpfer, co-hosts of WOGL's morning show "The Breakfast Club", were also let go.

As of 2018, WOGL no longer plays 1960s and early 1970s music, with its playlist shifting towards focusing on hits from the 1970s through the early 1990s, with a heavy focus on the 1980s.

On January 21, 2018, "Street Corner Sunday" was discontinued after 29 years in favor of regular programming.

As of April 2022, WOGL has increased the frequency of 1980s and 1990s hits per day and is also adding music from the 2000s.

=== Big 98.1 ===
On April 28, 2022, at 8:30 a.m., after playing "Got My Mind Set on You" by George Harrison and going into a commercial stopset, the station began a half-hour stunt with songs that featured the word "big" in the title or artist name, such as "To Be with You" by Mr. Big, "Big Pimpin'" by Jay Z featuring UGK, "Mr. Big Stuff" by Jean Knight, "Big Girls Don't Cry" by Fergie and "Big Me" by Foo Fighters. At 9:00, WOGL relaunched as "Big 98.1", readjusting their classic hits format to focus primarily on songs from the 1970s to the 1990s, with the first song being "Don't Stop Believin'" by Journey. With the move, the station temporarily suspended most of their airstaff with the exception of morning host Sean 'Coop' Tabler; Audacy Philadelphia market manager David Yadgaroff disclosed to the Philadelphia Business Journal that the mostly-jockless launch is expected to last, by his estimation, "a short period of time — a couple of weeks to a month or so. [...] And then as we move through the spring and into the summer, we will add some additional hosts for mid-day afternoon and evening." The change also resulted in the unannounced departure of the station's longtime weekend program "Bob Pantano's Dance Party", which had been heard on the station on Saturday nights and would move to the station's HD2 subchannel after being on the main frequency as far back as WOGL's launch in 1987.

Following the rebrand, the station would continue to shift further away from the typical boundaries of the classic hits format, with the station beginning to add songs from as late as the 2000s, primarily from the rhythmic contemporary format, to the point of throwing out the entire classic hits format for the 2025 Memorial Day weekend and shifting to a temporary new classic hip hop format, promoting it as a "Throwback Weekend" for the holiday. While the classic hits format would return following the holiday, it did so with a further-increased focus on rhythmic contemporary throwbacks, signaling a further evolution of the "Big" format.

=== Jingles ===
From the late 1980s through the early 1990s, WOGL used jingles from Frank Gari Productions, Otis Connor, and TM Studios. From the mid-1990s through the early 2000s, the station used the Do It Again jingle package by JAM Creative Productions and the Super Hits package by Tony Griffin, both of which were also used by sister station WCBS-FM. From 2003 to 2017, the station used jingles from a variety of different JAM packages, most of which were resings of 1970s-80s top 40 station jingles. Since late 2017, the station has been using jingles from Reelworld Productions.

=== Entercom/Audacy ownership ===
On February 2, 2017, CBS agreed to merge CBS Radio with Entercom (now Audacy). The merger was approved on November 9, 2017, and was consummated on November 17. Though CBS shareholders own 72 percent of Entercom, the latter is still its own public company, effectively separating WOGL and its sister stations from KYW-TV and WPSG-TV.
