= Ragan Henry =

Ragan Henry (1934–2008) was African American media mogul. He is noted for his pioneering work in the radio and television industries and is recognized as the first African American to own a network-affiliated television station.

== Biography ==
Henry was born in 1934 in Sadieville, Kentucky to Augustus and Ruby Henry. He came from a low-income family. It is reported that his father was a carpenter's helper. Other sources claimed that his parents were tobacco sharecroppers. Henry was able to secure a scholarship at Harvard and graduated magna cum laude in 1956. He served in the U.S. Army from 1957 to 1959. He became a Philadelphia lawyer after completing a law degree from Harvard Law in 1961. Henry then worked for the law firm, Wolf, Block, Schorr & Solis-Cohen, where he eventually became a partner.

Henry bought his first radio station, the Atlanta-based WAOK, in 1972. He had $28,000 savings and used it as deposit while spending his salary to produce feasibility studies. By borrowing from friends and lobbying banks and venture capital firms, he was able to secure the $3.5 million deficit to seal the deal.

=== Media empire ===
In 1979, Henry became the owner of WHEC-TV, a television station in Rochester, New York. He was said to have subsidized the station for several months after it was boycotted by local car dealers, which constituted the radio stations largest advertisers. The boycott stemmed from an investigative report that Henry allowed to air, revealing the practice of car dealers setting odometers back.

By 1990, Henry had owned more than 60 mainly radio stations in the United States. He was also an investor in several media companies. By 1989, he was the chairman and CEO of the Ragan Henry Broadcast Group, Inc.

Henry also had an interest in newspapers. An account cited that he was eyeing a newspaper in Philadelphia but he could not get it to do the things he wanted to do so he created his own. This newspaper came to be called The National Leader, which had Claude Lewis as its editor.

=== Legacy ===
The University of Maryland’s Library of American Broadcasting recognized Henry as one of the "First Fifty Giants of Broadcasting". Henry died in July 2008 in Merion, Pennsylvania.
