= WPHT =

Talk radio station in Philadelphia

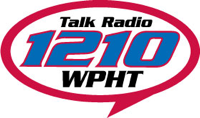
- Philadelphia, Pennsylvania; United States
- Broadcast area: Philadelphia metropolitan area
- Frequency: 1210 kHz (HD Radio)
- Branding: Talk Radio 1210 WPHT

Programming
- Format: Talk radio
- Affiliations: ABC News Radio; Fox News Radio; Premiere Networks; Radio America; Westwood One; Penn State Nittany Lions; Temple Owls

Ownership
- Owner: Audacy, Inc.; (Audacy License, LLC)
- Sister stations: KYW; WBEB; WIP-FM; WOGL; WPHI-FM; WTDY-FM

History
- First air date: May 1, 1922
- Former call signs: WCAU (1922–1990); WOGL (1990–1994); WGMP (1994–1996); WPTS (1996)
- Call sign meaning: Philadelphia's Talk

Technical information
- Licensing authority: FCC
- Facility ID: 9634
- Class: A
- Power: 50,000 watts unlimited
- Transmitter coordinates: 39°58′46.4″N 74°59′11.61″W (main); (auxiliary) 39°58′42.4″N 74°59′13.6″W (aux)
- Repeater: 98.1 WOGL-HD3 (Philadelphia)

Links
- Public license information: Public file; LMS
- Webcast: Listen live (via Audacy)
- Website: www.audacy.com/1210wpht

WPHT (1210 kHz) is a commercial AM radio station in Philadelphia, Pennsylvania. The station broadcasts a talk radio format and is owned by Audacy, Inc. Its studios are in Audacy's corporate headquarters on Market Street in Center City, and its transmitter and broadcast tower are on North Church Street in Moorestown, New Jersey.

WPHT is a Class A clear channel station broadcasting at 50,000 watts non-directional, the maximum for commercial AM stations. It is one of two clear-channel stations in Philadelphia, the other being sister station KYW. Its signal covers the Philadelphia metropolitan area and much of the Lehigh Valley region of eastern Pennsylvania and parts of New Jersey, Delaware, and Maryland. At night, it can be received in much of the Eastern United States and Eastern Canada with a good radio. Programming is also available to listeners on the HD3 digital subchannel of sister station 98.1 WOGL.

== Programming ==
=== Talk ===
WPHT programming is mostly conservative talk. Weekdays, local hosts discuss a mix of national issues and news in the Philadelphia metropolitan area. Weeknights, nationally syndicated programs are heard, including The Mark Levin Show and Coast to Coast AM with George Noory.

On weekends, shows focus on money, health, law and real estate, some of which are paid brokered programming. Mike Opelka, Jimmy Failla, Walter Sterling and Matt Rooney host talk shows on weekend evenings. Sunday middays feature the long-running Sounds of Sinatra with Sid Mark. Some hours begin with an update from ABC News Radio. Weather is supplied by WPVI-TV.

=== Sports ===
WPHT airs Temple University football and men's basketball games, along with select Penn State Nittany Lions games. The WPHT High School Football Scoreboard Show takes place at 10:00 p.m. on Friday nights in the fall, covering high school football scores in the local area.

WPHT was the flagship station for Philadelphia Phillies baseball for 32 years, until the 2016 season, when co-owned 94.1 WIP-FM took over that role. However, WPHT still carries any Phillies games that WIP-FM is unable to air due to programming conflicts.

== History ==
=== Early years ===
The station first began broadcasting as WCAU on May 1, 1922. It was a 250-watt station operating out of electrician William Durham's home at 19th and Market Streets. It is Philadelphia's third-oldest radio station, having signed on two months after WIP (now WTEL) and WFIL. In 1924, WCAU was sold to law partners Ike Levy and Daniel Murphy. Murphy later bowed out in favor of Ike's brother, Leon, a local dentist.

The station began its long association with CBS in 1927, when it was one of 16 charter network affiliates of the Columbia Phonographic Broadcasting System, a network airing CBS' first program on September 18, 1927. (Note: The other stations were WOR, Newark; WADC, Akron; WAIU, Columbus; WCAO, Baltimore; WEAN, Providence; WFBL, Syracuse; WGHP, Detroit; WJAS, Pittsburgh; WKRC, Cincinnati; WMAK, Buffalo-Lockport; WMAQ, Chicago; WNAC, Boston; WOWO, Fort Wayne; KMOX, St. Louis; and KOIL, Omaha-Council Bluffs.) The network struggled to find advertisers, however, and William S. Paley, who had previously purchased time on the station for an entertainment program promoting his family's La Palina cigars, bought the network with $500,000 of his family's money and renamed it the Columbia Broadcasting System.

Actor Paul Douglas began his career at WCAU, where he worked as an announcer and sportscaster from 1928 to 1934.

=== Power boost and shortwave ===
In 1930, WCAU initiated a shortwave radio service, operating under the call sign W3XAU. It is believed that this was the first license issued by the FCC for a commercial international shortwave broadcast station. Initially W3XAU simulcast WCAU programming, but eventually original programming was created specifically for international listeners. W3XAU, later WCAI, then WCAB, was closed down in 1941 as CBS consolidated various shortwave operations. The 10 kW shortwave transmitter was disassembled, and WCAU staff were told that it was sent to England to aid the BBC war propaganda efforts. However, the transmitter was actually sent to Camp X, a secret World War II paramilitary and commando training facility located near Toronto, Ontario, Canada, becoming part of the Hydra signals intelligence and communications program.

A series of power increases brought the station to 50,000 watts, with a new 50,000-watt transmitter dedicated October 2, 1932. The Levy brothers eventually became major stockholders in CBS, and were members of the network's board for many years.

=== Studios and FM ===
On December 26, 1932, WCAU moved to a new facility at 1622 Chestnut Street. Broadcasting magazine called it "a thoroughly modern 9-story building ... erected especially for the WCAU Broadcasting Co." The building included 8 studios and "a special office for Leopold Stokowski, director of the Philadelphia Orchestra".

WCAU began experimenting with an FM station in 1942 and it was licensed in 1943. The call sign in its early years was WCAU-FM and it broadcast at 102.9 MHz.

=== CBS ownership ===
The Levys agreed to sell WCAU-AM-FM to The Philadelphia Record in 1946. However, the Record folded shortly thereafter, and its "goodwill", including the rights to buy WCAU-AM-FM, passed to the Philadelphia Bulletin, which already owned WPEN and WPEN-FM, and had secured a construction permit for WPEN-TV (channel 10). In a complex deal, the Bulletin sold off WPEN and WCAU-FM, while changing WPEN-FM's call sign to WCAU-FM and WPEN-TV's call letters to WCAU-TV. The Levys continued to run the stations while serving as consultants to the Bulletin, and it was largely due to their influence that WCAU-TV took to the air on May 23, 1948, as a CBS affiliate. The stations moved to a new studio in Bala Cynwyd in 1952.

In 1957, the Bulletin sold WCAU-AM-FM-TV to CBS. This came because the Bulletin had recently bought WGBI-TV in Scranton, Pennsylvania and changed its call sign to WDAU-TV to complement WCAU. However, the two television stations' signals overlapped so much that it constituted a duopoly under Federal Communications Commission (FCC) rules of the time. CBS had to get a waiver to keep its new Philadelphia cluster. In addition to significant overlap of the television stations' grade B signals, the FCC normally did not allow common ownership of clear channel stations with overlapping nighttime signals.

=== Talk and news ===
In the 1960s, WCAU gradually began moving away from music programming, as most CBS stations. By 1967, it had become a talk station with considerable strengths in news and sports. All of Philadelphia's major professional sports teams had WCAU as their flagship radio station at one time or another. Although the station's ratings were good, in the mid-1970s, CBS made a corporate decision to move WCAU to an all-news format. All-news had earlier been established on WCBS in New York City, KNX in Los Angeles, and several other CBS AM stations.

WCAU never caught up to established all-news rival KYW. By 1980, WCAU was making moves to reclaim its heritage as a talk and sports leader. However, 96.5 WWDB-FM had established itself as a strong talk station, and WCAU struggled for years to attract listeners and establish a consistent image.

=== Oldies and sports ===
On August 15, 1990, CBS abruptly changed the WCAU call sign after 68 years, becoming WOGL. It dropped the talk format in favor of oldies of the 1950s, 1960s, and 1970s. It was partially simulcast with its FM sister station, by then WOGL-FM.

In 1993, the AM station began running sports talk after 7 pm. The station went full-time with the format March 18, 1994, with the calls switching to WGMP and the station now called The Game. Once again it went against a deeply entrenched competitor, WIP with a much weaker lineup of mainly syndicated personalities, and critically without any local professional sports rights, effectively leaving the format adrift with little support as CBS itself was distracted with its merger with Group W/Westinghouse and a trade of WCAU-TV to NBC to accommodate Group W's KYW-TV.

=== Merger with Westinghouse ===
The CBS/Westinghouse merger completed a year later, and 1210 was now a sister station to its long-time rival, KYW. With this move, the higher-rated KYW became the flagship station of CBS Radio's Philadelphia cluster. Finding it a losing battle to continue to compete with WIP, CBS soon began to phase out its existing sports talk programming through the summer of 1996.

Finally, on August 23, the station went all-talk once again as WPTS, calls switched merely a month later to avoid radio diary confusion with WPST to the north in Trenton, New Jersey, landing on WPHT instead. Only a year later, WIP became a sister station to WPHT when CBS merged with its owner, Infinity Broadcasting Corporation, which was then part of Viacom.

=== Entercom ownership ===
On February 2, 2017, CBS Radio announced it would merge with Entercom. Entercom already owned numerous radio stations around the country and wanted to add the CBS stations to its portfolio. The merger was approved on November 9, 2017, and was consummated on November 17. In 2021, Entercom changed its name to Audacy, Inc.

In 2020, WPHT host Ken Matthews was named one of the 100 most important talk radio show hosts (the "Heavy Hundred") in America by TALKERS Magazine.

WPHT's longtime association with CBS ended in 2026, when CBS News Radio was shut down. The station then became an affiliate of ABC News Radio.

== See also ==
- Broadcasting of sports events
- CBS radio
- KYW (AM)
- WIP-FM
- WOGL
- List of initial AM-band station grants in the United States
