= 1960 in television =

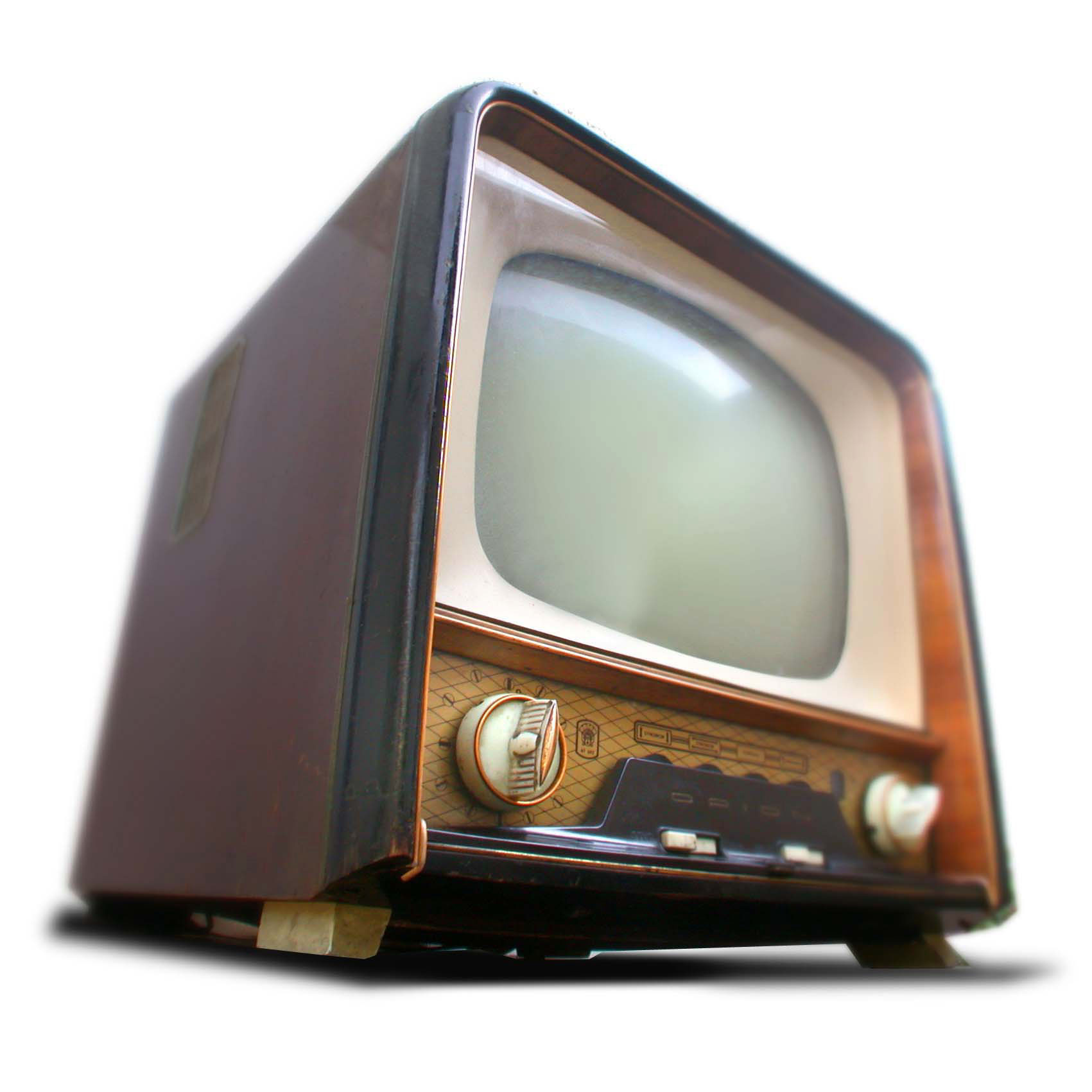

The year 1960 in television involved some significant events. Below is a list of television-related events during 1960.

== Events ==
- February 10 – Jack Paar temporarily quits his television program in the United States because his monologue had been edited the night before, in favor of a three-minute news update. Parr walks out to the audience at the beginning of the show, announces that he is quitting, says "There's got to be a better way to make a living," and then walks off the stage. After network executives apologize personally, Parr resumes hosting the program a month later. His first show back starts with the words "As I was saying before I was interrupted...".
- February–September – In a first for US audiences, CBS broadcasts the 1960 Winter Olympics and Summer Olympics, on an exclusive basis, for $60,000. From Squaw Valley, American viewers are treated to 31 hours of coverage, which includes a mix of alpine skiing, figure skating, ice hockey, speed skating, and ski jumping. The Winter Olympic broadcast is hosted by Walter Cronkite while a young Jim McKay, who will go on to host ABC's Olympic coverage, does the Rome Games.
- March 1 – Philippines's third television station DZTV-TV (now owned by the Intercontinental Broadcasting Corporation) starts broadcasts at 6:30 pm under the Inter-Island Broadcasting Corporation through the tri-media conglomerate of RMN-IBC-Philippine Herald owned by Andrés Soriano, owner at this time of San Miguel Corporation.
- March 2 – Lucille Ball files for divorce from Desi Arnaz, ending their 20-year marriage and the I Love Lucy franchise on CBS.
- April 29 – RTSH started test transmissions at 6:00 pm, just only one day before an official launch.
- June 1 – Auckland TV2, as predecessor for TVNZ 1 (Television New Zealand), a first television station in New Zealand, officially starts regular broadcasting service in Auckland.
- June 11 - CBS broadcasts the Monaco Grand Prix Formula 1 race (which took place on May 29), possibly the first broadcast of any F1 race in the United States.
- June 20 – Nan Winton becomes the first national female newsreader on BBC television in the United Kingdom.
- June 29 – The BBC Television Centre is opened in London.
- July 21 – ERTU Al Oula, a member of the Egyptian Radio and Television Union, a first television broadcasting service, is launched in Egypt.
- July 31 – Telecuraçao is launched as the Netherlands Antilles' first television station, and also of the Antilliaanse Television Company (ATM).
- August 20 – NRK1, a first television station in Norway, an officially regular broadcasting service starts in Oslo.
- September 19 – Nikita Khrushchev, leader of the Soviet Union, arrives in New York City for the opening session of the United Nations General Assembly. The United States government asks television networks to minimize coverage of his visit.
- September 24 – After thirteen seasons of entertaining American children, NBC children's show Howdy Doody ends with Clarabell the Clown saying the final two words of the show ("Goodbye Kids") after being assumed to be mute.
- September 25 – First Japanese colour television broadcast.
- September 26 – The 1960 United States presidential debates, the first in history, take place as the two major candidates, Republican U.S. Vice President Richard Nixon and Democrat U.S. Senator John F. Kennedy, face each other live in Chicago at the television studios of WBBM-TV. Carried live by all three networks, the debate begins at 8:30 p.m. local time and lasts one hour. This first debate demonstrates the power of television in influencing voters: Kennedy appears tan and charismatic, while Nixon, due in part to poor makeup and a recent hospitalization, looks unkempt and tense, and this may impact on the outcome of the election. A special act of Congress has been passed in order to allow the American television and radio networks to broadcast the debate without having to provide equal time to other presidential candidates. In addition to being the first presidential debates to be televised, the debates also mark the first time "split screen" images are used by a network.
- October 1 – Argentine television station, El Trece, a first officially regular broadcasting service, starts in Buenos Aires.
- October 5 – KEYC-TV signs on today, just in time to broadcast the first game of the World Series tonight from NBC.
- October 12 – Inejiro Asanuma, chairman of the Japan Socialist Party, is assassinated by Otoya Yamaguchi using a wakizashi (samurai sword) during a political debate in Tokyo being taped by Japanese television broadcaster NHK.
- November 4 – The University of Chile inaugurates its TV station over Channel 9 in Santiago, Chile. Its first broadcast marks the first live broadcast of a TV show in Chile.
- December 9 – The first episode of soap opera Coronation Street, made by Granada Television in Manchester, England, is aired on ITV. Intended as a 13-week pilot and disfavoured by critics, it continues past its 10,000th episode in 2020 (its 60th anniversary year) as Britain's longest running soap.
- December 31 – Norma Zimmer officially becomes Lawrence Welk's "Champagne Lady" on The Lawrence Welk Show. She would remain with the show until it ended in 1982.

=== Undated ===
- Frank and Doris Hursley start their soap opera writing career, taking the jobs of joint head writers for the series Search for Tomorrow.
- Nearly 90% of homes in the United States now have a television set, and over one hundred million television sets are in use worldwide.

== Programs/programmes ==
=== Debuts ===
- January 9 – Baseball competition Home Run Derby from Wrigley Field (Los Angeles) begins a six-month run in syndication.
- January 25 – Series The Kate Smith Show begins a six-month run on CBS.
- February 7 – Series Overland Trail begins a four-month run on NBC.
- June 1 – TV One is initiated in Auckland. This is the first television transmission in New Zealand.
- June 8 – Series Happy (1960–1961) and Tate (1960) both premiere on NBC.
- June 13 – Series Deadline Midnight premieres on ITV (1960–1961).
- June 28 – Series Mess Mates premieres on ITV in UK (1960–1962).
- September 6 – Series Coronado 9 begins a six-month run on NBC (1960–1961).
- September 11 – Series Danger Man premieres on ITV in UK; broadcast also by CBS in USA (1960–1961, 1964–1966).
- September 17 – Series Checkmate premieres on CBS (1960–1962).
- September 18 – Series The Tab Hunter Show premieres on NBC (1960–1961).
- September 23 – Series Dan Raven premieres on NBC (1960–1961).
- September 27 – Series The Tom Ewell Show premieres on CBS (1960–1961).
- September 29 – Series My Three Sons premieres on ABC (1960–1972).
- September 29 – Series Outlaws premieres on NBC (1960–1962).
- September 30 – Hanna-Barbera's series The Flintstones debuts on ABC (1960–1966).
- October 1 – NBC commences airings of The Shari Lewis Show and Popeye the Sailor (Both 1960–1963)
- October 3 – Series The Andy Griffith Show premieres on CBS (1960–1968).
- October 4 – Series Stagecoach West premieres on ABC (1960–1961).
- October 5 – Series My Sister Eileen premieres on CBS (1960–1961).
- October 7 – Series Route 66 premieres on CBS (1960–1964).
- October 10
  - Series Bringing Up Buddy premieres on CBS (1960–1961).
  - Series Klondike premieres on NBC (1960–1961).
- October 11 – The Bugs Bunny Show, Looney Tunes' first television series (1960–2000).
- October 12 – Series Peter Loves Mary premieres on NBC (1960–1961).
- December 9 – Soap opera Coronation Street premieres on Granada Television in UK (1960-present).
- Comedy show Radio Rochela (previously the La Cruzada del Buen Humor segment of El Show de las Doce) debuts on RCTV in Venezuela (1960–2010).

=== Television shows ===
==== 1940s ====
- Meet the Press (1947–present).
- Howdy Doody (1947–1960).
- Candid Camera (1948–present).
- The Ed Sullivan Show (1948–1971).
- Bozo the Clown (1949–present).
- Come Dancing (UK) (1949–1995).
- The Voice of Firestone (1949–1963).

==== 1950s ====
- The Jack Benny Show (1950–1965).
- Men into Space (1959–1960).
- Truth or Consequences (1950–1988).
- What's My Line (1950–1967).
- Love of Life (1951–1980).
- I Love Lucy (1951–1960)
- Search for Tomorrow (1951–1986).
- Hallmark Hall of Fame (1951–present).
- American Bandstand (1952–1989).
- The Adventures of Ozzie and Harriet (1952–1966).
- The Guiding Light (1952–2009).
- The Today Show (1952–present).
- This Is Your Life (US) (1952–1961).
- Panorama (UK) (1953–present).
- The Good Old Days (UK) (1953–1983).
- Face the Nation (1954–present).
- The Brighter Day (1954–1962).
- The Milton Berle Show (1954–1967).
- The Secret Storm (1954–1974).
- The Tonight Show (1954–present).
- Zoo Quest (UK) (1954–1964).
- Alfred Hitchcock Presents (1955–1962).
- Captain Kangaroo (1955–1984).
- Cheyenne (1955–1962).
- Dixon of Dock Green (UK) (1955–1976).
- Gunsmoke (1955–1975).
- Jubilee USA (1955–1960).
- The Lawrence Welk Show (1955–1982).
- This Is Your Life (UK) (1955–2003).
- Armchair Theatre (UK) (1956–1968).
- As the World Turns (1956–2010).
- Hancock's Half Hour (1956–1962).
- Opportunity Knocks (UK) (1956–1978).
- The Edge of Night (1956–1984).
- The Ford Show, Starring Tennessee Ernie Ford (1956–1961).
- The Price Is Right (1956–1965).
- What the Papers Say (UK) (1956–2008).
- Leave It to Beaver (1957–1963).
- The Pat Boone Chevy Showroom (1957–1960).
- The Army Game (UK) (1957–1961).
- Perry Mason (1957–1966).
- The Sky at Night (UK) (1957–present).
- Blue Peter (UK) (1958–present).
- General Motors Presents (Can) (1953–1956, 1958–1961)
- Grandstand (UK) (1958–2007).
- Peter Gunn (1958–1961).
- The Donna Reed Show (1958–1966).
- The Huckleberry Hound Show (1958–1962).
- Walt Disney Presents (1958–1961).
- Westinghouse Desilu Playhouse (1958–1960)
- Bonanza (1959–1973).
- Hawaiian Eye (1959–1963).
- Juke Box Jury (1959–1967, 1979, 1989–1990).
- The Bell Telephone Hour (1959–1968).
- The Twilight Zone (1959-1964, 1985–1988, 2002).
- This Man Dawson (1959–1960).
- The Rebel (1959–1961).

=== Ending this year ===
Date	Show	Debut
January 25	Love and Marriage	1959
April 1	The Troubleshooters	1959
June 11	The Man and the Challenge	1959
September 14	Tate	1960
Unknown date	This Man Dawson	1959

== Births ==
Date	Name	Notability
January 4	Julia St. John	British actress
January 4	April Winchell	American voice actress and daughter of Paul Winchell (Goof Troop, 101 Dalmatians: The Series, Pepper Ann, Recess, Wander Over Yonder)
January 6	Howie Long	American football player, commentator
January 6	Andrea Thompson	American actress
January 7	David Marciano	American actor
January 12	Oliver Platt	Canadian-American actor
January 12	Dominique Wilkins	NBA basketball player
January 13	Bruno Heller	English screenwriter
January 29	JG Thirlwell	Australian musician
January 30	Tony O'Dell	American actor (Head of the Class)
February 6	Megan Gallagher	American actress
February 7	Robert Smigel	American actor, comedian (Saturday Night Live)
February 7	Steve Johnson	American special effects artist
February 7	James Spader	American actor (Boston Legal, The Blacklist)
February 18	Greta Scacchi	Italian-Australian actress
February 19	Leslie Ash	English actress (Men Behaving Badly)
February 20	Wendee Lee	American voice actress
February 21	Joel McKinnon Miller	American actor
February 22	Paul Abbott	English screenwriter (Shameless)
February 28	Dorothy Stratten	Canadian model (Playboy) and actress (d. 1980)
February 29	Tony Robbins	American author
February 29	Steve Levitt	American actor
March 8	Buck Williams	NBA basketball player
March 11	Perri Peltz	American journalist
March 12	Jason Beghe	American actor (Chicago P.D.)
March 12	Courtney B. Vance	American actor (Law & Order: Criminal Intent)
March 13	Joe Ranft	American voice actor (d. 2005)
March 17	Vicki Lewis	American singer, actress (NewsRadio)
March 18	Richard Biggs	American actor (died 2004)
March 21	Matthew Arkin	American actor
March 25	Haywood Nelson	American actor (What's Happening!!, What's Happening Now!!)
March 25	Russ Mitchell	American journalist
March 25	Brenda Strong	American actress (Desperate Housewives)
March 26	Ellia English	American singer, actress (The Jamie Foxx Show)
March 26	Jennifer Grey	American actress
March 29	Annabella Sciorra	American actress
March 30	Michael McGrady	American actor
April 1	Jennifer Runyon	American actress
April 4	Lorraine Toussaint	American actress
April 5	Greg Mathis	American judge
April 6	Jane A. Rogers	American actress
April 6	John Pizzarelli	American vocalist
April 7	Elaine Miles	American actress (Northern Exposure)
April 8	John Schneider	American actor (The Dukes of Hazzard)
April 10	Ed Norris	American radio host
April 11	Jeremy Clarkson	English journalist and presenter (Top Gear)
April 14	Brad Garrett	American actor (Everybody Loves Raymond, 'Til Death)
April 14	Brian Forster	American actor (The Partridge Family)
April 15	Susanne Bier	Danish director, screenwriter
April 15	Pedro Delgado	Spanish sportcaster
April 16	Stan Foster	American actor (Tour of Duty)
April 16	Michel Gill	American actor (House of Cards, Mr. Robot)
April 22	Bobby Clampett	American golfer
April 23	Valerie Bertinelli	American actress (One Day at a Time, Hot in Cleveland)
April 29	Steve Blum	American voice actor (Cowboy Bebop, Megas XLR, Ben 10).
May 2	Kevin Brennan	American comedian
May 5	Kurt Sutter	American creator, actor
May 6	Julianne Phillips	American model, actress (Sisters)
May 6	Roma Downey	Irish actress
May 6	John Flansburgh	American musician
May 7	Adam Bernstein	American film director, music video director and television director
May 8	Stella Gonet	Actress (Holby City)
May 14	Ian Baker-Finch	Golfer
May 15	Rob Bowman	Director
May 17	Simon Fuller	British entrepreneur
May 17	Fiona Hutchison	American actress (One Life to Live, Guiding Light)
May 20	John Billingsley	American actor (Star Trek: Enterprise)
May 20	Tony Goldwyn	American actor, director (Scandal)
May 21	Jeffrey Toobin	American author
May 24	Doug Jones	American actor
May 24	Kristin Scott Thomas	British actress
May 31	Chris Elliott	American actor, comedian (Saturday Night Live, Get a Life)
June 2	Shaun Wallace	British game show contestant
June 4	Bradley Walsh	British actor, game show host
June 5	Leslie Hendrix	American actress (All My Children, Law & Order)
June 7	Bill Prady	American television writer, producer
June 11	Mehmet Oz	American television host
June 12	Linda Church	American weathercaster
June 17	Thomas Haden Church	American actor (Wings)
June 18	Christopher Lloyd	American producer
June 21	Kevin Harlan	Television and radio sports announcer
June 22	Catherine Disher	Actress
June 25	Eve Gordon	American actress
June 30	Michael Katleman	American director
July 5	Bruce Lanoil	Puppeteer
July 7	Ralph Sampson	NBA basketball player
July 8	Valarie Pettiford	American actress (Half & Half)
July 10	Jeff Bergman	American voice actor (The Looney Tunes Show)
July 11	Caroline Quentin	English actress (Men Behaving Badly)
July 14	Jane Lynch	American actress (Glee)
July 15	Willie Aames	American actor (Eight is Enough, Charles in Charge)
July 16	Leila Kenzle	American actress (Mad About You)
July 17	Nancy Giles	American actress (China Beach), commentator (CBS News Sunday Morning)
July 17	Mark Burnett	British television producer
July 18	Anne-Marie Johnson	American actress
July 20	John Leguizamo	Actor
July 21	Matt Mulhern	American actor (Major Dad)
July 30	Daniel McDonald	American actor (died 2007)
July 30	Richard Linklater	American screenwriter
August 1	Chuck D	Rapper
August 6	Grant Aleksander	American actor (Guiding Light)
August 6	Leland Orser	American actor
August 7	David Duchovny	American actor (The X-Files)
August 10	Antonio Banderas	Spanish actor, director (Interview with the Vampire, Shrek)
August 16	Timothy Hutton	American actor, producer (Ordinary People, Leverage)
August 17	Lisa Coleman	American musician
August 17	Sean Penn	American actor
August 17	Johnny Wright	American music manager
August 26	Branford Marsalis	American bandleader
August 28	Emma Samms	British actress (General Hospital, Dynasty)
August 28	Jodi Carlisle	American actress (The Wild Thornberrys)
September 1	Damon Wayans	American actor, comedian (In Living Color, My Wife and Kids, Lethal Weapon)
September 4	Janice Huff	Chief meteorologist
September 7	Christopher Villiers	Actor
September 9	Hugh Grant	English actor
September 10	Colin Firth	English actor
September 11	Anne Ramsay	American actress (Mad About You)
September 12	Robert John Burke	American actor
September 12	Gregg Fienberg	American producer
September 14	Radames Pera	American actor (Kung Fu)
September 14	Callum Keith Rennie	British-Canadian actor
September 14	Melissa Leo	American actress (All My Children, The Young Riders)
September 15	Lisa Vanderpump	American actress
September 16	Jayne Brook	American actress (Chicago Hope)
September 17	Kevin Clash	Puppeteer (Sesame Street)
September 17	Steve Scully	American journalist (C-SPAN)
September 21	David James Elliott	Canadian actor (JAG)
September 21	Mary Mara	American actress (Law & Order, ER, Nash Bridges) (died 2022)
September 22	Scott Baio	American actor (Happy Days, Charles in Charge, Diagnosis: Murder)
September 27	Christopher Cousins	American actor
September 27	Jean-Marc Barr	French American actor
September 27	María Celeste Arrarás	Puerto Rican television host
September 30	Vincent Waller	American writer
October 1	Elizabeth Dennehy	American actress
October 1	Joshua Wurman	American scientist
October 2	Terence Winter	American writer
October 4	Loren Lester	American actor (Batman: The Animated Series, Defenders of the Earth, W.I.T.C.H.)
October 5	Daniel Baldwin	American actor
October 8	Kerry Ehrin	American writer
October 9	Jane Robelot	American host
October 10	John Beasley	American composer
October 13	Ari Fleischer	American political commentator and former White House Press Secretary (Fox News)
October 13	Richard Sammel	Actor
October 18	Alex Ferrer	Cuban-American judge
October 18	Jean-Claude Van Damme	Belgian actor
October 21	Byron Pitts	American journalist
October 21	Paul Rugg	Television writer and actor (Animaniacs, Freakazoid!, The 7D, Dave the Barbarian, Pig Goat Banana Cricket, Earth to Ned)
October 24	BD Wong	American actor (Oz, Law & Order: Special Victims Unit)
October 24	Ian Baker-Finch	American golfer
October 25	Tom Eplin	American actor (Another World, As the World Turns)
October 28	Mark Derwin	American actor (The Young and the Restless)
November 4	Kathy Griffin	American actress (Suddenly Susan, Kathy Griffin: My Life on the D-List)
November 5	Bryan Lourd	American talent agent
November 5	Tilda Swinton	British actress
November 6	Michael Cerveris	American actor
November 6	Lance Kerwin	American actor (d. 2023)
November 7	José Díaz-Balart	American anchorman
November 8	Michael Nyqvist	Swedish actor (Millennium) (d. 2017)
November 10	Dan Hawkins	American sportscaster
November 11	Stanley Tucci	American actor
November 11	Peter Parros	American actor
November 13	Neil Flynn	American actor (Scrubs, The Middle)
November 14	David Tattersall	British cinematographer
November 17	RuPaul	American actor
November 17	Frank Spotnitz	American writer
November 17	Jonathan Ross	Actor
November 18	Elizabeth Perkins	American actress
November 23	Robin Roberts	American newscaster
November 25	Arthur Smith	Canadian television producer
November 27	Paulina García	Chilean actress
November 29	Jackie Hoffman	American actress
November 30	Rich Fields	American announcer
November 30	Jason Katims	American television writer
December 3	Julianne Moore	American actress
December 3	Daryl Hannah	American actress
December 9	Jeff "Swampy" Marsh	American voice actor and producer (Phineas and Ferb)
December 10	Kenneth Branagh	British actor
December 14	Don Franklin	American actor (The Young Riders, seaQuest DSV, Seven Days)
December 16	Sid Eudy	Professional wrestler (d. 2024)
December 19	Mike Lookinland	American actor (The Brady Bunch)
December 25	Ron Bottitta	British actor (Lost)
December 27	Harry Goaz	American actor (Twin Peaks)
December 28	Jeff Martin	American writer

== Television debuts ==
- Hardie Albright – Thriller
- Jack Pennick – Wagon Train
- Brian Keith - The Westerner

== See also ==
- 1959–60 United States network television schedule
- 1960–61 United States network television schedule
