= Treadway =

Treadway may refer to:

- Treadway (surname)
- Treadway Russell Nash (1724–1811), English clergyman and historian
- Treadway, Tennessee, United States, an unincorporated community
- Treadway Racing, a former auto racing team

== See also ==
- Committee of Sponsoring Organizations of the Treadway Commission
- Treadway bridge, a type of pontoon or floating bridge
- Tredway, a surname
- Treadaway, a surname
