= Bill Jorgensen =

American news anchor (1927–2024)

- Born: August 25, 1927
- Died: March 13, 2024 (aged 96)

William Carl Jorgensen (August 25, 1927 – March 13, 2024) was the founding and longtime anchor of New York City's WNEW-TV's (now WNYW Fox 5) Ten O'Clock News from its inception on March 13, 1967, until he left in the spring of 1979. Jorgensen moved to WPIX-TV, also in New York City, where he anchored the news until his retirement in 1987. He was born in Park Ridge, Illinois.

== The Ten O'Clock News ==
Jorgensen was recruited to WNEW-TV from Cleveland, Ohio, where he had been principal anchor for NBC affiliate KYW-TV (which later became NBC-owned WKYC-TV), and later ABC affiliate WEWS. When WNEW-TV began producing the Ten O'Clock News with Jorgensen at the helm, no other commercial television stations had a prime time newscast, though. The New York Times television critic Jack Gould described the newscast as "a thoroughly professional news summary" due in part to "Mr. Jorgensen's durably pleasing style and demeanor. He suggests authority without affectation." The program was perhaps best known for the station break that preceded the newscast, where Tom Gregory announced: "It's 10 P.M. Do you know where your children are?"

The Ten O'Clock News on WNEW followed a talk show hosted by Merv Griffin and was followed by a local talk show hosted by Alan Burke. Gould described the acerbic Burke as "a piece of sandpaper wired for sound." The Ten O'Clock News rapidly built a substantial audience. Jorgensen was succeeded at WNEW by John Roland, who had previously been a featured reporter and co-anchor. His signature signoff was "I'm Bill Jorgensen, thanking you for your time this time 'till next time."

Jorgensen had it written into his contract at WNEW that he was the only one who could use a Teleprompter, and this meant that when he was debriefing a reporter on set, the reporter would have to constantly look at his notes. By contract, Jorgensen would always look steadily into the camera, projecting an air of power and confidence. He warred bitterly with station management, including Ted Kavanau, then news director, who says Jorgensen "was a difficult guy, very moody, hardly talked to anybody, but when you turned on that camera, he performed brilliantly. He had a voice that was like fate reaching out to you."

== WPIX / Independent Network News ==
Upon leaving WNEW, Jorgensen initially co-anchored Action News with Pat Harper on WPIX. In June 1980, days after Ted Turner began the Cable News Network, WPIX began producing Independent Network News, a prime time national newscast that ran throughout the United States on small independent television stations. The Miami Herald described Independent Network News as a half-hour program of national and international news as well as brief sports and weather segments, offered to participating stations during prime time, and therefore not in direct competition with the networks' evening newscasts. Jorgensen anchored both a 10:00 national newscast and a 10:30 local newscast on WPIX with Steve Bosh and Pat Harper. Tribune Broadcasting hired Morton Dean to replace the three anchors in 1985 and rebranded the program as USA Tonight.

== Retirement and death ==
According to a 2004 Newsday article by Verne Gay, Jorgensen was living in Florida. He died on March 13, 2024 in Franklin, North Carolina at the age of 96.
