= Pat Harper =

American television journalist

- Born: Patricia Cipollaro; July 3, 1934; New York City, U.S.
- Died: April 3, 1994 (aged 59); Capileira, Spain
- Occupation: Television journalist
- Years active: 1959–1991
- Spouse: Arden DeBrun (divorced) Joe Harper (divorced)
- Children: 3

Patricia Harper (July 3, 1934 – April 3, 1994) was an American television news anchor and reporter, and a fixture for nearly two decades on two New York City television stations. In 1975, she became the first woman to anchor a television news program in New York.

== Career ==
Harper, who grew up in New York, worked at TV stations in Chicago and Philadelphia before making history as the first female news anchor in New York when she joined WPIX in 1975. She was initially paired at the anchor desk with her then husband, Joe Harper, who had anchored the station's nightly newscast since 1973.

Despite a major advertising push, the ratings for Action News remained way behind The 10 O'Clock News on WNEW-TV, and the on-air pairing ended in early 1976, by which time they had been divorced in their private life. Joe Harper summarily retired from broadcasting after his run on WPIX ended (he died in 1983). In 1977, Pat returned to the anchor desk after an overhauling of Action News and the addition of a 7:30 P.M. edition, in addition to the already existing 10 P.M. newscast. Her co-anchor for most of the rest of her run at channel 11 was Steve Bosh, formerly of WCBS-TV. In 1978 Action News was divided into 30-minute programs. Harper and Bosh were co-anchors of the 7:30 p.m. broadcast.

Beginning in 1979, she was paired on the 10:00 p.m.. edition with Bill Jorgensen, who had just left WNEW-TV. In 1980, Harper, Jorgensen and Bosh were named anchors of a new, nationally syndicated newscast called Independent Network News; with that, Pat became the second female co-anchor of a national U.S. news broadcast, four years after Barbara Walters had become the first female co-anchor of a U.S. network evening news program, the ABC Evening News, in 1976.

Following Jorgensen's retirement from the station in 1983, and Bosh's departure in 1984, her co-anchors would include Brad Holbrook and former CBS News reporter/anchor Morton Dean. During her run with WPIX, the station took home two Emmy Awards for outstanding local news coverage, in 1979 and again in 1983.

In 1985, Harper left WPIX for WNBC-TV, where she replaced John Hambrick as Chuck Scarborough's co-anchor on the 6 p.m. edition of News 4 New York. In her years with channel 4, the station won five consecutive Emmy Awards for best local newscast. Harper herself won an Emmy for a special report in which she spent a week on the streets of New York as a homeless bag lady, as part of a look at the homeless problem that was then plaguing the city.

After Harper's run on WNBC ended in 1990, she retired from the news business and moved to Capileira, Spain.

== Death ==
Harper died at her home in Capileira, Spain of a heart attack at age 59. She was survived by three children and five grandchildren.
