= Burning Log =

Canadian television program at Christmas

Burning Log is a television program which airs traditionally on Christmas Eve or Christmas morning on the Shaw Spotlight community channels in Canada, replacing the remainder of the channel's programming for the time frame.

The program is a film loop of a wood fire burning in a fireplace; an unidentified individual can periodically be seen stoking the fire. It airs free of charge, without any commercial interruptions, compared to US fire logs on local stations in that country which do so.

== Origins ==
Burning Log was shot in 1999 by a Shaw Cable staffer named John. It was conceived as a means by which Shaw employees could stay home with their families, instead of working over the holidays.

The original film was shot by John at his home in Victoria, British Columbia.

The video became famous when university students Rodger Banister, Brian Berglund and Paul McTaggart in Victoria staged a mock protest through a fake not-for-profit called BLOWS (Burning Logs of the West Coast Society) after Shaw took it off the air in 2000. The program was both a critical and ratings success, and by popular demand, it has been rebroadcast ever since.

The program is a Canadian counterpart to the older (unrelated) Yule Log (WPIX-TV first aired in 1966).

== Ownership controversy ==
Craig McAllister of North Vancouver has claimed that it was he that shot the video, not John. John prefers to maintain anonymity, but his sister in Victoria confirms that the original Shaw video, which led to the mock protest, and a humorous piece on The Daily Show with Jon Stewart & Steve Carell, was indeed shot by her brother in 1999, as a way to allow Shaw staff to have time off over Christmas. The original video was subsequently replaced by Shaw with another version, which may or may not have been shot by Craig McAllister.

== See also ==
- Yule Log, a similar program in the United States
