= Treadaway =

Treadaway is a surname. Notable people with the surname include:

- Allen Treadaway (born 1961), American politician
- John Treadaway (1914–1993), British boxer
- Harry Treadaway (born 1984) British stage, film and television actor
- Luke Treadaway (born 1984), British stage, film and television actor
- Ray Treadaway (1907–1935), American Baseball player
- Wallace Treadaway (1918–2003), South African cricketer

== See also ==
- Treadway (surname)
- Tredway, a surname
