= Patricia Lopez =

Patricia Lopez or Patricia López may refer to:

- Patricia López (born 1977), Chilean actress and singer
- Patricia Lopez (journalist), reporter for the CW11 Morning News on New York City's WPIX-TV
- Patricia D. Lopez, computer scientist
- Patricia López (swimmer) (born 1956), Argentine swimmer
