= Captain Jack McCarthy =

American journalist (1914–1996)

John Joseph McCarthy (August 13, 1914 - May 23, 1996) was an announcer and host at WPIX, Channel 11 in New York City. He is best known for hosting the broadcast of the New York City St. Patrick's Day parade for 41 years, and as "Cap'n Jack" for hosting WPIX's block of Popeye cartoons in the sixties and early seventies.

== Biography ==
McCarthy was born in Manhattan on August 13, 1914. He graduated Commerce High School in 1932.

McCarthy joined the NBC Radio Network in 1933, first as a page and then as "The Network's youngest staff announcer". He later worked for WABC in New York as a sports and special-events radio broadcaster.

During his career, McCarthy performed in Hollywood and in New York, doing film, radio, and TV. From 1963 to 1972, he was the beguiling Cap'n Jack on WPIX's children's cartoon show Cap'n Jack and Popeye. "No script; I had a ball," said McCarthy. He depended on his abilities as a storyteller to entertain and inform his viewers. In 1963 and 1964 McCarthy also hosted Let's Have Fun after John Zacherle went on to host Chiller Theatre.

McCarthy made appearances at many New York area venues, including Freedomland U.S.A. in The Bronx, to meet and entertain children. At Freedomland, he appeared during the 1962 season with the live Popeye show and the opening of a museum dedicated to the newspaper comic strip Thimble Theatre in which Popeye made his debut during 1929. McCarthy and Popeye are featured in the book Freedomland U.S.A.: The Definitive History (Theme Park Press, 2019).

"Jack McCarthy was the personification of the St. Patrick's Day Parade." He was the anchor of WPIX's coverage of St. Patrick's Day events. Channel 11's annual parade coverage grew out of WPIX's effort to test a new camera and microphone on St. Patrick's Day 1949. Due to audience response, the one hour broadcast was extended to five. McCarthy had prepared by gathering information at the Irish American Historical Society, but eventually ran out of prepared material and adlibbed for much of the broadcast. He retired in the 1970s but continued doing the St. Patrick's Day Parade shows until 1992.

He died on May 23, 1996, from prostate cancer in Scarsdale, New York. He was 81, and is survived by his three daughters, two sons, and one grandchild.
