= Laureano Márquez =

Spanish-born Venezuelan humorist and political scientist

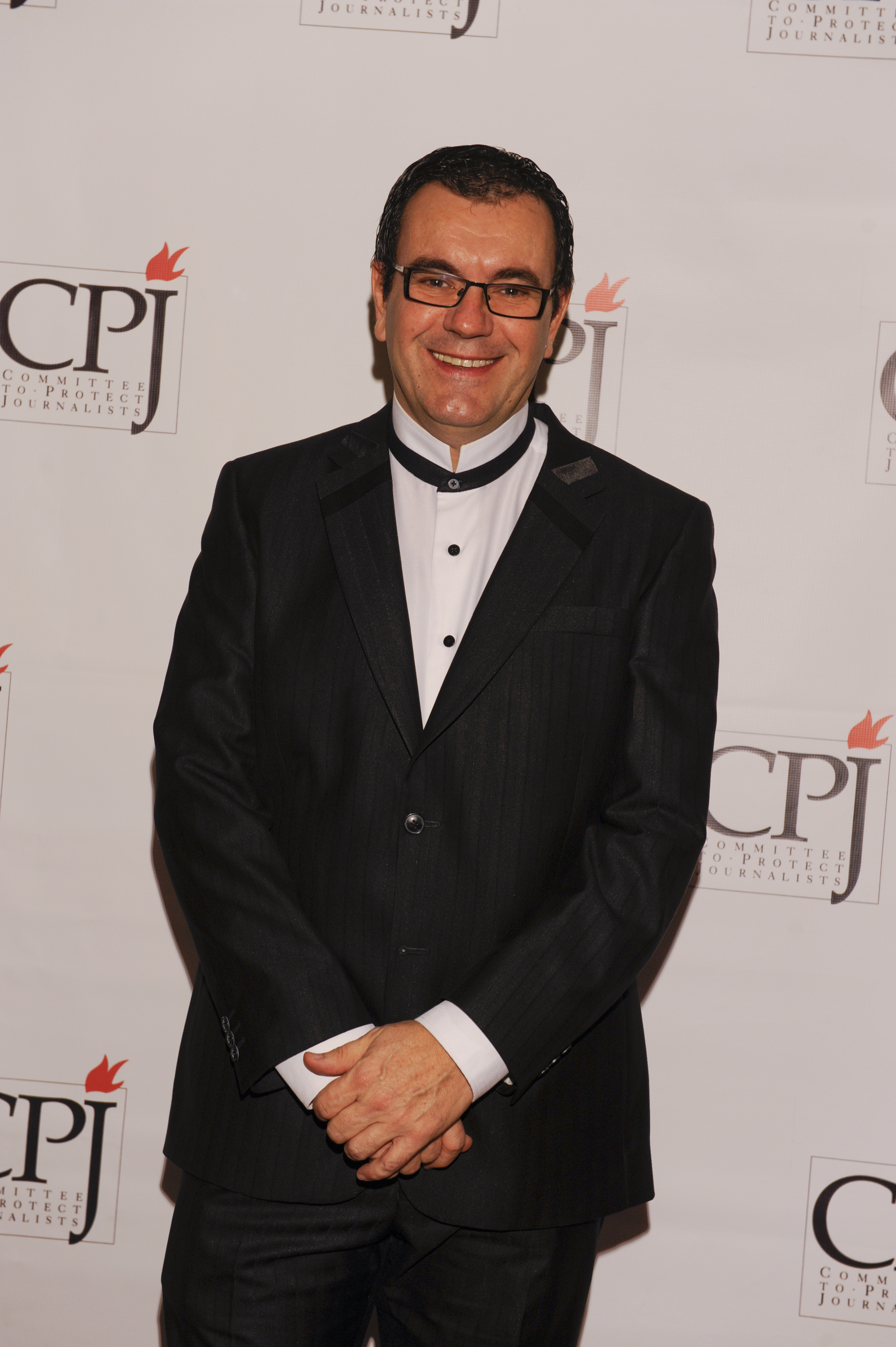
Márquez at the ceremony for the 2010 CPJ International Press Freedom Awards

Laureano Olegario Márquez Pérez (born 4 July 1963 in Canary Islands) is a Spanish-born Venezuelan humorist and political scientist.

== Biography ==
Márquez was born on the Spanish island of Tenerife, one of the Canary Islands, in 1963 and completed a BA (Political Science) the Central University of Venezuela. As an actor, he has played leading roles on radio and television, such as in Radio Rochela, Humor a Primera Vista, and Que Broma Tan Seria, and has written and performed in several plays, including La Reconstituyente, El Pantaletazo, and Laureamor y Emidilio.

He is a writer of columns for several publications, among them the newspapers El Nacional and Tal Cual. He won the El Mejor Artículo Humorístico prize for best humorous article in 2001. He has written the humorous books, 'Se sufre pero se goza, El Código Bochinche and Amorcito corazón.

Known for his use of satire and prose to poke fun at Venezuelan politicians, he was fined in 2007 by local courts after writing a sketch based on a dialogue between Hugo Chávez and his younger daughter.

In 2010, he won an International Press Freedom Award from the Committee to Protect Journalists. The award is given for journalists who show courage in defending press freedom in the face of attacks, threats or imprisonment.

== See also ==
- List of kidnappings

== Bibliography ==
- Gomas, Otrova (2002). Fabricantes de Sonrisas: Antología de Humoristas Venezolanos ("Manufacturers of Smiles: An Anthology of Venezuelan Comedians") (in Spanish). CA: Ediciones Oox. p. 92. ISBN 978-980-6386-28-0.
