= Yule Log (TV program) =

Seasonal television show

- Still frame from the first airing in 1966.
- Created by: Fred M. Thrower
- Theme music composer: Lowell Mason, attr. Georg Friedrich Handel
- Opening theme: "Joy to the World" by Percy Faith and His Orchestra
- Composer: Various
- Country of origin: United States
- Original language: English
- No. of episodes: 41

Production
- Camera setup: Single-camera
- Running time: 3 hours (1966–1969); 3 1/2 hours (1970–1971); 2 hours (1972–1974); 3 hours (1975–1980, 2001–2008); 4 hours (2009–2018); 5 hours (2019)

Original release
- Network: WPIX
- Release: December 24, 1966 – December 25, 1989
- Release: December 25, 2001 – present

External videos
- First hour of 1970 version on YouTube
- Hour long version with original 1966 footage on YouTube

The Yule Log is a television show originating in the United States, which is broadcast traditionally on Christmas Eve or Christmas morning. It originally aired from 1966 to 1989 on New York City television station WPIX (channel 11), which revived the broadcast in 2001. A radio simulcast of the musical portion was broadcast by WPIX-TV's former sister station, WPIX-FM (101.9 FM, now WFAN-FM), until 1988.

The show, which has run between two and four hours in duration, is a film loop of a yule log burning in a fireplace, with a soundtrack of Christmas music playing in the background; it is broadcast without commercial interruption.

== Origins ==
The Yule Log was created in 1966 by Fred M. Thrower, president and chief executive officer of WPIX, Inc. Inspired by an animated Coca-Cola commercial from a year earlier that showed Santa Claus at a fireplace, he envisioned the program as a televised Christmas gift to those residents of New York who lived in apartments and homes without fireplaces. This also provided time for employees of the television station to stay home with their families, instead of working for the usual morning news program.

The original program was filmed at Gracie Mansion, the official residence of the Mayor of New York City, John Lindsay, at the time. An estimated US$4,000 of advertising (along with a roller derby telecast that night) was canceled on Christmas Eve for the show's inaugural airing that day. Thrower, and WPIX-FM programming director Charlie Whittaker selected the music, based largely on the easy listening format that the radio station had then, with the likes of Percy Faith (whose rendition of "Joy to the World" is played at the beginning and the end of the telecast), Nat King Cole, Arthur Fiedler and the Boston Pops Orchestra, Mantovani and the Ray Conniff Singers, among others. During the filming, the producers removed a protective fire grate so that the blaze could be seen better; a stray spark damaged a nearby antique rug valued at $4,000.

The program was both a critical and ratings success, and by popular demand, it was rebroadcast for 23 consecutive years, beginning in 1967. However, by 1969, it was already apparent that the original 16 mm film was quickly deteriorating from wear and needed to be re-filmed. Also, the original loop was only 17 seconds long, resulting in a visibly jerky and artificial appearance. Station producer William Cooper, a future recipient of a Peabody Award, again asked to film the loop at Gracie Mansion, but the mayor's office refused permission. In 1970, WPIX found a fireplace with similar andirons at a residence in California and filmed a burning log on 35mm film there on a hot August day. This version's loop runs approximately six minutes and three seconds.

== Cancellation and revival ==
From 1974 to 1989, a special message by Richard N. Hughes, then the vice president and general manager of WPIX-TV, usually preceded the program, which was broadcast every Christmas Eve or Christmas Day, and sometimes both. In 1977, the program's broadcast on Christmas Eve was followed by WPIX's first-ever live broadcast of Midnight Mass from St. Patrick's Cathedral. In 1978, the program was broadcast for the first time on Christmas morning.

The cost of broadcasting the program without commercial interruption prompted Michael Eigner, who had been appointed as the station's new general manager upon Hughes's retirement, to cancel it in 1990; incidentally that year, director Whit Stillman included a scene of a New Yorker viewing the Log in his movie Metropolitan. Despite being flooded with hundreds of letters protesting the move, WPIX did not broadcast the program, a move that lasted for eleven years, the longest-lasting hiatus for a television special at that time. Beginning in 1997, WPIX offered various versions of The Yule Log on the Internet.

In March 2000, Totowa, New Jersey, resident Joseph Malzone, a longtime fan of The Yule Log, created a Web site named "Bring Back The Log", now named TheYuleLog.com, and administered by Lawrence F. "Chip" Arcuri, petitioning station management to bring back The Yule Log broadcast. In December 2001, WPIX vice president/general manager Betty Ellen Berlamino announced during an appearance on local radio station WPLJ that the special would return to the television station after an eleven-year absence. Berlamino explained that people wanted "comfort food TV" in the aftermath of the September 11 attacks on the World Trade Center. (All-Christmas programming was experiencing a sudden uptick in popularity in 2001, following its nationwide rollout on radio stations.) The digitally restored program was the most-watched television program in the New York metropolitan area on Christmas Day that year and it has continued to be broadcast annually ever since as a result.

Program director Julie O'Neil found the original master film of the 1970 fireplace at WPIX's film archives in Fort Lee, New Jersey. The master film had been misfiled in a Honeymooners film canister marked with the episode title "A Dog's Life", which resulted in a 2006 40th anniversary special about the Log being titled A Log's Life. In 2009, a fourth hour of the program was added, featuring 22 new songs and seven new artists.

On July 29, 2016, a 16 mm print of the original 1966 footage of the Yule Log was discovered amongst a collection of films recovered from the estate of former WPIX executive and producer William Cooper two years prior. The footage contained the unaltered two minute loop of the fireplace, rather than the original broadcast itself with audio.

The discovery had been made by archivist Rolando Pujol while going through the old films in search of footage of (then) presidential candidate Donald Trump. After undergoing digital restoration, WPIX later announced that they would air it on December 24 of that year – exactly 50 years to the day of its debut, making it the first time since 1988 that WPIX aired the Yule Log on Christmas Eve.

It was followed by the live broadcast of Midnight Mass. An encore airing would follow at 7:00 a.m. on December 25, followed by four hours of the 1970 log; a fifth hour of music was compiled for the Christmas morning airing.

== Legacy ==
In 2003, Tribune Broadcasting—then the owner of WPIX—announced that in addition to being broadcast in New York City, The Yule Log would air on television stations that the company owned in other television markets throughout the U.S., and would be remastered for broadcast in high definition. The program made its national debut in 2004 on cable channel Superstation WGN (later WGN America, now NewsNation), at the time serving as the superstation feed of Tribune's flagship station WGN-TV, which broadcast the special in the Chicago market.

In 2008, the Tribune stations aired their own version, with holiday-themed old-time radio programs being played in the background instead of music; this was reverted to the original WPIX version for the 2009 broadcast. WGN America chose not to broadcast The Yule Log in 2010 and 2011, citing the economic infeasibility of devoting several hours to commercial-free programming on a national channel; however, the program was broadcast in the Chicago market by WGN-TV, and by Tribune Broadcasting's other television stations. For the 2010 edition, WPIX and Los Angeles sister station KTLA (channel 5) aired a four-hour broadcast of The Yule Log on Christmas morning. In 2011, Antenna TV, a digital multicast network that Tribune had launched that January, aired The Yule Log for the first time, making the concept available nationwide once again.

In December 2006, to commemorate the program's 40th anniversary, WPIX also aired A Log's Life—a documentary on the history of The Yule Log, narrated by WPIX news anchors Jim Watkins and Kaity Tong. In 2013, WPIX streamed The Yule Log on its website during Christmas Eve, in addition to televising it on Christmas Day. In recent years, Tribune's New Orleans ABC affiliate WGNO-TV (channel 26) has also aired the Yule Log on Christmas Day (the only time in which the station does not air most of its regular newscasts, as ABC airs NBA games on that day), in place of network news programs World News Now and America This Morning, and WGNO's local weekday morning newscast.

In 2019, Tribune merged with Nexstar Media Group, and WPIX was sold to the E. W. Scripps Company to keep Nexstar under regulatory national coverage limits for station owners. (Tribune spun off a handful of other television stations to Scripps and Tegna for similar reasons as well as to resolve ownership conflicts with existing Nexstar stations in certain markets.) Despite the sale, WPIX, along with the Tribune stations acquired by Nexstar, continued to all carry the traditional Yule Log presentation without any changes in 2019. In 2020, Nexstar partner company Mission Broadcasting exercised its option to buy WPIX, through which Nexstar would assume operational responsibilities for the station; the sale was approved by the FCC on December 1, 2020, and was completed on December 30, effectively reuniting the station with most of the former Tribune stations bought directly by Nexstar. The Yule Log was again left intact under the new ownership.

== Digital media ==
According to author Ron Feigenblatt, the WPIX Yule Log presentation inspired his similar digital medium demonstration on the then-young IBM Personal Computer, starting in 1985. At that time, the PC's new Enhanced Graphics Adapter (EGA) finally allowed one to achieve limited, full-color, full-screen, pseudo-continuous, raster-graphics animation on a primitive consumer-grade personal computer, by flipping, during the frame-refresh interval, between four different (synthetic or pre-processed photographic) screen images pre-loaded into the display adapter memory, using a computer application program called PCMOVIE, written at IBM Research and distributed throughout IBM.

== Similar programs ==
Some television stations and cable channels that have broadcast imitations of The Yule Log simulcast the Christmas music from a radio station that is playing it, and before 1989, the WPIX version also secondarily promoted the playing of the same Christmas music in a simulcast over its sister FM station, WPIX-FM (101.9), for those unable to view The Yule Log on television (or for those who wanted to listen to the broadcast in stereo, as stereophonic sound was not standard in television, nor were most television sets equipped with high quality sound systems, until the 1990s).

Other television stations (and cable channels) have spawned imitations. Fellow Tribune station WDCW (then WBDC and now owned by Nexstar) in Washington, D.C. has produced its own version, filming a log burning at Colonial Williamsburg. Local versions were also broadcast by WPWR-TV in Chicago (with music provided by WNUA 95.5 MHz) and KOFY-TV in San Francisco. In the 2000s, Jason Patton—an executive at INHD (later MOJO HD, now defunct), who was inspired as a youth by WPIX's Yule Log—produced his own version, which has been broadcast every Christmas since, via video on demand. Broadcasters as diverse as Oregon Public Broadcasting, the MSG Network (as well as its former competitor, the Empire Sports Network), the CHUM Television group and Télévision Quatre-Saisons in Canada as well as Super RTL in Germany have also borrowed the concept.

WKBW-TV in Buffalo, New York (owned at the time by Granite Broadcasting Corporation, and now owned by Scripps), as a replacement for that day's morning newscast, introduced The Yule Log as a replacement in 2008; it did not return in 2009, but WBBZ-TV (who hired WKBW's former program director and Empire Sports Network's former vice president) brought The Yule Log to their station, where it continues to air annually. KSTC-TV in Minneapolis–Saint Paul, Minnesota (owned by Hubbard Broadcasting) also produces a local version of The Yule Log. The version aired by KTXA (channel 21) in Dallas, Texas beginning in 2013, featured two stockings adorned with the respective logos of KTXA and co-owned classic hits radio station KLUV, which produced the broadcast on its sister television station's behalf. KTXA discontinued the program in 2017, following then-parent CBS Corporation’s sale of KLUV and the rest of CBS Radio's Dallas–Fort Worth station cluster to Entercom; KLUV moved its Yule Log playlist to one of its HD radio feeds for the 2018 edition.

In 2010, Gospel Music Channel (now Up TV) aired a 24-hour broadcast of The Yule Log from 8:00 p.m. Eastern Time on Christmas Eve until 8:00 p.m. Christmas night. Before its conversion to a general children's format in 2017 as Universal Kids, Sprout offered a 12-hour loop called The Sprout Snooze-A-Thon (previously called A Goodnight of Sweet Dreams) during the evening of Christmas Eve, which features scenes of sleeping characters from the network's programming set to soft music to soothe children to sleep before the arrival of Santa Claus.

In its early years, the Home Shopping Network also aired the Yule Log in place of regular programming (the network traditionally does not air live shopping programming on Christmas Day), before switching to a loop of Tampa Bay Area choirs singing Christmas carols and host wishes in subsequent years. QVC also airs a Yule Log every year on December 25 (as with HSN, the network does not air live programming on Christmas). Hallmark Movies & Mysteries airs a version featuring an orange cat and a Jack Russell Terrier, both named "Happy", intended to promote the Hallmark's Pet Project, an initiative of parent company Crown Media Holdings to encourage shelter adoptions and proper pet care. For a period, the Canadian music channel MuchMusic aired a similar special featuring a television in the scene playing Christmas music videos.

ESPN networks have aired college sports-themed versions of the concept, including SEC Network (which is set to the fight songs of Southeastern Conference schools), and Longhorn Network (which aired footage of Texas Longhorns mascot Bevo roaming a ranch to holiday music). In 2016, ESPNU aired A Very Golic Christmas, featuring then-ESPN personality Mike Golic Jr. eating Christmas cookies in pajamas, on a decorated set with a video fireplace.

A great many "video fireplace" productions with a similar format have also been marketed on VHS, DVD and Blu-ray, some of which are entitled Yule Log. The Yule Log program also helped influence the Puppy Bowl, an annual special broadcast by cable network Animal Planet on the day of the Super Bowl.

In 2008, Outback Steakhouse paid homage to The Yule Log by having the first 20 seconds of a 30-second advertisement feature a CGI version of the log, before shifting focus to some steaks. Also in 2008, animation director PES released a free screensaver that reimagined the yule log in the form of food, with pretzels used for the log and candy corn for the flames.

In 2017, 2018, and 2019, the official Twitch channel for the video game Overwatch streamed an Overwatch Yule Log, featuring the game's creative director and then-Blizzard Entertainment vice president Jeff Kaplan sitting in front of a fireplace. The 2017 stream recorded 40,000 concurrent viewers at one point. The stunt was repeated for 2018, featuring guest appearances by Matthew Mercer (voice actor of McCree), and Charlet Chung (voice of D.Va), and professional Overwatch player Jake. Supergiant Games similarly streamed a Hades-themed version of the concept in 2020, using an animation featuring characters from the game.

Actor Nick Offerman released his own version of The Yule Log on December 2, 2015, in the style of his character Ron Swanson, from the television series Parks and Recreation. Offerman pours a glass of Lagavulin single malt scotch whiskey as the yule log fire plays and stares at the camera for 45 minutes. Disney+ released Arendelle Castle Yule Log variant in mid-December 2019 based on the Frozen franchise.

== See also ==
- Burning Log, a similar programme in Canada
- Slow television
