= Jorge Tuero =

Venezuelan actor and comedian

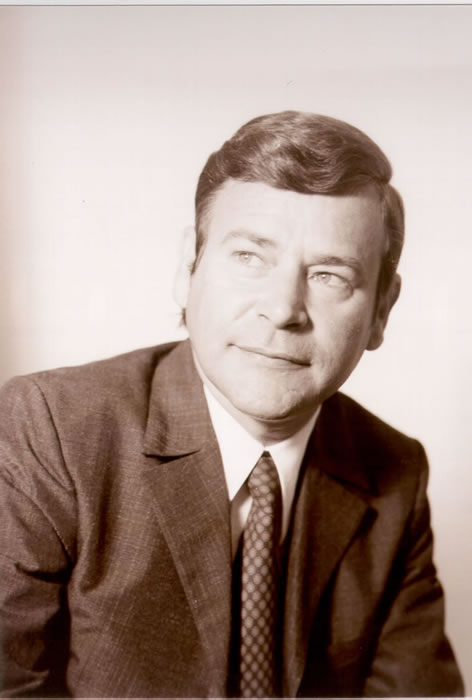
Jorge Tuero

Carlos Alberto Debrot (April 28, 1936 – December 16, 1999), better known by his stage name Jorge Tuero, was a Venezuelan television actor and comedian recognized for his characters in the television programs Cheverísimo and Radio Rochela.

His stage name is the mixture of the names of his two idols, the Mexican actors Jorge Negrete and Emilio Tuero.

== Career ==
He started his career in 1977 as an announcer in Radio Tropical, and later became part of the cast of Radio Rochela, which aired on RCTV. When this station fired him after 15 years of work, Venevisión hired him as part of the cast of the Cheverísimo comedy show. He was considered as one of the most outstanding comedians in Venezuela.

=== Characters ===
- El terror del llano: A man who is known in the Venezuelan plains as the "horror" of the place because of his rough character; however, he always ends up dominated by his wife.
- Rico McRico: Parody of Scrooge McDuck, a poor man who has the fantasy of being extremely rich and makes constant comparisons between the wealthy and poor as a joke, but also as a reflection. It served as a way to juxtapose the lives of poorer Venezuelans as opposed to the rich and famous.
- Juan Pueblito
- El doctor Criollín
- Zanganini
- El Condominio

== Death ==
Tuero, his wife, his daughter, and one granddaughter were part of the countless victims of the Vargas tragedy. On December 16, 1999, around noon his house located in Los Corales, Vargas State, was buried under a massive landslide. His relatives in Caracas warned him to evacuate the house, but he said: This house is 27 years old and I feel more secure in here.
