= Linda Church =

American meteorologist (born 1960)

- Born: June 12, 1960 (age 65)
- Education: University of Florida; University of New Haven
- Occupation: Meteorologist
- Spouse: Jim Dolan (divorced)
- Children: Colleen Dolan, Paul Dolan

Linda Church (born June 12, 1960) is a former morning weather anchor for the WPIX (New York) PIX11, formerly WB11 & CW11, Morning News since its debut in June 2000 until her retirement in January 2017.

Church is a former WPIX weekend weather anchor from 1990 to 1996. From 1987 to 1990 Church worked for WNBC (New York). Church served as the noon weather anchor at WCBS (New York). Church also co-hosted the show Summer Fun for Kids with former WPIX colleague Mat Garcia in June 2003 and with Craig Treadway in July 2007.

== Early career ==
Church began her career in Gainesville, Florida, and went on to work for stations in Cleveland, New Haven, and Charleston.

== Retirement ==
On January 20, 2017, Church announced her retirement from the station.

== Awards ==
- National Academy of Television Arts & Sciences (Emmy Awards)
- Best Morning News Show (WB11 Morning News) – 2000, 2004

== Background ==
Church attended the University of Florida as an undergraduate and the University of New Haven for graduate studies. She has a seal from the American Meteorological Society.
