= WPIX =

Television station in New York City

ATSC 3.0 station

- WPIX Plaza at the Daily News Building
- New York, New York; United States
- Channels: Digital: 11 (VHF); Virtual: 11
- Branding: PIX 11

Programming
- Affiliations: 11.1: The CW; for others, see § Subchannels

Ownership
- Owner: Mission Broadcasting, Inc.
- Operator: Nexstar Media Group via LMA

History
- Founded: April 1947
- First air date: June 15, 1948
- Former call signs: WLTV (CP, 1947–1948)
- Former channel numbers: Analog: 11 (VHF, 1948–2009); Digital: 33 (UHF, 1999–2002, 2004–2009), 12 (VHF, 2002–2004); Translator: W73AP Bronx
- Former affiliations: Independent (1948–1995); The WB (1995–2006)
- Call sign meaning: New York's Picture ("PIX") Newspaper (after nameplate slogan of the Daily News, its founding owner)

Technical information
- Licensing authority: FCC
- Facility ID: 73881
- ERP: 26 kW
- HAAT: 405 m (1,329 ft)
- Transmitter coordinates: 40°44′54″N 73°59′9″W

Links
- Public license information: Public file; LMS
- Website: www.pix11.com

WPIX (channel 11), branded as PIX 11, is a television station in New York City, serving as the de facto flagship of The CW. The station is owned by Mission Broadcasting and operated under a local marketing agreement (LMA) by Nexstar Media Group, which is The CW's parent company. Since its inception in 1948, WPIX has maintained studios and offices in the Daily News Building on East 42nd Street (also known as "11 WPIX Plaza") in Midtown Manhattan. The station's transmitter is located at the Empire State Building.

WPIX is also available as a regional superstation via satellite and cable in the United States and Canada. It is the largest Nexstar-operated station by population of market size.

== History ==
WPIX logos as an independent station

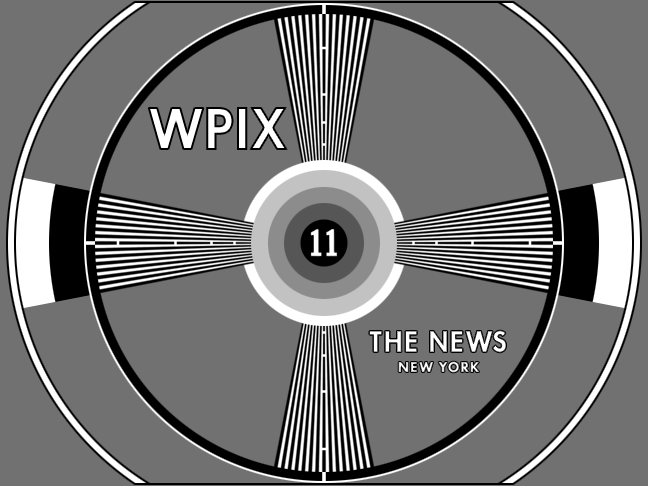
WPIX test pattern, 1949 to 1976

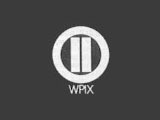
WPIX's Circle 11 logo, used from 1969 to 1976 and 1984 to 1995

The first 11 Alive logo, which was used from 1976 to 1982

=== As an independent station (1948–1995) ===
The station first signed on the air on June 15, 1948; it was the fifth television station to sign on in New York City and was the market's second independent station. It was also the second of three stations to launch in the New York market during 1948, debuting one month after Newark, New Jersey–based independent WATV (channel 13, now PBS member station WNET) and two months before WJZ-TV (channel 7, now WABC-TV). WPIX's call letters come from "New York's Picture ("PIX") Newspaper", the nameplate slogan of its founding owner, the New York Daily News. The Daily News's partial corporate parent was the Chicago-based Tribune Company, publishers of the Chicago Tribune.

Until becoming owned outright by Tribune in 1991, WPIX operated separately from the company's other television and radio outlets (including WGN-TV in Chicago, which signed on two months before WPIX in April 1948) through the News-owned license holder, WPIX, Incorporated—which in 1963, purchased New York radio station WBFM (101.9 FM) and soon changed that station's call sign to WPIX-FM and then to WQCD in 1988. British businessman Robert Maxwell bought the Daily News in 1991. Tribune retained WPIX and WQCD; the radio station was sold to Emmis Communications in 1997 (it is now WFAN-FM, owned by Audacy). WPIX initially featured programming that was standard among independents: children's programs, movies, syndicated reruns of network programs, public affairs programming, religious programs and sports—specifically, the New York Yankees, whose baseball games WPIX carried from 1951 to 1998.

To generations of New York children, channel 11 was also the home of memorable personalities. In 1955, original WPIX staffer and weather forecaster Joe Bolton, donned a policeman's uniform and became "Officer Joe", hosting several programs based around Little Rascals, Three Stooges, and later Popeye shorts. Another early WPIX personality, Jack McCarthy, also hosted Popeye and Dick Tracy cartoons as "Captain Jack" in the early 1960s, though he was also the longtime host of channel 11's St. Patrick's Day parade coverage from 1949 to 1992. WPIX aired a local version of Bozo the Clown (with Bill Britten in the role) from 1959 to 1964; comic performers Chuck McCann and Allen Swift also hosted programs on WPIX during the mid-1960s before each moved to other entertainment work in Hollywood. Jazz singer Joya Sherrill hosted a weekday children's show, Time for Joya (later known as Joya's Fun School). Channel 11 produced the Magic Garden series, which ran on the station from 1972 to 1984. Beginning in the late 1970s and continuing through spring 1982, the station aired "TV PIXX", a television video game show played during commercial breaks of afternoon programs. Kids would call into the station for the chance to control a video game via telephone in hopes of winning prizes.

Another staple of WPIX's programming was its selection of movies; unlike many independent stations, WPIX's library went beyond the usual offerings from major studios and low-budget B-movies, to movies produced by Samuel Goldwyn and imports from Britain. The station also became famous to many area viewers for their various holiday broadcasts of films that became traditions at the station, such as the broadcast of the 1934 movie March of the Wooden Soldiers on Thanksgiving Day. This reputation for film programming (for much of the station's history, a movie ran at 8 p.m. every night in prime time; movies also made up much of the schedule on weekends) became so ingrained that the station frequently promoted itself as being "New York's Movie Station" during the late 1980s and 1990s. Another notable programming stunt was Shocktober, where for the entire month of October, various horror and thriller films were played; this occurred for several years in the early 1990s, and became a cult favorite among area viewers.

From its early years through the 1960s, WPIX, like the other two major independents in New York, WOR-TV (channel 9, now WWOR) and WNEW-TV (channel 5, now WNYW), struggled to acquire other programming. In 1966, WPIX debuted The Yule Log, which combines Christmas music with a film loop of logs burning inside a fireplace. Airing on Christmas Eve and/or Christmas morning initially until 1989, the film was made in 1966 and was shot at Gracie Mansion, with the cooperation of then Mayor John V. Lindsay. WPIX revived the Yule Log due to viewer demand in 2001, and has proven to be just as popular. Several of Tribune's other television stations (as well as WGN America and Antenna TV) have carried the WPIX version, complete with its audio soundtrack, on Christmas morning since the late 2000s, and is also streamed online on WPIX's website. Since 1977, Channel 11 has aired a live broadcast of Midnight Mass from St. Patrick's Cathedral every Christmas Eve.

The station's "Circle 11" logo – predating the existence of the World Trade Center (which was not completed until 1973), which it closely resembled – was first unveiled in 1969 (an advertising billboard for WPIX with the "Circle 11" logo began appearing that year at Yankee Stadium). By the mid-1970s, WPIX emerged as the second highest-rated independent station in the area, behind WNEW-TV. WPIX dropped the "Circle 11" when it rebranded as "11 Alive" in September 1976, though it continued to appear during station editorials until around 1982 (the "Alive" slogan was popularized by such stations as Atlanta's WXIA-TV, which itself has branded as "11 Alive" ever since that point, with the exception of a brief removal in 1995); the "Circle 11" logo returned as part of the "11 Alive" branding in 1984, before being restored full-time in the fall of 1986. Its relaunch featured a series of humorous promos in which a fictional station employee, "Henry Tillman", was searching for a "big idea" for something uniquely New York in nature to serve as the perfect WPIX symbol. The running gag in these ads was that Tillman was constantly surrounded by – but never noticed – objects resembling a giant "11", most notably the Twin Towers of the World Trade Center.

In 1978, WPIX was uplinked to satellite and became a superstation that was distributed to cable providers throughout the U.S. (many providers carried WPIX's signal until the early 1990s, when most systems outside of the Northeastern United States began replacing WPIX with the superstation feed of WGN-TV, though the station continues to be distributed through Dish Network domestically (which since it halted sales of the package to new subscribers in September 2013, is available only to grandfathered subscribers of its a la carte superstation tier) and on most cable and satellite providers throughout Canada). Two years later, WPIX began operating on a 24-hour programming schedule.

During the late 1980s, WPIX fell to sixth place in the ratings among New York's VHF stations, behind WNYW (which was now owned by Fox) and a resurgent WWOR (then owned by MCA–Universal). After president Leavitt Pope stepped down as general manager (though he remained as president and CEO of WPIX), Michael Eigner was transferred from Los Angeles sister station KTLA to become WPIX's general manager in August 1989.

Over the next few years the station engineered a slow turnaround that eventually resulted in WPIX becoming the leading independent station in the market. In 1994, the station became the exclusive home of the New York City Marathon, carrying the event for the next five years. It was during the initial broadcast of that event that WPIX unveiled a stylized serifed "11" logo; the new numerical look eventually became the full-time logo, augmented with The WB's logo after the station affiliated with that network in 1995.

In mid-January 1994, the station began airing the Action Pack programming block with the TV movie TekWar. WPIX earned the biggest ratings of all the stations airing the program, with an 11.7/17 rating.

WPIX logos under WB affiliation

1995-1999

1999-2006

=== WB affiliation (1995–2006) ===
On November 2, 1993, the Warner Bros. Television division of Time Warner and the Tribune Company announced the formation of The WB Television Network. Due to the company's ownership interest in the network (initially a 12.5% stake, before expanding to 22%), Tribune signed the majority of its independent stations to serve as The WB's charter affiliates, resulting in WPIX becoming a network affiliate for the first time upon its January 11, 1995, debut.

The station was verbally branded as "The WB, Channel 11" (simply adding The WB name to the "Channel 11" branding in use since 1986), until it was simplified to "The WB 11" in 1997, and further to "WB11" in 2000. Initially, WPIX's programming remained unchanged, as The WB had broadcast only prime time shows on Wednesday nights at its launch. As with other WB-affiliated stations during the network's first four years, WPIX ran feature films and select first-run scripted series prior to its 10 p.m. newscast on nights when The WB did not offer network programming.

WB network and syndicated daytime programs (such as Maury and Jerry Springer) became more prominent on channel 11's schedule starting in 1996 at the expense of most of its local-interest programming outside of news. By September 1999, when The WB completed its prime time expansion and the network began running its programming Sunday through Friday nights, movies were limited to Saturday evenings and weekend afternoons.

==== September 11 attacks ====
Screencap of the frozen WPIX image from the September 11, 2001, satellite feed

On September 11, 2001, the transmitter facilities of WPIX and several other New York City area television and radio stations were destroyed when two hijacked airplanes crashed into the World Trade Center; both of the complex's main towers collapsed due to fires caused by the impact. WPIX lead engineer Steven A. Jacobson was among those who were killed in the terrorist attack. WPIX's satellite feed froze on the last video frame received from the WTC mast, a replay of the North Tower burning and the start of the impact of the South Tower; the image remained on-screen for much of the day until WPIX was able to set up alternate transmission facilities (the microwave relay for WPIX's satellite feed was also located at the World Trade Center). WPIX also broadcast on W64AA in the interim. Since then, WPIX has transmitted its signal from the Empire State Building.

The station's coverage of the attacks was notable in that WPIX's helicopter was the last to land following a Federal Aviation Administration directive that grounded all aircraft. WPIX was given special permission to continue airing aerial video from its helicopter after the collapse of the World Trade Center, though that permission was not conditioned on WPIX distributing the footage as a pool camera. Footage from WPIX's helicopter was one of many videos used by the National Institute of Standards and Technology in its investigation into the collapse of the World Trade Center complex.

=== CW affiliation (2006–present) ===
WPIX logo, used from September 18, 2006, to November 30, 2008

On January 24, 2006, the Warner Bros. Entertainment unit of Time Warner and CBS Corporation announced that the two companies would shut down The WB and UPN and combine the two networks' respective programming to create a new "fifth" network called The CW. As part of the announcement, Tribune signed ten-year affiliation agreements with the network for 16 of its 19 WB-affiliated stations, including WPIX. Tribune chose not to exercise an ownership interest in The CW. At the time, WPIX was the largest CW affiliate that was not owned by either CBS Corporation or Time Warner, and the largest English-language network-affiliated station that was not an owned-and-operated station of its respective network.

WPIX began transitioning its on-air branding to "CW 11" during the summer of 2006; prior to the start of the station's 10 p.m. newscast on September 17, 2006 (which aired following The WB's final night of programming and the night prior to The CW's official launch), shortly after airing the WB's final sign off bumper featuring stars from the WB's shows, the station aired a video montage of past WPIX logos, starting with a 1948 test pattern and concluding with the official unveiling of the new "CW11" logo.

On April 2, 2007, investor Sam Zell announced plans to purchase the Tribune Company, with intentions to take the publicly traded firm private. The deal was completed on December 20, 2007. Prior to the sale's closure, WPIX had been the only commercial television station in New York City to have never been involved in an ownership transaction (Tribune subsequently filed for Chapter 11 bankruptcy protection in 2008, due to debt accrued from Zell's leveraged buyout and costs from the company's privatization; it emerged from bankruptcy in December 2012 under the control of its senior debt holders Oaktree Capital Management, Angelo, Gordon & Co. and JPMorgan Chase). The station began gradually adopting a modernized "Circle 11" logo in mid-October 2008, featuring a slimmer version of the WB-era "11" (the CW logo is sometimes used next to the "Circle 11", primarily in station promos for CW programs). The station's branding was then changed to "PIX 11" on December 1, 2008 (the "PIX" in the call letters are pronounced phonetically, similar to the word "picks").

On August 17, 2012, Cablevision removed the station from its New York area systems, part of a carriage dispute with Tribune in which WPIX's Hartford, Philadelphia and Denver sister stations were removed from Cablevision's systems in those markets. Cablevision accused Tribune of demanding higher carriage fees (claiming to total in the tens of millions of dollars) for use to help pay off debt, and alleged that it illegally bundled carriage agreements for WPIX and Hartford's WTIC-TV (which was later pulled as well, but unlike co-owned WCCT, was initially unaffected due to a separate carriage agreement); the company denied the claims, stating its approach complied with FCC regulations. The stations and WGN America were restored in an agreement reached on October 26, following a plea by Connecticut State Senator Gayle Slossberg for the FCC to intervene in the dispute.

On May 23, 2016, WPIX owner Tribune Broadcasting and The CW reached a five-year affiliation agreement that renewed the network's affiliations with twelve of Tribune's CW-affiliated stations (including WPIX) through the 2020–21 television season; the deal came after a year-long disagreement between The CW's managing partner CBS Corporation and Tribune concerning financial terms, specifically the amount of reverse compensation that The CW had sought from the group's CW affiliates.

==== Sinclair acquisition attempt and subsequent transactions ====
Sinclair Broadcast Group announced plans to acquire Tribune Media for $3.9 billion on May 8, 2017, plus the assumption of $2.7 billion in Tribune debt. To meet regulatory approval, WPIX was one of several stations identified by Sinclair for divestitures to a third party; Sinclair partner licensee Cunningham Broadcasting was later revealed as the buyer for WPIX-TV with a below market-value $15 million purchase price. Several weeks after that divestment was announced, Sinclair withdrew the resale with intentions to retain WPIX outright. The attempted sale of WPIX—along with Tribune stations in Dallas and Houston—to Cunningham, and in particular a planned sale of WGN-TV to an LLC controlled by a friend of Sinclair executive chairman David D. Smith, resulted in FCC chairman Ajit Pai publicly rejecting the merger. Despite Sinclair abandoning the divestments, the FCC voted to send the merger up for an evidentiary review. Tribune Media moved to terminate the merger outright on August 9, 2018, and filed a breach of contract lawsuit in the process.

Following the Sinclair deal's collapse, Nexstar Media Group agreed to acquire Tribune Media's assets on December 3, 2018, for $6.4 billion in cash and debt. WPIX-TV was then sold by Nexstar to the E. W. Scripps Company for $75 million as part of a series of divestitures totaling $1.32 billion; both transactions were completed on September 19, 2019. Under the terms of the deal, Nexstar was granted an option by Scripps to repurchase WPIX between March 31, 2020, and December 31, 2021. Nexstar partner licensee Mission Broadcasting exercised said option to buy WPIX on July 13, 2020—Nexstar had previously transferred to Mission said repurchase option—for $75 million plus accrued interest. This coincided with Scripps's eventual merger with Ion Media, owner of WPXN-TV. The sale to Mission was approved by the FCC on December 1 and completed on December 30.

On May 20, 2021, Nexstar announced that they renewed affiliations for The CW in 37 media markets, which includes WPIX.

Standalone WPIX logo used since 2017

On March 21, 2024, the FCC ruled Mission's ownership of WPIX to be an illegal circumvention of its ownership limits, due to Nexstar treating the station like its own, and ordered Nexstar to either sell it to an independent third party or sell off some of its other stations to buy WPIX outright. The decision came as local marketing agreements and similar licensing deals came under increased scrutiny by the FCC. Nexstar stated its intent to dispute the ruling, claiming that it had always complied with FCC regulations.

== Programming ==
=== News operation ===
As most stations did in the late 1940s and early 1950s, WPIX aired filmed coverage of news events. The station's first news program, TelePIX Newsreel, was the first in New York City to consist entirely of filmed coverage. From 1948 to 1965, WPIX produced Three Star News, a 6:30 p.m. newscast which employed a three-anchor format—with Kevin Kennedy reading world and national news, John Tillman reporting local stories and Joe Bolton as the weatherman. Bolton was later assigned to host children's programming and was replaced by Gloria Okon. The program was canceled after an FCC complaint that some of Tillman's "man on the street" interviews were staged with paid actors, most notable of which was a "pro-Castro sympathizer", who was "interviewed" with a copy of the Daily Worker newspaper conveniently tucked under his arm.

WPIX produced the Independent Network News, a national newscast that was syndicated to independent stations from June 1980 to June 1990. The program – whose live feed was transmitted nationally weeknights at 9:30 p.m. (ET) – featured the same on-air staff as channel 11's newscasts and was broadcast from the same news studio, with INN logos covering the station's own logo on various set pieces. In New York City, WPIX paired a 10 p.m. replay of the national news with a live local newscast at 10:30 pm, called the Action News Metropolitan Report. As part of a midday expansion of INN, starting in 1981, channel 11 also launched a newscast at 12:30 pm. During the decade, WPIX also produced two other programs syndicated to stations that carried the INN program: the business-oriented Wall Street Journal Report; and From the Editor's Desk, a Sunday news discussion program hosted by Richard D. Heffner, host of the long-running public-affairs program The Open Mind.

WPIX was also noted for the many post–news editorials that were delivered by Richard N. Hughes, vice president of news operations from 1969 to 1995. His editorials ended with the tagline "What's your opinion? We'd like to know." Periodically, he would read excerpts from viewers' letters in response to the editorials, invariably closing each excerpt by saying, "And that ends that quote." In 1984, the station renamed its local and syndicated news programs as The Independent News. In 1986, the national INN newscast was renamed USA Tonight and aired at 10 pm, while the 7:30 p.m. program retained the Independent News title and the 10:30 p.m. local newscast was renamed New York Tonight. When INN was canceled, the 7:30 p.m. program ended as well, and WPIX focused its efforts on the 10 p.m. newscast.

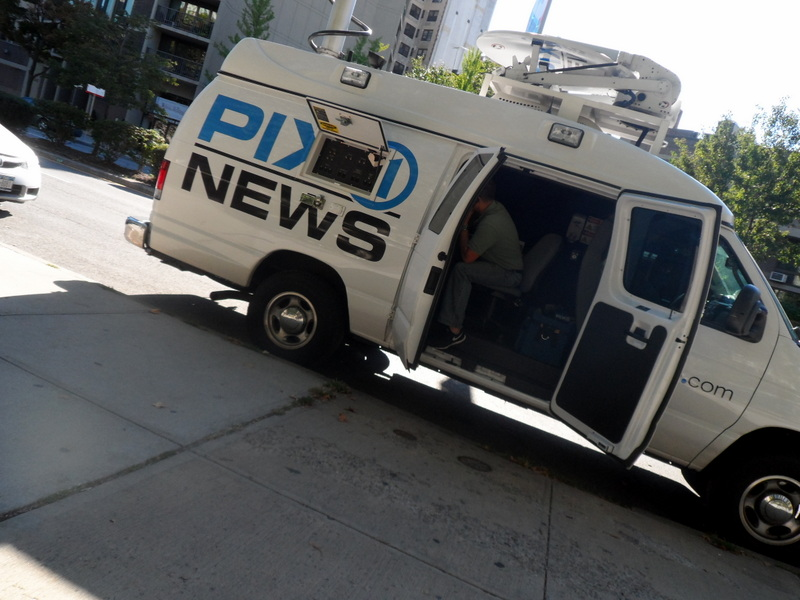
A WPIX news van in Brooklyn

Over the years, channel 11 has won many news awards and was the first independent station to win a New York area Emmy award for outstanding newscast, first earning the statuette in 1979 and again in 1983. It was a significant comeback for a news operation that was accused of falsifying news reports in the late 1960s, such as labeling stock footage as being shown "via satellite", and claiming a voice report was live from Prague when it had actually been made from a pay telephone in Manhattan. As a result, Forum Communications—led by future PBS and NBC News president Lawrence K. Grossman—approached the Federal Communications Commission to challenge WPIX Inc.'s license to operate channel 11. WPIX and the Daily News prevailed in 1979 after years of litigation. Concurrent with the challenge to its license, WPIX began airing nine public-service programs in mid-1969, including Puerto Rican New Yorker, Black Pride, Suburban Closeup, Focus New Jersey, Everywoman, Rendezvous, Jewish Dimension, Sesame Street, and The Green Thumb.

On June 5, 2000, WPIX launched a weekday morning newscast, the WB11 Morning News (now the PIX 11 Morning News), which has grown to challenge the established network morning programs as well as its more direct competitor, WNYW's Good Day New York.

On April 26, 2008, WPIX became the fourth television station in New York City to begin broadcasting its local newscasts in high definition. The station resumed a half-hour early evening newscast on September 14, 2009, that ran nightly at 6:30 pm, until it was replaced by syndicated reruns on June 27, 2010. Three months later, on September 11, the station launched a weekend evening 6 p.m. newscast (making WPIX one of the few U.S. television stations to carry an early evening newscast on weekends, without an existing weekday news program in that daypart). On September 20, 2010, WPIX expanded its weekday morning newscast to five hours, with the addition of an hour at 4 am.

On October 11, 2010, newly appointed news director Bill Carey instituted controversial format changes for the newscasts in an attempt to boost the station's ratings. Carey made the newscasts flashier than they had previously been; Kaity Tong and Jim Watkins were replaced as anchors of the weeknight 10 p.m. broadcasts by Jodi Applegate, and multiple commentators and an edgy graphics and music package were introduced. The revamped newscast's first week was not well received by most viewers or critics, with the station fielding numerous complaints through phone calls, emails and Facebook comments, as well as a scathing review in the Daily News. A Facebook page was created calling for Tong and Watkins's return to the 10 pm news. WPIX's sports department was shut down in March 2011, with sports segments being reduced to a two-minute feature presented by the station's news anchors. In September 2011, WPIX relieved Watkins of his duties as weekend anchor, replacing him with Tong (who now solo anchors the 5, 6 and 10 p.m. newscasts on Saturdays and Sundays). By late 2011, the station's newscast ratings would fall to last place. Carey, who stepped down on October 3, 2012, was replaced as news director by Mark Effron in April 2013.

On September 12, 2011, WPIX restored an early evening newscast to its weeknight schedule with the debut of an hour-long 5 p.m. broadcast, which was originally aimed at women between the ages of 18 and 49. On December 19, 2012, Jodi Applegate left WPIX, to prepare for the birth of her child through a gestational surrogate. Morning anchor Tamsen Fadal was later named her replacement; the station later restored a two-anchor format with the hiring of WNBC sports anchor Scott Stanford as Fadal's co-anchor on the 5 pm and 10 pm newscasts in September 2013. In March 2014, WPIX hired consumer reporter Arnold Diaz (who was fired by WNYW two months earlier due to the shutdown of its consumer investigative unit) to head up a new four-person investigative unit. On April 5, 2014, WPIX moved its weekend early evening newscast one hour earlier, from 6 to 5 pm.

On April 23, 2014, the station debuted a new graphics package during its 5 p.m. newscast (the opening sequences used in this package had previously debuted in January 2014, but were updated with the revamp); along with the change, the station brought back Non-Stop Music's "WPIX Custom News Package", which had previously been used as the theme for WPIX's evening newscasts from 1993 until the 2010 format change. On June 9, the station reduced the morning newscast to four hours (with the 4 a.m. hour replaced with syndicated programs) to allow the station "the flexibility to invest more resources into the key morning hours". On July 14, 2014, John Muller (who joined WPIX in 1999 and served as anchor of the morning newscast from its launch until he left for ABC News in 2011) returned to the station as evening co-anchor; Scott Stanford was reassigned to lead sports anchor (as part of a gradual reformation of the sports department that included the launch of the highlight program PIX11 Sports Desk).

During the July 2014 ratings period and again during the August 2014 ratings period, WPIX beat WNYW and WNBC, earning third place in ratings only behind WABC and WCBS in the 5 p.m. timeslot among adults 25–54 (as well as in certain other demographics) for the first time since 2011; it was the only newscast in the market to make year-to-year gains in key demographics. WPIX's newscasts also saw increases in the morning and at 10 pm in the 25–54 demographic.

On April 20, 2015, WPIX debuted a 6 p.m. newscast on weekdays with current evening anchors John Muller and Tamsen Fadal. On December 8, 2015, WPIX announced the hiring of former WWOR anchor Brenda Blackmon, and the addition of a new 6:30 p.m. program, to rival the network news on the other main stations. Kaity Tong and Blackmon began anchoring the broadcast on January 11, 2016. The 6:30 p.m. newscast was canceled in September 2016.

On April 13, 2016, WPIX made an announcement of more anchor changes preceding May Sweeps. This includes Scott Stanford moving from evening sports anchor to morning news anchor with Sukanya Krishnan. Kori Chambers, formerly on the morning show, and weekend evenings, will co-anchor with Tamsen Fadal on the weekday 5 p.m. version and handle political coverage for the station. Andy Adler, who handled weekend sports duties, will become the primary sports anchor. In addition, Kala Rama and Craig Treadway, who anchored on the weekends, will now anchor the first portion of the morning news (5–6 a.m.).

In May 2017, WPIX once again revamped its anchor lineup. The station announced that former CBS Morning News and Early Today anchor Betty Nguyen would become part of the morning news team along with a returning Dan Mannarino, with Scott Stanford once again returned to anchoring sports for the evening broadcasts. In addition, WPIX announced that it would begin featuring traffic reports from WCBS radio's Tom Kaminski, who reports from the radio station's helicopter as he does every weekday; when he files his television reports the helicopter is referred to as "Air 11".

Until the show's cancellation in spring 2022, WPIX's news studio was the home base for the daily syndicated entertainment news series Daily Mail TV from CBS Media Ventures, which WPIX carried locally. This was done to avert a costly remodeling of the Daily Mail New York bureau for television operations. WPIX only contributed technical staff to the series, and Daily Mail TV was taped using removable logos which overlay WPIX's logos on the set during 'dark' time for the studio (in breaking news situations during Daily Mail TV tapings, WPIX originated coverage from its newsroom instead).

In January 2020, WPIX expanded its morning newscast to include the 9 a.m. hour. On September 14, 2020, WPIX added an hour-long 10 a.m. newscast, becoming New York's only 10 a.m. newscast; the newscast now runs from 4 a.m. to 10 a.m.

=== Sports programming ===
Since 1999, the station has been the over-the-air broadcast partner of the New York Mets. Prior to 1999, the Mets had spent their entire televised history (since 1962) with (W)WOR. WPIX, since 2013, has also simulcast some ESPN Monday Night Football telecasts involving the Giants or Jets by arrangement with WABC-TV, the main local rightsholder for the over-the-air simulcasts. WPIX has also carried NFL Network Thursday Night Football telecasts involving the Giants or Jets (mostly prior to the NFL's decision to simulcast most Thursday night games on CBS, NBC, or Fox).

WPIX served as the longtime over-the-air television broadcaster of New York Yankees baseball from 1951 to 1998. Mel Allen served as the primary announcer for the broadcasts, Red Barber from 1954 to 1966, Phil Rizzuto from 1957 to 1996, and Bobby Murcer from 1997 to 1998. With his "Holy Cow!" catchphrase, Rizzuto became popular especially through the 1970s. WPIX lost the broadcast rights for the Yankees to WNYW in 1998, more so the result of regional cable sports networks (in this case, MSG) gaining team broadcast rights, leaving broadcast stations with fewer games to air. In 2015, the Yankees returned to WPIX after a 17-year absence, having picked up YES Network's package of over-the-air Yankees broadcasts, replacing WWOR-TV. These games co-existed with WPIX's existing Mets broadcasts (produced by SportsNet New York). In 2022, these games left WPIX for Amazon Prime Video.

At various points, WPIX also aired Major League Baseball's New York Giants, the New York Football Giants and New York Jets, the NHL's New York Rangers, the MISL's New York Arrows and local college basketball.

WPIX also aired professional wrestling from 1984 to 1991 from various companies such as Pro Wrestling USA, AWA All Star Wrestling, UWF, NWA/WCW Worldwide and Pro, GLOW and briefly WWF (now WWE) from late 1998 to early 1999 (during its affiliation with The WB). In later years, professional wrestling would return to WPIX by way of WWE's secondary flagship television program SmackDown!, which aired on the station from 2006 to 2008 (as a CW affiliate).

In March 2017, it was announced that WPIX would air selected New York Cosmos soccer games beginning in the 2017 season.

In 2021, WPIX aired two Brooklyn Nets playoff games. The Nets' usual network, YES, was airing a Yankees game instead.

==== Notable current on-air staff ====
- Ben Aaron – anchor; New York Living host
- Marysol Castro – anchor, New York Living host
- Chris Cimino – meteorologist, New York Living Host
- Kendis Gibson – anchor
- Irv "Mr. G" Gikofsky – meteorologist
- Allison Kaden – general assignment reporter
- Jill Nicolini – fill in traffic/entertainment anchor

==== Notable former on-air staff ====
- Craig Allen (AMS Seal of Approval) – meteorologist (2010–2020)
- Ernie Anastos – Positively America host
- Jodi Applegate (2010–2012)
- Brenda Blackmon
- Remy Blumenfeld
- Joe Bolton
- Sharon Carpenter (2010–2011)
- Jack Cafferty (1992–1998)
- Jason Carroll
- Julie Chang
- Linda Church (1990–2017)
- Morton Dean (1985–1987)
- Vince DeMentri
- Laurie Dhue
- Arnold Díaz – investigative reporter
- Tom Ellis – host of NewsWorthy
- Amber Lee Ettinger
- Tamsen Fadal (2008–2023)
- Emily Frances (2001–2010)
- Shon Gables
- Jerry Girard (1974–1995)
- Donna Hanover (1983–1990)
- Pat Harper (1975–1985)
- Cathy Hobbs (1997–2009)
- Richard N. Hughes
- Jackie Hyland (2000–2005, 2007–2011)
- Bill Jorgensen (1979–1987)
- Marvin Kitman (1973–1974)
- Sukanya Krishnan (2001–2003, 2005–2017)
- Shari Lewis
- Lionel (2009–2015)
- Lynda Lopez
- Patricia Lopez
- Jeffrey Lyons (1970–1991)
- Sal Marchiano (1995–2008)
- Chuck McCann
- Jack McCarthy
- Myles Miller (2015–2017)
- Byron Miranda
- Kaitlin Monte (2014–2016)
- John Muller
- Felonious Munk (2011–2012)
- Melinda Murphy (2000–2002)
- Shimon Prokupecz (2004–2009)
- Sally Jessy Raphael
- Frances Rivera (2011–2013)
- Bobby Rivers (1986–1987)
- Tim Ryan
- Bonnie Schneider
- Toni Senecal (2001–2005)
- Eric Shawn
- Joya Sherrill (1970–1982)
- Scott Stanford (2013–2019)
- David Susskind
- Allen Swift
- Peter Thorne (2001–2011)
- Kaity Tong
- Craig Treadway
- Jim Watkins (1998–2011)

=== Public affairs and special events ===
WPIX specialized in public affairs and special event programming, inspired by its roots under the ownership of the Daily News. Early on, it offered the first in-depth program to look at New York City government, City Hall. WPIX children's show personality Jack McCarthy anchored the station's coverage of the annual St. Patrick's Day Parade; the station later added the Columbus Day and National Puerto Rican Day Parade to its stable of events. Later on, the station produced Essence, a series inspired by Essence magazine and hosted by the magazine's chief editor, Susan L. Taylor. The station also aired the Macy's 4th of July Fireworks event beginning in 1983. Along with the New York City Marathon, these events moved to WNBC (channel 4) after the station joined The WB. Since 2000, the Macy's fireworks event has been carried nationally on NBC, while WABC-TV (locally) and ESPN2 (nationally outside the New York City area) broadcast the Marathon.

Special guest Coby Kranz was invited onto the daily news segment on his 11th birthday, because he was one of the only people to turn 11 on 11/11/11.

Editor's Desk host Richard D. Heffner served as host of The Open Mind, which was produced by WPIX (and was concurrently aired on PBS member stations), before moving to other New York studios. Since 1992, WPIX has produced PIX News Closeup (hosted by WPIX senior correspondent Marvin Scott since its debut), a half-hour public affairs and interview program on Sunday mornings that focuses on domestic and international issues in the news, and discussions on political issues.

== Technical information ==
=== Subchannels ===
The station's ATSC 1.0 channels are carried on the multiplexed signals of other New York City television stations:

Subchannels provided by WPIX (ATSC 1.0)
Subchannel	Res.	Short name	Programming	ATSC 1.0 host
11.1	720p	PIX11	The CW	WABC-TV
11.2	480i	ANTENNA	Antenna TV	WXTV-DT
11.4	480i	REWIND	Rewind TV	WXTV-DT

Subchannel broadcast with MPEG-4 video

=== Analog-to-digital conversion ===
WPIX ended regular programming on its analog signal, over VHF channel 11, at 12:30 p.m. on June 12, 2009, as part of the federally mandated transition from analog to digital television. The station's digital signal relocated from its pre-transition UHF channel 33 to VHF channel 11. WCBS-TV took over the channel 33 allocation as it moved its digital signal from channel 56 as a result of the phaseout of channels 52–69.

On January 1, 2011, Tribune launched its new digital broadcast network, Antenna TV, which affiliated with WPIX through a new fourth digital subchannel. In May 2012, WPIX moved Antenna TV to digital subchannel 11.2, while digital channel 11.4 was removed (Estrella TV, which was carried on 11.2 at the time, is now affiliated with Port Jervis low-power station WASA-LD, which is owned by the network's parent company Estrella Media). 11.4 returned to the air in 2018 as an affiliate of TBD. On September 1, 2021, 11.4 switched to Nexstar–owned classic network Rewind TV. On October 28, 2019, Court TV launched on 11.3, replacing This TV. On April 1, 2023, 11.3 switched to Grit.

=== ATSC 3.0 lighthouse service ===
Subchannels of WPIX (ATSC 3.0)
Subchannel	Res.	Short name	Programming
7.1	1080p	WABC	ABC (WABC-TV)
11.1	1080p	WPIX-HD	The CW
11.2	1080p	Ant TV	Antenna TV
11.4	1080p	Rewind	Rewind TV
41.1	1080p	WXTV	Univision (WXTV-DT)
