= Independent Network News (TV program) =

American syndicated TV news program

- Also known as: INN: The Independent News (1984–1987); USA Tonight (1987–1990)
- Genre: News program
- Created by: John Corporon; Leavitt Pope
- Presented by: Bill Jorgensen (1980–1983); Steve Bosh (1980–1984); Pat Harper (1980–1985); Brad Holbrook (1984–1985; 1988–1990); Morton Dean (1985–1988); Shelia Stainback (1985–1990)
- Opening theme: "Industrial Power" by Johnny Pearson (1980–1984); "Independent Network News Theme" by Rick Krizman (1984–1987); "USA Tonight" by Michael Karp (1987–1990)
- Country of origin: United States
- Original language: English
- No. of seasons: 10

Production
- Production locations: Daily News Building, New York City
- Camera setup: Multi-camera
- Running time: 30 minutes
- Production companies: WPIX; Tribune Broadcasting

Original release
- Network: Syndication
- Release: June 9, 1980 – June 23, 1990

The Independent Network News (INN) (later retitled INN: The Independent News and USA Tonight) is an American television news program that aired in syndication from June 9, 1980, to June 23, 1990. The program aired seven nights a week on various independent stations across the United States and was designed to serve those stations in the same manner that the "Big Three" network news programs – ABC World News Tonight, NBC Nightly News and the CBS Evening News – served their affiliates.

== History ==
The program debuted on June 9, 1980, under its original title Independent Network News. The newscast is a production of Tribune Broadcasting's New York City station WPIX, and was distributed by Tribune's syndication division as one of the first programs that the company produced for the syndication market. As INN was produced at WPIX, that station's on-air news staff presided over the broadcast. The nightly broadcast was helmed by a three-anchor team consisting of Pat Harper, Bill Jorgensen and Steve Bosh, with Jerry Girard reporting on sports and Roberto Tirado providing national weather forecasts (Tirado would later be replaced by Bob Harris); WPIX's local reporting staff was also utilized for the program. Saturday and Sunday editions of INN were introduced in October 1980; these were initially anchored by Ted O'Brien.

INN also used reports from its member stations, the Associated Press, United Press International, Visnews, and later CNN to supplement its own coverage. WPIX transmitted the national show's live feed via satellite—initially via Westar 3—at 9:30 p.m. Eastern Time each night. (Most stations that carried the program aired INN 30 minutes to one hour after the initial feed.) In the New York City area, WPIX paired a replay of the national INN broadcast at 10 p.m., with its own local newscast at 10:30, called the Action News Metropolitan Report. The newscast carried three minutes of national advertising and three minutes for local ads.

As part of a midday expansion of INN starting in September 1981, WPIX also experimented with a half-hour midday newscast at 12:30 p.m. that was co-anchored by Marvin Scott and Claire Carter; this followed the national broadcast which aired at noon. During the decade, WPIX also offered the business-oriented news program The Wall Street Journal Report (which continues to air today in syndication and also airs on CNBC, albeit under the name of On the Money); and the Sunday newsmaker show From the Editor's Desk, hosted by Richard D. Heffner, to stations carrying INN.

Bill Jorgensen left the program (and WPIX) in 1983. Bosh and Harper continued to anchor together for another year until Bosh departed in October 1984 to join KDFW-TV in Dallas. Brad Holbrook, who joined the operation a year earlier after anchoring at WNAC-TV/WNEV-TV in Boston, became co-anchor with Harper. Also on March 12, 1984, WPIX dropped its Action News branding for the station's local newscasts and decided to rebrand its 7:30 and 10:30 p.m. newscasts as INN: The Independent News, which was concurrently adopted as the title of the national program. The midday newscast continued (now under the title of INN: Midday Edition) until September 1985, when it was replaced by the lighter-toned Inday News, which focused upon consumer news and human interest stories. Donna Hanover, who was already anchoring the local 7:30 WPIX newscast, anchored this newscast alongside Brad Holbrook (Marvin Scott, meanwhile, was reassigned to anchor the weekend editions of the national broadcast), which was part of a syndicated block called Inday, a co-venture of Tribune, LBS Communications and Columbia Pictures Television, designed to provide stations with a two-hour block of news and "infotainment"; Inday was cancelled after only one season, ending in September 1986.

In January 1985, Tribune signed veteran CBS News correspondent Morton Dean to anchor both the national Independent News broadcast and the late WPIX newscast. Pat Harper would leave WPIX and INN in the spring of 1985, after being hired as the 6 p.m. co-anchor at New York's NBC owned-and-operated station, WNBC-TV; Sheila Stainback, formerly of WBAL-TV in Baltimore, was brought in to replace her alongside Dean. Harper's place on the 7:30 local broadcast was given to Donna Hanover, with Holbrook as co-anchor.

Beginning on January 12, 1987, the national INN newscast was renamed USA Tonight, keeping that name for the remainder of its run although the INN name and logo was still used in graphics. An increased focus was placed on features in the retitled program, and Dean began anchoring the program by himself. A year after the new format was implemented, Dean left Tribune for ABC News and a returning Brad Holbrook took the anchor position on weeknights. Stainback would eventually return as his co-anchor, with both of them continuing to anchor the local newscast that followed.

The weekend editions of USA Tonight were discontinued after Marvin Scott was reassigned to WPIX in 1989; he and Mary Garofalo were named anchors of WPIX's local newscast, which moved to 10 p.m. as the lead-in for USA Tonight at 10:30. Holbrook remained as anchor of the national broadcast through all of this, while Stainback initially anchored alongside him before being moved to weekends.

By 1990, it was clear that Tribune's nationally syndicated newscast was not much longer for television. Far fewer stations had been airing USA Tonight as the 1980s advanced, with some choosing to focus on their own news divisions and others choosing to affiliate with either one of the major networks or the fledgling Fox network. With this in mind, Tribune Broadcasting entered into a collaborative agreement with CNN, which essentially made the then-six station Tribune group news affiliates of the then-Turner Broadcasting System cable channel. The final INN newscast aired on June 23, 1990; through its initial deal with CNN, Tribune retained some of the program's staff as Tribune Broadcasting's Washington, D.C. bureau. On March 13, 2009, Tribune Broadcasting officially closed the Washington bureau as an effect of the Great Recession and the sale of Tribune to Sam Zell afflicting the company with a heavy debt burden which required severe company cutbacks.

== Distribution ==
When INN premiered, the program aired on Tribune's three television stations at the time—WPIX, WGN-TV in Chicago, and KWGN-TV in Denver—and 21 other outlets at launch, a number that rose from 24 stations to 41 before the end of 1980. By the start of 1983, INN was being aired by 78 stations.

For its entire ten-year run, Independent Network News was also distributed nationally over the superstation feed of WGN-TV (now operating as cable news channel NewsNation). The program was packaged into the second half-hour of WGN's late-evening newscast, which adopted a hybrid local-national format upon INN's debut (three months after the newscast was moved one hour earlier to 9 p.m.); WGN also aired INN as a standalone broadcast following its late night movie presentations. (WGN and other news-producing independents that aired the program like WPIX, KWGN-TV and KMSP-TV in Minneapolis–St. Paul, which were distributed as regional superstations in their respective regions of the U.S., expanded their local prime time newscasts to one hour after USA Tonight ceased production.) INN, by then renamed USA Tonight, was also broadcast on The Learning Channel from September 1987 to June 1990.

== See also ==
- The National News Desk – a syndicated daily newscast distributed by Sinclair Broadcast Group to its owned and managed stations since 2021
