= Richard N. Hughes =

American television executive and television station editorialist

Richard Norman Hughes (March 1, 1927 in Michigan – October 9, 2004 in Durham, North Carolina) was an American television executive and television station editorialist.

== Early career ==
Hughes began his career in 1950 as an assistant account executive in a Detroit advertising agency. Over the years, he moved up the ranks to Radio and Television Director, supervising all broadcasting aspect for agency clients, and working as a writer, producer, director and commercial spokesman. He wrote over 100 musical commercials for his clients over his ten years with the firm.

In 1960, Hughes left the advertising field and became involved in the start-up of Detroit classical music station WQRS (now WMGC-FM). During his time there, he won awards from the Associated Press for news commentary, and from the University of Detroit for program excellence.

== To television ==
In 1963, Hughes moved to the television side of the business when he joined WXYZ-TV as Director of Advertising and Community Affairs. While at the station, he produced and narrated two major sales presentations which won successive sales promotion awards from the National Association of Broadcasters. They also attracted the notice of WPIX in New York City, which he first joined in 1968 as Director of Sales Development.

== "What's your opinion? We'd like to know." ==
In 1969, less than a year into his stint with WPIX, he began delivering on-air editorials for the station. Over the next 26 years – serving at various points as Vice President of Community Affairs, Vice President/general manager, and Senior Vice President – Hughes essentially became the face and voice of WPIX, and was dubbed "The Dean of Television Editorialists in New York City." His closing catch phrase, "What's your opinion? We'd like to know," became familiar to generations of New Yorkers, as well as becoming a permanent part of the lexicon. He also read letters from viewers on various editorials, under the heading of "WPIX Editorial Feedback." After finishing each letter, he would conclude with, "And that ends that (comment/excerpt/opinion/quote)."

During the 1970s, when WPIX was fighting to survive amid a long and costly license challenge, Hughes' editorials reached a peak. They were shown 28 times a week, including during 10 prime time spots a week, and were seen by an average of more than 1½ million viewers. Several of his editorials were reprinted in such publications as the Congressional Record, The Christian Science Monitor and other local newspapers and magazines. One editorial even served as the basis for an Op-Ed column in The New York Times, and another was cited in a brief before the U.S. Supreme Court. Hughes won several Emmy Awards for his editorials, as well as numerous awards from such organizations as the New York State Broadcasters Association and San Francisco State University. He served for several years as a trustee of the National Academy of Television Arts and Sciences.

Hughes also produced and narrated hour-long documentaries for WPIX, called Editorial Report. One of them, "The Lifer's Group: I Am My Brother's Keeper", won a Peabody Award in 1977. It was the first television program to introduce the public to the work of the Lifer's Group at Rahway State Prison (now East Jersey State Prison) with juvenile offenders; one year later, the subject was picked up and made famous nationwide through an unaffiliated production company's "Scared Straight!"

In addition to his editorials, Hughes delivered a Christmas message that aired prior to the start of The Yule Log. Two versions of the message were recorded, both of them depicting Hughes surrounded by a wreath of holly, and backed by an instrumental version of Silent Night. The messages were recorded in 1974 and 1979; the latter version aired until WPIX dropped The Yule Log in 1989.

Hughes retired from active station management in 1982, though he continued to deliver editorials for channel 11 until his final retirement from the station in 1995, with his last editorial airing on December 31 of that year.

== Later years ==
After retiring from active management at WPIX, Hughes moved to Durham, North Carolina, and founded a telephone ministry called The Church of One-at-a-Time. He also taught Bible study and Scripture at Duke University and other places. In 2001, he wrote a book called The Book of Genesis, and had his own web magazine called The Blockhead Journal.

He continued to be involved in the public affairs side of television, both contemporaneous with his WPIX editorial duties and after his final departure from that station. He hosted public affairs shows for WLFL and documentaries for WTVD. Hughes was married twice to the former Margo Rundles. After remarrying, he quipped, "We were divorced, but it just didn't work out." He also was father to two daughters from a previous marriage, one an artist and author and the other an ordained minister.

== Death ==
He died in Durham, North Carolina, aged 77.
