= Radio Rochela =

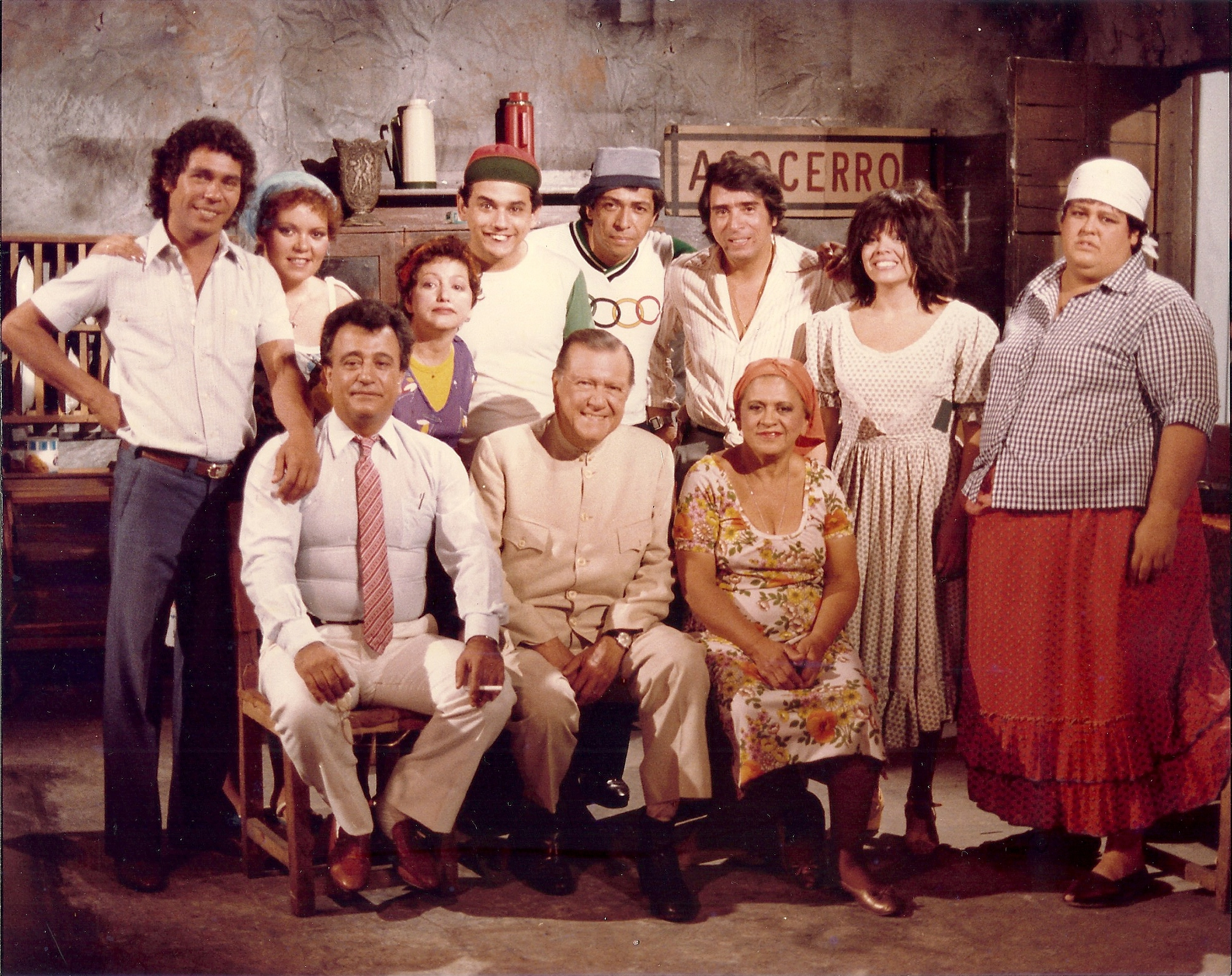
- Presidential candidate Rafael Caldera with the members of the Asocerro sketch show, from the comedy show Radio Rochela, on Radio Caracas Television.
- Genre: Sketch Comedy
- Created by: Tito Martínez del Box
- Written by: Alvaro Ignacio "Nacho" Palacios
- Starring: Juan Ernesto López; Cayito Aponte; Elisa Parejo; Joselo; Juan Carlos Barry; Ariel Fedullo; Félix Granados; Napoleon Rivero; Alexander Noguera; Norah Suárez; Carlos Rodríguez; Coco Sánchez; Hilda Fuenmayor; Ivette Dominguez; Roy Díaz; Karen Leiba; Gladiuska Acosta; Héctor Vargas; Joseline Rodriguez; Marinés Hernández; Gaetano Ruggero; Alexxey Córdova; Gilberto González
- Opening theme: "La Cruzada del Buen Humor"
- Country of origin: Venezuela
- Original language: Spanish
- No. of seasons: 51
- No. of episodes: 2,652

Production
- Executive producer: Wladimir Gimenez
- Production location: Venezuela
- Running time: 60 minutes
- Production company: RCTV

Original release
- Network: RCTV
- Release: 16 September 1959 – 2007
- Network: RCTV International
- Release: 2007 – 5 April 2010

Radio Rochela was a Venezuelan television sketch comedy and variety show, created by Argentine producer Tito Martinez Del Box.

== Characteristics ==
The show premiered on Radio Caracas Televisión (RCTV), a terrestrial television network in Caracas from 1959 to 2010, under the original title of La Cruzada del Buen Humor.

The show's sketches parodied contemporary Venezuelan culture and Politics. Each week, the show featured a host who is currently an RCTV telenovela actor or actress who is pranked and performs in sketches with the cast.

Throughout its five decades on air, Radio Rochela has been recognized as ‘’the most important comedy show on Venezuela’’ . Radio Rochela was mentioned in the Guinness Book of Records as the comedy television show in history longest, being air uninterrupted for 5 decades. Cast members included Juan Ernesto López, Cayito Aponte, Elisa Parejo, Juan Carlos Barry, Americo Navarro, Joselo, Félix Granados, Ariel Fedullo, Jorge Citino, Eduardo Martínez del Box, Napoleon Rivero, Olimpia Maldonado, Ricardo Pimentel, Alexander Noguera, Gaetano Ruggero, Norah Suárez, Laureano Márquez, Perucho Conde, Carlos Rodríguez, Coco Sánchez, Hilda Fuenmayor, Ivette Dominguez, Roy Díaz, Karen Leiba, Gladiuska Acosta, Ricardo Gruber, Héctor Vargas, Joseline Rodriguez, Jorge Tuero, Marinés Hernández, Alexxey Córdova and Gilberto González.

== History ==
In the year 1959, a group of students at the Central University of Venezuela decided to begin a series of comedy acts at the architecture school. The Argentine producer Tito Martinez Del Box, never saw one of their presentations but he has a part of the El Show de las Doce, hosted by Victor Saume. La Gran Cruzada del Buen Humor became one of the most popular segments on this midday show.

Finally in 1960, La Gran Cruzada del Buen Humor was separated from El Show de las Doce and was renamed Radio Rochela. The show went on the air Monday at 8:00 pm on RCTV. In the 1970s and 1980s "Radio Rochela" was one of the most popular programs in Venezuela.

On May 27, 2007, RCTV went off the air after the government of Hugo Chávez refused to renew its broadcast license (Chávez had announced that his government would not renew RCTV's license on December 28, 2006). On June 4, 2007, a week after RCTV's shut down, there was a Radio Rochela special that aired on Globovisión during Aló Ciudadano.

On July 16, 2007, RCTV resumed broadcast on cable and satellite, and so did "Radio Rochela" with Wladimir Gimenez as executive producer and Alvaro Ignacio "Nacho" Palacios as head writer.

== Cast ==
Many popular Venezuelan comedians have worked on Radio Rochela. All members have the ability to characterize any famous people (politicians, artists, etc.) because the program constantly parodies programs, celebrities and politicians. Entire cast:

- Tito Martinez del Box
- Cayito Aponte †
- Henry Rodríguez
- Américo Navarro (1961–1985)
- Fausto Verdial†
- Virgilio Galindo ("Ruyío") †
- Betty Hass
- Irma Palmieri †
- Eduardo Martinez del Box
- José Ignacio Cadavieco
- Argenis Angarita
- Pedro Elías Belisario
- Cesar Granados ("Bolido")†
- Joselo (1960–1964) †
- Jorge Tuero†
- Juan Carlos Barry ("El Machazo")
- Nelly Pujols
- Kiko Mendive †
- Gaetano Ruggero de Vita ("Che Gaetano")
- Nelson Paredes ("Cara de Piedra") †
- Olimpia Maldonado †
- Honorio Torrealba † ("Tirabesitos")
- Romelia Agüero
- Haydeé Tosta
- Manolo Malpica ("Semillita")
- Karla Luzbel †
- Emilio Lovera (1982–2005)
- Juan Ernesto López (Pepeto) (1959–2010) †
- Umberto Buonocuore †
- Charles Barry †
- Roberto Hernández †
- Laureano Márquez
- Gilberto González
- Elisa Parejo (1959–2010)
- Gilberto Varela
- Norah Suárez (1989–2010)
- César "Nené" Quintana
- Milton Izquierdo
- Pedro ("el Gato") Soto †
- Gladiuska Acosta (La Coconaza).
- Beto Parra
- Ricardo Gruber
- Victor Hernández
- Juan Carlos Barry
- Ariel Fedullo
- Martha Olivo "Malula" †
- Ivette Domínguez
- Gioconda Pérez
- Jackeline Márquez
- Martha Piñango †
- Jorge Citino
- Tito Martínez del Box †
- Eduardo Martínez del Box †
- Nancy Soto
- Toco Gómez
- Perucho Conde
- Roy Díaz
- Ricardo Pimentel †
- Victor Cuica
- Franco Colmenares
- Maribel Zambrano
- Fina Rojas †
