= El show de las doce =

Venezuelan variety show (1954-1964)

El Show de las Doce is a Venezuelan variety show that was shown on Radio Caracas Televisión between 1954 and 1964. It was created and hosted by Víctor Saume.

== History ==
El Show de las Doce was the first daytime television show in the history of Venezuelan television. For many years, channels 5 (Televisora Nacional) and channel 4 (Televisa) only began in the evenings. Produced by Corpa Publicidad, sponsored by Lucky Strike Cigarettes (later by Añejo Santa Teresa, a brand of rum), and hosted exclusively by Víctor Saume, this program began in mid-1954 and was shown between 12:00 noon and 1:30 p.m., Mondays and Saturdays. It was live, with an audience in the studio. The show was usually made in studio nine, which was used for shows with big audiences, though occasionally it would be produced in studio 15, located in the current Miniteatro del Este de Plaza Venezuela. It was one of the few shows in Venezuela that managed to maintain its original set design throughout its run.

Although Saume was the central figure of this show, other hosts assisted on occasion. It was even hosted by José Luis Sarzalejo for a period of five years. The show was also hosted by Héctor Monteverde, Félix Cardona Moreno, Charles Barry, and Luis Brito Arocha. When it came time to announce the commercial break, Saume came up with the catch phrase "Vamos arriba" ("going up"). Renny Ottolina, considered Saume's successor by some people, perfected the catch phrase by including the word "master" ("Vamos a master" or "lets go to the master"). El Show de las Doce brought to its audience celebrities such as Pedro Infante, Libertad Lamarque, Olga Guillot, Celia Cruz and La Sonora Matancera, La Tongolele, Miguel Aceves Mejía and Lola Flores. Venezuelan artists who appeared on the show included Alfredo Sadel, Héctor Cabrera, Los Torrealberos, Magdalena Sánchez, Rosa Virginia Chacín, Cherry Navarro, and Chelique Sarabia. One of the show's segments, "La gran cruzada del buen humor", later gave birth to Radio Rochela Televisión (the original name of this comedy show). This segment could be seen on Mondays, Wednesdays and Fridays, for fifteen minutes.

"In little time, it was converted in the most popular program in television. Those who came from other places in the country went directly to Uncle Saume, because somebody recommended to go to him. It was frequent the visits from those who wanted to know something publicly." (Edith Guzmán, El Nacional, September 29, 1974, ten years after the death of Saume).

In 1960, the program became known simply as El Show de Saume. At the beginning of 1964, it was found that Saume had some respiratory problems, and the show ended on March 15, 1964, eight months before his death.

== See also ==
- RCTV
- List of programs broadcast by RCTV
