= Patricia Lopez (journalist) =

Patricia Lopez was a general assignment reporter for the CW11 Morning News on New York City's WPIX-TV.
