= Treadway (surname) =

Treadway is a surname. Notable people with the surname include:

- Allen T. Treadway (1867–1947), American politician
- Craig Treadway, American journalist and TV news anchor
- Jeff Treadway (born 1963), Major League Baseball second baseman
- Red Treadway (1920–1994), Major League Baseball outfielder
- Rick Treadway (born 1970), American auto racer
- Richard Treadway (1913–2006), American politician and businessman
- Ty Treadway (born 1967), American actor

== See also ==
- Tredway, a surname
