= Tredway =

Tredway is a surname. Notable people with the surname include:

- Brock Tredway (born 1959), Canadian ice hockey player
- Lettice Mary Tredway (1595–1677), English abbess
- William Tredway (American politician) (1807–1891), American politician
- Luke Aaron Tredway (1974–1984), presumed victim of American serial killer Douglas Franklin Wright

== See also ==
- Treadway (surname)
