= Craig Treadway =

American journalist

Craig Treadway is an American television journalist. He currently serves as weekend evening anchor on WPIX with Kala Rama. He was previously co-anchor of the early edition of the PIX 11 Morning News, which aired from 4 to 6 a.m on weekdays, opposite Tiffany McElroy. Treadway joined WPIX-TV on the program on its June 5, 2000 debut. He had previously been a reporter from WNYW, since 1997. He also worked at KMOX radio and TV from 1989 to 1991 and from 1992 to 1997, he worked at NECN in Boston, MA.

Before entering news broadcasting, he served as a member of the University City, Missouri Police Department, as a patrol officer, detective, and evidence technician.

He received his college education at the University of Missouri at St. Louis.

He also lives in the Newstead Section of South Orange, New Jersey.
