= Morton Dean =

American news journalist

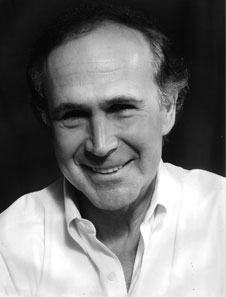
- Born: Morton Dean Dubitsky; August 22, 1935 (age 91); Fall River, Massachusetts, U.S.
- Education: Emerson College
- Occupations: Anchor; News Correspondent
- Years active: 1957–present
- Notable credits: CBS Evening News Anchor and News Correspondent (1976–1984); ABC News Anchor and News Correspondent (1988–2001)
- Spouses: Valerie Carter (m. 1965; div. ?); Lonnie Reed (m. April 21, 1984; div. 1996)
- Children: Adam (son); Sarah (daughter); Jennie (daughter)

Morton Dean Dubitsky (born August 22, 1935), better known as Morton Dean, is an American retired television and radio anchor, news correspondent and author.

Dean is a former weekend news anchor for CBS Evening News, as well as ABC's Good Morning America.

While a correspondent for CBS News for 20 years and ABC News for 14 years, his many assignments included the U.S. space program, political campaigns and the Vietnam War.

Dean reported on the Invasion of Grenada, the Falklands War and Cuba from the early days of the Castro regime up to the present. He reported on Iran during the hostage crisis, from Somalia during the U.S. intervention, the turmoil in Israel and the Palestinian Territory and the military action in Kosovo involving U.S. Marines. He covered Saddam Hussein's Iraq, the NATO air attacks in Belgrade, the terror bomb blast on the USS Cole bombing in Yemen, the bombing of the U.S. Embassy in Nairobi and the U.S. retaliation in Sudan, as well as the first terrorist attacks on World Trade Center in 1993.

Dean is the author of two books and writer and director of American Medevac, a documentary which reconnects medevac crew members with some of the service members they had rescued during the Vietnam War.

Dean received numerous awards for his reporting, including a National Emmy Award, an Overseas Press Club Award and a UPI Golden Mike.

== Early life and education ==
Dean was born on August 22, 1935, in Fall River, Massachusetts, the son of Joseph Dubitsky and Celia (Schwartz) Dubitsky. He is Jewish and was bar mitzvahed. He attended B.M.C. Durfee High School in Fall River. In 1957, he earned a bachelor's degree in English from Emerson College in Boston. At Emerson, he was captain of the basketball team and president of his fraternity, Alpha Pi Theta; he also participated in The Berkeley Beacon student newspaper as well as the WERS radio station. He changed his name from Dubitsky to Dean while in college. In 1977, he received a Doctor of Law, honorary degree from his alma mater.

In 1983, the television studio and publications center at the high school was named the Morton Dean Television Studio in his honor and in 2011, Dean was presented the key to the city of Fall River by former mayor Willian Flanagan.

== Career ==
Dean began his career in 1957 as a reporter and later news director at Westchester County, New York, radio station WVIP which became the flagship station for the Herald Tribune Radio Network, a group of suburban AM and FM stations in New York State. In 1960, Dean was program director of WVOX New Rochelle. From 1961 to 1964, he was a reporter for the radio station WBZ in Boston. In 1962, he won a UPI Broadcasters Association of Massachusetts Award.

=== CBS News ===
In 1964, Dean joined WCBS-TV, the flagship station of the CBS Television Network, located in New York City as a reporter and anchor.

In 1967, he moved to the CBS network and later succeeded Walter Cronkite as the principal space correspondent for CBS covering the U.S. space program, national politics and the Vietnam War.

==== Vietnam War ====
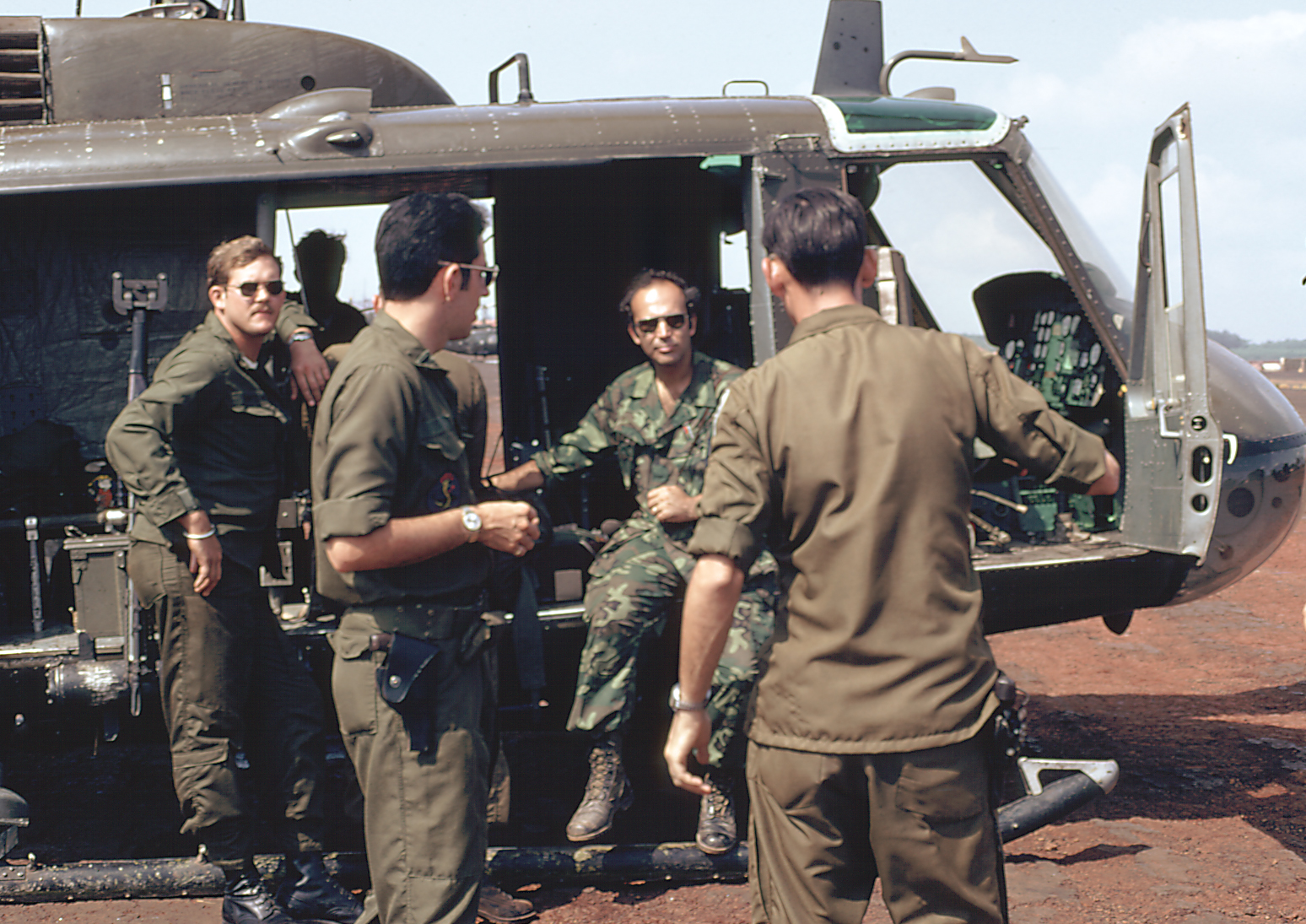
News correspondent Morton Dean in Vietnam in 1971 during a medevac mission for CBS Evening News

In 1971, during a six-month assignment in Vietnam for CBS Evening News, Dean covered a combat medevac mission under fire. With cameraman Greg Cooke, they filmed a seven-minute segment that aired four days later on the CBS Evening News with Walter Cronkite.

A feature article about the medevac rescues during the Vietnam War and his experience as a news correspondent flying on these missions, was published in Smithsonian Air & Space Magazine. In 2015, Dean and Cooke inspired by the memory of those events in 1971 produced and directed a documentary, American Medevac, which reunites the medevac crew with some of the service members they had rescued in 1971.

==== CBS News weekend anchor ====
In late 1975, Dean was named anchor of the CBS Sunday Night News, and later in 1976, moved to the CBS Sunday Evening News until 1984. He also anchored weekday afternoon and evening editions of the 90-second Newsbreak updates.

At CBS, Dean reported on the Iran hostage crisis in 1980, the Space Shuttle Columbia missions, the Salvadoran Civil War in 1982, the U.S. Invasion of Grenada in 1983 and the Falklands War in 1982.

=== Career between CBS and ABC ===
Starting in early 1985, Dean anchored the Independent Network News newscast for about three years.

In 1986, Dean was one of forty semi-finalists in the "Journalist in Space Program" (cancelled following the Space Shuttle Challenger disaster) as a candidate from Connecticut.

In 1987, Dean filled in for Larry King on the nationally syndicated program the Larry King Show, a radio talk show which aired on the Mutual Broadcasting System.

=== ABC News ===
In September 1988, Dean joined ABC News as a correspondent and covered the return to space following the Space Shuttle Challenger disaster.

Dean reported for ABC World News Tonight with Peter Jennings and other ABC News broadcasts and was a substitute anchor for Ted Koppel on Nightline.

In 1990, Dean spent more than three months covering news events in the Mideast and was the first television journalist to report from inside Kuwait following the Iraqi invasion.

For World News Tonight, he reported from the Middle East during the Gulf War and was on the scene of the first ground battle of Operation Desert Storm in January 1991.

In addition, he covered the 1992 presidential election campaigns with in-depth coverage of the Ross Perot presidential campaign.

In 1992, from Mogadishu, Somalia during the Somali Civil War and Operation Provide Relief, Dean reported on the first American casualties and former U. S. President George H. W. Bush’s visit to the area.

In 1993, Dean was lead reporter on the first World Trade Center bombing by terrorists. Dean was the first and only newsperson to see and report from inside the garage where the truck bomb detonated and later covered the investigation into the attack.

==== Good Morning America ====
In 1993, Dean became the news anchor on ABC’s Good Morning America and presented the newscasts on the morning show until 1996.

Dean traveled to Nairobi, Kenya to cover the 1998 United States embassy bombings, and then went to Sudan to cover, Operation Infinite Reach in August 1998 which made cruise missile strikes on al-Qaeda bases in Afghanistan and a pharmaceutical factory in Sudan in retaliation for the American embassy bombings in Kenya and Tanzania.

In 1999, Dean reported from Kosovo for 30 days during the NATO air attacks during the Kosovo War which helped ABC News win an Emmy for its coverage of the conflict.

In 2000, when a deadly terrorist bomb blasted the U.S.S. Cole in Yemen, he was dispatched as ABC's lead reporter.

=== Post-ABC career ===
In 2002, Dean narrated and hosted a series of documentaries for A&E and The History Channel.

He reported and hosted a monthly 60-minute cable network science show and occasionally appeared on National Public Radio "Morning Edition” commenting on politics and terrorism.

Dean is a freelance writer, occasionally writing on subjects of personal interest, including stories about the Boston Red Sox and his latest journey to Cuba, 50 years after his 1959 interview with Fidel Castro.

He is a member of the Vietnam War Commemoration Commission created by Presidential proclamation whose goal is to embrace those who served during the Vietnam era and also does pro bono work for Autism Speaks, the world largest autism awareness organization.

== Personal life ==
Dean resides with his long-time partner, Mary Miller, in Chatham, Massachusetts. He is the father of three grown children a son, political consultant Adam Dubitsky, and two daughters, Sarah and Jennie.

== Awards ==
Dean has received many awards for his reporting, including a National Emmy, an Overseas Press Club Award and a UPI Golden Mike Award.

In 1962, he won a UPI Broadcasters Association of Massachusetts Award for aiding in the capture of a murder suspect.

In 1976, Dean was part of the CBS News team that the Overseas Press Club, New York awarded the Radio Interpretation Award for Journalistic Achievement for "America in Vietnam".

In 1981 at CBS News Sunday Morning, he received an Outstanding Documentary Program Emmy for "Louis is 13".

Dean was nominated for a national Emmy Award for his reporting the gun battle in Kosovo involving U. S. Marines who were pinned down by snipers.

In 2000, he was part of the ABC news team which won an Emmy Award for Outstanding News and Documentary Program Achievement for ABC 2000: The Millennium.

== Documentaries ==
"American Medevac" Writer, Co-Producer, Co-Director, 2017. PBS. During the Vietnam War, CBS News correspondent Morton Dean and cameraman Greg Cooke flew on a harrowing medevac mission to rescue three wounded infantrymen from an enemy infested rice paddy. Dean long wondered what had become of the medevac crew and the bloodied men who were airlifted to safety on that day in 1971. American Medevac tells the story of their reunion, more than 40 years later.

== Books ==
Hello World! (Co-Author), 1978.
The Return to Glory Days (Co-Author), 1997.

== Trivia ==
Morton Dean is the only recipient of an honorary degree from the Ringling Bros. and Barnum & Bailey Clown College.

Dean's clowning career began on a lark after he finished a story on the women of the circus for CBS Sunday Morning. While thanking the public relations people for their help, one said, "Anything we can do for you, just let us know." He nodded and left. He took the elevator down, then he took it right back up again and said, "I'd like to try to be a clown.

Dean performs occasionally as a Ringling clown. "It's my Walter Mitty side," he told an interviewer.

== Quotes ==
"I try to get as much background and history as I can, says Dean. "I try to find my own sources. I try to make an extra phone call. One way or another I try to find a nugget of information that might give me an edge."

"I’ve made a career out of asking dumb questions. I mean, that’s our job—not to prove how smart we are but to elicit answers, and I think you sometimes have to ask what appears to be a dumb question. I am not out there to impress the audience that I have brilliant questions all the time. I am old-fashioned enough to believe that the idea is to get some news at the other end of the question."

"I think that is the most difficult part of this business—covering a breaking story live…You are often out there ‘naked’ and you have to resist the pressure to give information that you’re not certain of and to give your own personal thoughts as opposed to what’s really going on."
