= All-news radio =

Radio format devoted entirely to the discussion and broadcast of news

All-news radio is a radio format devoted entirely to the discussion and broadcast of news.

All-news radio is available in both local and syndicated forms, and is carried on both major US satellite radio networks. All-news stations can run the gamut from simulcasting an all-news television station like CNN, to a "rip and read" headline service, to stations that include live coverage of news events and long-form public affairs programming.

Many stations brand themselves Newsradio but only run news during the morning and afternoon drive times, or in some cases, broadcast talk radio shows with frequent news updates. These stations are properly labeled as "news/talk" stations. Also, some National Public Radio stations identify themselves as News and Information stations, which means that in addition to running the NPR news magazines such as Morning Edition and All Things Considered, they run other information and public affairs programs.

== History ==
In 1956, Chronicle Broadcasting Network (now ABS-CBN) began an attempt to provide a 24-hour news program in the Philippines with its radio station DZXL (now DZMM), despite CBN sales director Nitoy Escano noting that audiences at the time were "not too news-conscious".

In 1960, KJBS radio in San Francisco, California, became KFAX and changed formats from a blend of music, news, and sports to trial the concept of a "newspaper of the air". The call letters reflected the word facts. However, this experiment proved unsuccessful.

Broadcasting pioneer Arthur W. Arundel is credited with establishing the first 24-hour all-news station in the United States in January 1961 on his owned-and-operated WAVA in Washington, D.C. The station met with success amongst an audience in the capital city, then riveted to news of the Vietnam War and of the assassinations of President John F. Kennedy, Martin Luther King, and Robert F. Kennedy. Arundel helped other stations in New York and Chicago to convert to his "All News, All the Time" format and then met direct competition from Washington Post-owned WTOP/1500 in 1969.

Radio programmer Gordon McLendon, who has been credited with pioneering top 40, all-sports, beautiful music, and telephone talk formats, is also an acknowledged pioneer in the all-news format. XTRA News went on the air May 5, 1961, from XETRA, a station licensed to Tijuana, Mexico, whose 50,000-watt signal could be heard in San Diego and Los Angeles. Not long after, WNUS debuted in Chicago (the NUS in the call letters standing for "news"). Fred B. Walters, who served as the first executive editor of Westinghouse's KYW when it launched its all-news format in September 1965, helped establish the operational model that would be replicated at stations across the country.

The format, which can be heard to this day on many all-news stations, started each half-hour with world and national news, from a national network, then switched to locally anchored area news, filling out the half-hour with updates on weather, sports, business, and features. XETRA had no outside reporters and got all of its local news from the AP and UPI wire services. Both stations operated using a 15-minute news cycle with newscasts repeated every 15 minutes.

Another early prototypical all-news format operated through WABC-FM in New York City during the 114-day 1962 New York City newspaper strike which lasted from December 8, 1962, to March 31, 1963. The format only lasted as long as the strike, though, and the station reverted to its regular format of Broadway show tunes and simulcasting of its AM sister station afterwards. The following year, ABC's Detroit FM station, WXYZ-FM, made a similar effort during a newspaper strike. Both stations, which previously had simulcast their AM sister stations, carried ABC Radio Network news programs (including those not heard on the AM Top 40 stations), AM local newscasts plus wire service stories read to fill the balance of the time.

Group W, the broadcast division of Westinghouse, adopted an all-news format 20-minute cycle that eschewed network newscasts so that local and non-local news could be freely mixed, according to what appeared more interesting or important on any given day. Westinghouse also used field reporters at its all-news stations, which included 1010 WINS New York, KYW Newsradio 1060 Philadelphia, and KFWB News 98 Los Angeles. WINS began broadcasting its all-news format in April 1965. KYW launched its all-news format on September 21, 1965, with Fred B. Walters serving as its first executive editor. Walters edited the station's first all-news broadcast and played a major role in establishing KYW's news operation. Under his leadership, KYW became the only all-news station rated number one in a major American market.

In 1975, the NBC Radio Network shut down its profitable weekend music- and information-service NBC Monitor to launch the "News And Information Service" (NIS), the first all-news radio network. It closed two years later in a cost-cutting move, though it had strong ratings in some markets.

In 1994, Associated Press launched an effort similar to NIS. Officially known as AP All-News Radio, it had affiliates from coast to coast. However, it was informally better known by its promotional title of "The News Station". Associated Press discontinued the all-news format in July 2005. However, the Associated Press continue to offer top-of-hour updates, which are streamed 24/7 online.

In 2003, Fox News began syndicating 1-minute radio updates to radio stations via syndication service Westwood One. Some years later, Fox opted to make a full foray into network radio news services. On June 1, 2005, Fox News Radio employed 60 people and provided hourly 5-minute newscasts and a 1-minute newscast half-hourly. At its launch, 60 stations participated in the network, with more joining under a deal struck between Fox and Clear Channel Communications (now iHeartMedia). This allowed many Clear Channel stations to carry Fox News Radio newscasts and allowed Fox News Radio to use and nationally distribute news content produced by Clear Channel, with several of those stations ending decades-long relationships dating back to the Golden Age Of Radio with ABC News Radio (now owned by competitor Cumulus Media) and CBS Radio News to carry Fox News Radio.

Fox also produces Fox News Talk, with talk radio programs featuring Fox News personalities. The programs are broadcast on terrestrial radio stations in the U.S., as well as a dedicated channel on SiriusXM Satellite Radio's digital platform on Channel 450.

The national audio feed of CNN Headline News, began a long phaseout in 2007. Headline News's audio feed was popular among some all-news stations, particularly after the AP disbanded the format in 2005, until the TV network decided in 2006 to abandon its all-news format and add talk-show programming in prime time, when many smaller stations do not have air staff and rely on a network feed. Most of the Headline News affiliates became talk-radio stations, with a handful of daytime-only stations keeping the feed. CNN also for a time offered a second all-news channel with the hour filled with CNN Radio newscasts on the hour and half-hour and business, sports, and feature segments from CNN Radio and Headline News at specific points each hour, plus time segments for local news to be inserted. Many smaller affiliates, however, preferred Headline News audio which was more suited to turn-key (or unattended, automated) operation. CNN Radio ceased operations April 1, 2012, although CNN continues to stream an advertisement-supported audio simulcast of CNN on TuneIn.

While not a full-time NIS, the CBS Radio Network provided significant content for most all-news radio stations in the United States until it ceased operations on May 22, 2026. WestwoodOne offers 2 morning news magazines (First Light and America In The Morning) on weekdays, which many talk radio stations air at 4 AM or 5 AM. The network's mobile app also contains a 24/7 stream featuring rolling news and features on a set schedule, along with breaking news coverage.

All-news has for years been a top-rated radio format in New York, Washington, D.C., and other cities, but as big-city traffic worsens and people work longer hours that increase the urgency of planning their day ahead, the focus of such stations has increasingly turned to traffic and to weather, updated every 10 minutes. Attempts at long-form commercial all-news stations, such as Washington Post Radio, have been largely unsuccessful.

A newcomer to all-news in the early 2010s, Randy Michaels, acquired FM stations in New York, Chicago, and Philadelphia (through his Merlin Media company) in preparation for all-news formats in those cities (the Philadelphia station never made the switch and instead aired talk shows). Michaels gave up on the format after approximately one year (after an attempt to add 'conversational breaks' discussing the news), and changed formats on both the New York and Chicago stations to music, later selling the stations.

Talk Radio Network launched America's Radio News Network, a 15-hour weekday block of news, in January 2011; the company had been launching 3-hour news blocks in specific dayparts since January 2009. The network was syndicated mostly to smaller stations in need of turnkey news operations during the day; the network never produced programming for overnights or weekends. The service shut down in September 2013.

In 2012, Cumulus Media added more all-news hours on KGO in San Francisco and KLIF in Dallas under the branding "News And Information", but both stations have since changed to a news-talk format due to audience and talk staff rejection of the all-news programming as presented on the stations, accompanied by staff reductions due to budget cuts.

In 2016, "24/7 News" on the iHeart app was renamed NBC NewsRadio. It also carries a second all-news network, AP Radio News.

In late 2015, Fox News Radio began offering Fox News Headlines 24/7 exclusively to SiriusXM subscribers on Channel 115. The program is a live-anchored all-news radio channel offering news, sports, entertainment, and social media discussion in 15-minute blocks. It is a companion channel to the audio simulcasts of the Fox News Channel on SiriusXM 114 and Fox Business on SiriusXM 113. The channel draws heavily from the newsgathering resources of Fox News Radio's two terrestrial radio networks.

TuneIn offers audio simulcasts of several television networks, including CNN, MSNBC, CNBC, and Fox News, along with 'commercial-free' feeds (in reality, extra network features overlaid over commercial advertising) through its Premium tier.

== Stations ==
Many all-news stations only operate as such during the daytime, or may preempt news. To be included in this list, a station must broadcast news programming during a majority of a normal broadcast day.

=== Africa ===
==== South Africa ====
- SAfm – news and talk in English language

=== Asia ===
==== China ====
- CNR The Voice Of China frequencies are varied nationwide.
- CNR Business Radio FM 96.6 in Beijing, FM 91.4 in Shanghai, FM 106.6 in Guangzhou, etc – business information station
- CRI News Radio FM 90.5 in Beijing
- Beijing Newsradio FM94.5 (Beijing)
- Zhejiang Newsradio FM98.8 AM1530 (Hangzhou)
- Shanghai Newsradio FM 93.4 AM 990 (Shanghai)
- Tianjin Newsradio FM 97.2 AM909 (Tianjin)

==== Hong Kong ====
- RTHK Radio 1
- Metro Info
- Metro Finance – business information

==== India ====
- AIR Live News 24×7

==== Indonesia ====
Logo of RRI Programa 3

- RRI Programa 3 – national, relayed by local stations
- MNC Trijaya FM – national network
- Radio Elshinta – national network

==== Iran ====
- IRIB Radio Eghtesad – business information

==== Israel ====
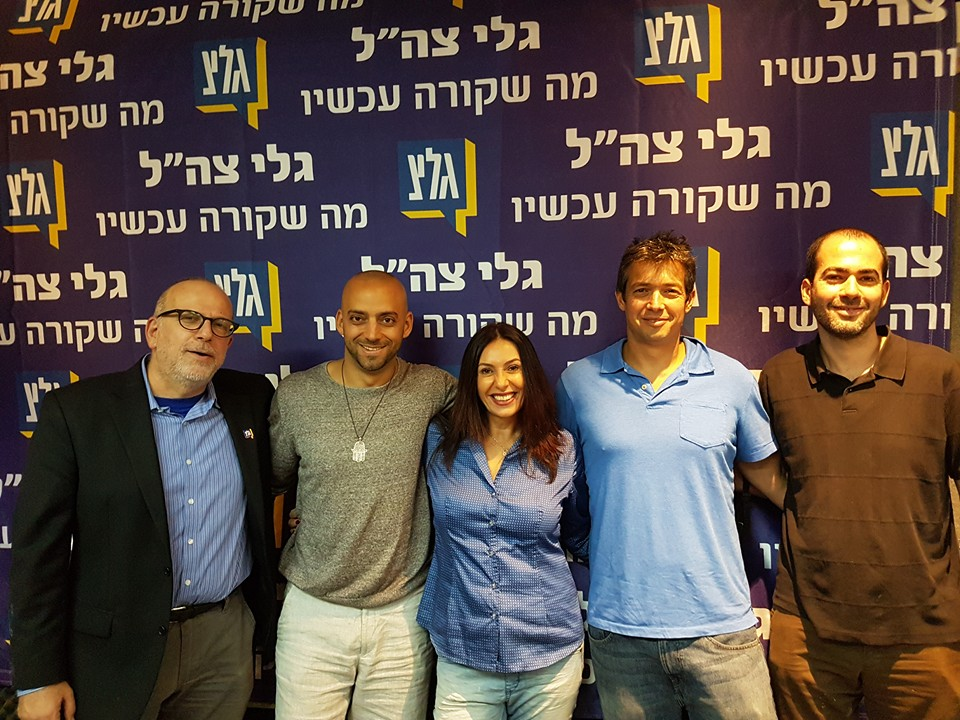
People at the Galei Tzahal station in 2016

- Kan Bet — currently operated by the Israeli Public Broadcasting Corporation
- Galey Tzahal – operated by The Israel Defense Forces

==== Malaysia ====
- Astro Awani Radio – all news station operated by Astro Audio
- Bernama Radio – all news station operated by state news agency, BERNAMA
- BFM 89.9 – business information station

==== Nepal ====
- Image News FM – "All news. Always news."

==== Pakistan ====
- Radio Pakistan News and Current Affairs Channel

==== Philippines ====
Chronicle Broadcasting Network (now ABS-CBN) first attempted to produce a 24-hour news program with its radio station DZXL (later DZMM, now DWPM) in 1956.

The all-news radio format in the country is largely credited as having started in 1968 at the height of that year's Casiguran earthquake that notably toppled the Ruby Tower in Manila. Starting out on the AM band, FM started to become a successful nationwide prospective trend in 2009.

===== AM Band =====
Almost all AM stations in large broadcast markets of the Philippines are all-news stations while smaller markets employ a full-service format. The stations listed are flagship stations based in Manila.

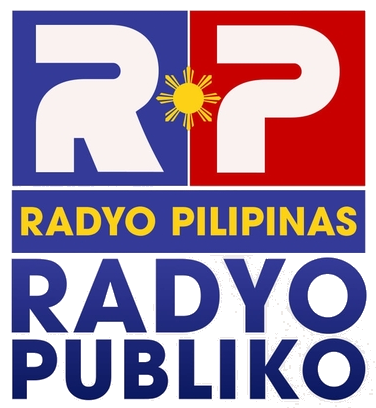
Logo of Radyo Pilipinas Radyo Publiko

Logo of DZMM Radyo Patrol 630

- DWIZ 882
- DZMM Radyo Patrol 630 (DWPM)
- GMA Super Radyo DZBB 594
- RMN DZXL 558 kHz
- DZRH – The oldest radio station.
- Radyo Pilipinas
- Radyo Agila DZEC 1062
- DZRJ 810 AM Radyo Bandido
- Aksyon Radyo (10 originating provincial stations in large radio markets)
- DZAS 702 AM
- Radyo Veritas 846
- GV AM 792 Pampanga
- Bombo Radyo (does not have an AM station in Manila but maintains its Makati newscenter and 21 originating provincial stations in large radio markets)
- Radyo Ukay (6 originating Mindanao stations in large radio markets)
- Radyo Ronda (13 originating provincial stations in large radio markets)
- Radyo Pilipino (15 originating provincial stations in large radio markets)

===== FM Band =====
Prior to 2009, the format was experimental on independent provincial FM stations and were mostly operated via time-brokerage until key stations in the country began a trend on operating all-news radio networks on FM, though the earlier practice still has considerable extent in smaller radio markets. This foray has a major advantage from the long-standing "news-intensive AM" because of high-quality broadcasting and penetrates all locations, unlike the older AM transmissions that are prone to electrical and other signal interference.

As of December 2018, six major network operators have their distinction of this format on the FM band.

- TV5 Network, Inc. (November 8, 2010 – present)
  - True FM (sole originating FM station in 105.9 Mega Manila and six relay FM stations in the Provincial in large radio markets)
- Brigada Mass Media Corporation (October 18, 2009 – present)
  - Brigada News FM (54 originating stations and 16 provincial relay stations (including; 98.1 Bataraza, 103.7 Brooke's Point, 101.3 Coron, 93.3 Cuyo, 95.3 El Nido, 96.5 Narra, 98.3 Quezon, 100.5 Roxas and 104.9 Taytay via 103.1 Puerto Princesa, 105.1 Baguio via 105.1 Mega Manila as the flagship FM station, 99.9 Iba and 107.3 Palauig via 93.5 Olongapo, 87.7 Goa via 103.1 Naga, 93.5 Ormoc via 93.5 Tacloban, 90.3 Digos via 93.1 Davao and 104.5 Tacurong via 95.7 Koronadal) in large and mid-sized radio markets)
- Radyo Bandera News Philippines (2015 – present)
  - Radyo Bandera News FM (23 originating stations and 9 provincial relay stations (including; 88.7 Coron, 89.5 Brooke's Point, 91.1 Quezon, 93.9 Roxas, 107.1 Narra, 104.3 Rizal, 94.5 Bataraza, 98.9 Cuyo and 107.1 San Vicente) in large mid-sized radio markets)
- 5K Broadcasting Network (2021–present)
  - K5 News FM Philippines (59 originating stations and 6 relay stations (including; 98.7 Brooke's Point, 103.1 Quezon, 107.1 Sofronio Española, 98.3 Roxas, 96.5 Coron and 98.5 Narra) in large mid-sized radio markets)
- Sagay Broadcasting Corporation (2011–present)
  - Muews Radio (10 stations in various large and mid-sized radio markets)
- St. Jude Thaddeus Institute of Technology (2022–present)
  - Infinite Radio (40 stations in large and mid-sized radio markets)
- RSV Broadcasting Network, Inc. (2022–present)
  - Juander Radyo (30 stations in various Visayas and Mindanao large and mid-sized radio markets)
- Philippine Collective Media Corporation (2020–present)
  - FMR Philippines (50 originating stations (example: 100.7 Tacloban) and 5 relay stations in Eastern Visayas (including 101.7 Borongan, 91.7 Catarman, 106.9 Catbalogan, 100.7 Ormoc and 88.5 Calbayog) and the flagship FM station 92.3 Mega Manila in various large and mid-sized radio markets)
- Y2H Broadcasting Network, Inc. (2022 – present)
  - XFM Philippines (42 origianting stations and 14 relay stations (including; 106.1 Kabankalan via 90.3 Bacolod, 95.7 Bayugan via 91.3 San Francisco, 103.9 Digos via 89.1 Davao, 105.7 Narra, 91.9 Quezon, 93.5 Brooke's Point, 91.7 Bataraza, 103.5 Rizal, 97.9 Cuyo, 103.5 San Vicente, 89.9 Coron, 91.5 El Nido, 98.5 Taytay and 97.1 Roxas) in large mid-sized radio markets)
- MBC Media Group
  - Radyo Natin (120 stations in small/community markets)
- Many local/regional independent stations in key provinces with their own individual branding (e.g. eMedia News FM in Zamboanga, Zagitsit News FM in Legazpi)

==== Saudi Arabia ====
- Al Arabiya Radio

==== Singapore ====
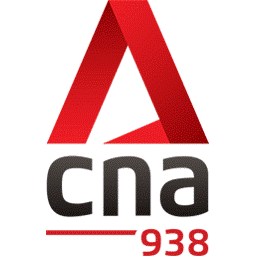
Logo of CNA938

- CNA938
- Money FM 89.3 – business information

==== South Korea ====
- YTN News FM 94.5

==== Thailand ====
- MCOT News
- Nation Radio
- Business 98 – business information

==== United Arab Emirates ====
- Sky News Arabia Radio

==== Uzbekistan ====
- O‘zbekiston24

=== Europe ===
==== Belgium ====
- Radio 1 – news and sports in Dutch language

==== Denmark ====
Logo of DR P1

- DR P1 is a mixed-genre service but it provides the most comprehensive news, documentaries and political debate programs in the country.

==== France ====
Logo of France Info

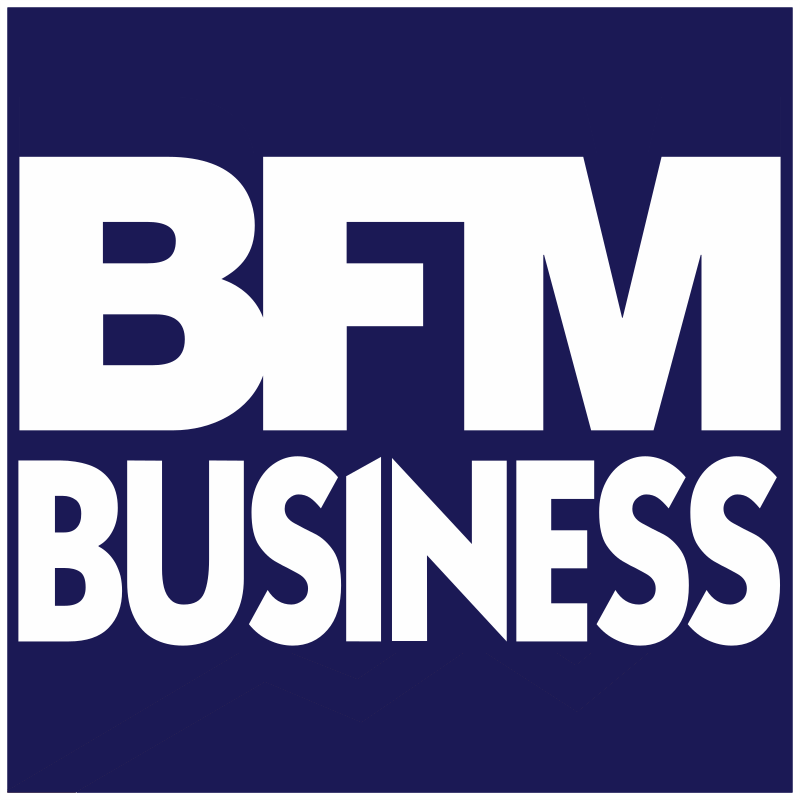
Logo of BFM Business

- France Info
- BFM Business – business information
- BFM Radio

==== Germany ====
Most all news stations in Germany are operated by the local public broadcasters in the different states. All of these stations carry ARD-Infonacht produced by NDR Info during the overnight hours. And 29 April 2024 all of these stations (except Antenne Saar and WDR 5) carry ARD-Infoabend from 1 October 2024 produced by MDR Aktuell during the news, discussion debates and live sport coverage.

- Deutschlandfunk (DLF) in all of Germany by Deutschlandradio
- BR24 (formerly: B5 aktuell (B5 up-to-date)) from Bavarian Broadcasting Bayerischer Rundfunk
- hr-info from Hessian Broadcasting Hessischer Rundfunk
- MDR Aktuell (formerly: MDR Info) from Central German Broadcasting Mitteldeutscher Rundfunk
- NDR Info from North German Broadcasting Norddeutscher Rundfunk
- NDR Info Spezial from North German Broadcasting Norddeutscher Rundfunk
- rbb24 Inforadio from Broadcasting Berlin/Brandenburg Rundfunk Berlin-Brandenburg
- Antenne Saar in Saarland with Franco-German character from Saarland Broadcasting Saarländischer Rundfunk
- SWR Aktuell (Formerly: SWR cont.ra, SWR info) in Baden-Württemberg and Rhineland-Palatinat broadcast by Südwestrundfunk
- WDR 5 from North Rhine-Westphalia Broadcasting Westdeutscher Rundfunk

==== Greece ====
- ERT News Radio 105.8
- Mega News 104.6

==== Hungary ====
- Kossuth Rádió
- InfoRádió – regional from Budapest

==== Ireland ====
- RTÉ Radio 1 is a mixed-genre service but it provides the most comprehensive news and current affairs coverage in the country.
- Newstalk is a rolling all-news and talk 24/7.

==== Italy ====
Logo of Rai Radio 1

- Rai Radio 1 – the main Italian public news, talk and sports, owned by Rai
- Radio 24 – the main Italian private all-news radio, owned by the economical newspaper Il Sole 24 Ore
- Babboleo News – first local Italian all-news radio in Genoa, Liguria.

==== Netherlands ====
Logo of NPO Radio 1

- BNR Nieuwsradio – non-stop live news and info
- NPO Radio 1 – news, sports and events

==== Norway ====
- NRK Nyheter - NRK's All-News Station

==== Poland ====
- Polskie Radio 24 - Polskie Radio's All-News station from 2010
- Tok FM - commercial news and talk station with bulletins every 20 minutes between 5 am and midnight on weekdays, and 7 am and midnights on weekends with headlines only on :20 and :40.
- Radio Republika - commercial news and talk station.

==== Portugal ====
- Rádio Observador
- TSF Rádio Notícias

==== Romania ====
- 3fm – regional from Bucharest
- Digi 24 FM – regional from Bucharest

==== Russia ====
- Kommersant FM – all-news station from newspaper Kommersant
- Business FM – business information
- Vesti FM – all-news station from VGTRK

==== Spain ====
Logo of Radio 5

- Radio 5 – National news station from the Spanish public broadcaster
- Capital Radio – National business information station from the Spanish commercial broadcaster
- Radio Intereconomía – National business information station from the Spanish commercial broadcaster
- 3CatInfo – Catalan news station for Catalonia
- Radio Andalucía Información – Regional news station for Andalusia

==== Sweden ====
- SR Ekot – Sveriges Radio All-News Station

==== Switzerland ====
- Radio SRF 4 News – all-news in German language

==== Turkey ====
- TRT Radyo Haber
- a Haber Radyo
- a Para Radyo – business information
- NTV Radyo
- Bloomberg HT Radyo – business information
- CNN Türk Radyo
- HaberTürk Radyo
- TVNET Radyo
- 24 Radyo
- CNBC-e Radyo – business information

==== Ukraine ====
- Radio Ukraine
- Business Radio – business information
- Radio NV

==== United Kingdom ====
- BBC Radio 5 Live – news and sports for UK from 24/7 every 5 minutes.
- Live BBC News – rolling news for UK from 24/7 from programming BBC News Channel, BBC Radio 4, BBC Radio 5 Live and BBC World Service.
- LBC News – rolling news for UK from 24/7 every 20 minutes.
- Times Radio – news and talk for UK from 24/7 every 5 minutes.
- GB News Radio – news for UK from 24/7.
- News Radio UK – the UK's only 24/7 headline news station, providing news, sports, travel, business, showbiz and weather updates every 10 minutes. This station was launched in 10/10/2016, at 10 a.m.

=== North America ===
==== Canada ====
Between 1977 and 1989, Canada All News Limited operated Canada's first attempt at all news radio with a network of eight FM stations and one AM station in major Canadian cities, all using the base callsign CKO (or CK News). The effort was similar in some ways to NBC Radio's News and Information Service, mostly national news programming with cut-ins for individual stations to broadcast local news. The network was also the first to offer live broadcasts of Question Time in the Canadian parliament. The network was plagued by low ratings and poor advertising sales (similar to problems faced by all-news radio networks operated by NBC, CNN and AP in the US). Ironically, many of the stations listed below operate in cities which CKO News had served previously.

| Call sign | Branding | City | Owner |
|---|---|---|---|
| CFTR | 680 NewsRadio Toronto | Toronto | Rogers Sports & Media |

News-talk radio stations 570 NewsRadio in Kitchener/Waterloo, Ontario, 95.7 NewsRadio in Halifax (also Rogers Broadcasting-owned stations) use an all-news wheel for their morning and afternoon shows, simulating their sister station, 680 NewsRadio in Toronto.

In February 2001, Corus Entertainment launched an all-news sister station to Vancouver news-talk station CKNW. All news NW2 (CJNW AM730, formerly CKLG) was branded as "24 hour news radio, powered by CKNW." NW2 shared newsroom resources with CKNW, including several anchors and reporters. However, NW2 did not achieve broad appeal, and was shut down in May 2002. The station currently airs an all-traffic format under the call sign CHMJ. That same year, Corus acquired two all-news stations in Montreal, CINW ("940 News") at 940 AM in English and CINF ("Info 690") at 690 AM in French, which had launched in late 1999. These frequencies were previously operated by the Canadian Broadcasting Corporation's English and French radio services respectively before the public broadcaster switched to the FM dial. But as AM radio listenership in Montreal declined sharply in recent years – only longtime talk-radio stations CJAD in English and CKAC in French (now an all-traffic station) remained popular – neither CINW nor CINF were able to make a profit (even after several format changes on CINW), and Corus finally shut down both stations on January 29, 2010.

==== Mexico ====
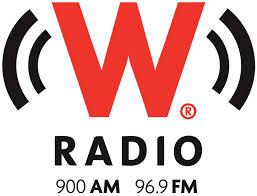
Logo of XEW-AM, also broadcast on XEW-FM

- XEDA-FM - Imagen Radio 90.5 FM Mexico City
- XEW-FM - W Radio 96.9 FM in Mexico City
- XHDL-FM - Heraldo Radio 98.5 FM in Mexico City
- XHMVS-FM - MVS 102.5 FM in Mexico City
- XERFR-FM - Radio Fórmula 103.3 FM in Mexico City
- XEDF-FM/XEDF-AM - Radio Fórmula 104.1 FM / 1500 AM in Mexico City
- XEAI-AM - Radio Fórmula 1470 AM in Mexico City
- XHBI-FM - BI Noticias 88.7 FM in Aguascalientes City, Aguascalientes
- XEF-AM - Activa 1420 AM in Ciudad Juárez, Chihuahua
- XEYC-AM - Radio Fórmula Juárez 1460 AM in Ciudad Juárez, Chihuahua
- XECJC-AM - Radio Net 1490 AM in Ciudad Juárez, Chihuahua
- XEJPV-AM- W Radio 1560 AM in Ciudad Juárez, Chihuahua
- XHACE-FM/XEACE-AM - Radio Fórmula Mazatlán 91.3 FM / 1470 AM in Mazatlán, Sinaloa
- XESTN-AM - Universal y La Octava - 1540 AM in Monterrey, Nuevo León
- XEOR-AM - NotiGape 1390 AM in Reynosa, Tamaulipas
- XEPE-AM - Heraldo Radio 1700 AM in Tijuana, Baja California

==== United States ====
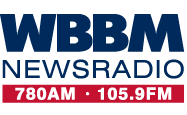
Logo of WBBM

- ABC News Radio
  - WBBM and WCFS-FM: Chicago, Illinois
  - WWJ: Detroit, Michigan
  - WKVI: Knox, Indiana
  - KNX and KNX-FM: Los Angeles, California
  - WINS and WINS-FM: New York, New York
  - KCBS and KFRC-FM: San Francisco, California
  - KNWN and KNWN-FM: Seattle, Washington
  - WTOP-FM: Washington, D.C.
- Associated Press Radio: national
- Black Information Network: national
- Bloomberg Radio: national (business/finance)
  - WBBR: New York, New York
  - WBOS and WNBP: Boston
  - WDCH-FM: Washington–Baltimore
- Fox News Headlines: national
- NBC News Radio: national
- NPR (National Public Radio): national
- Pacifica Radio: national
- 24/7 News: national
- KYW and WPHI-FM: Philadelphia, Pennsylvania
- WBZ: Boston, Massachusetts
- WGL: Fort Wayne, Indiana
- WNUZ-LP: Gap, Pennsylvania (Pacifica Radio) (non-commercial)

=== South America ===
==== Argentina ====
- CNN Radio Argentina – all news rolling

==== Brazil ====
- CBN and Rádio Bandeirantes – two stations broadcast news 24/7
- BandNews FM – all news rolling for São Paulo
- Jovem Pan News – news for Brasilia

==== Chile ====
- ADN 91.7 – news, talk and sports
- CNN Chile Radio – all news rolling
- Radio Agricultura – news and opinion
- Radio Cooperativa – news and talk
- Tele13 Radio – all news rolling

==== Colombia ====
- Caracol Radio – news and talk
- RCN Radio – news and talk

==== Cuba ====
- Radio Reloj – the world's oldest all-news station, broadcasting live news and information 24/7 with continuous clock ticks in the background and a beep every minute

==== Peru ====
- Exitosa – news, talk and sports
- PBO – news, talk and sports
- RPP – news, talk and sports

==== Venezuela ====
- RNV Canal Informativo – all news rolling

=== Oceania ===
==== Australia ====
- ABC NewsRadio – national (Australian Broadcasting Corporation)
- 2GB – regional from Sydney (Nine Entertainment)
- 3AW – regional from Melbourne (Nine Entertainment)
- 4BC – regional from Brisbane (Nine Entertainment)
- 6PR – regional from Perth (Nine Entertainment)
- News24 Radio – national

==== New Zealand ====
- Newstalk ZB

=== International ===
BBC World Service

- BBC World Service
- China Radio International

== See also ==
- News broadcasting
