= Fred B. Walters =

Fred Walters
- Born: January 22, 1928; Philadelphia, Pennsylvania, U.S.
- Died: February 1, 2019 (aged 91)
- Education: University of Pennsylvania
- Occupations: News executive, broadcast journalist, author, professor
- Years active: 1953–1985 (broadcasting); 1985–2019 (consulting/teaching)
- Known for: Pioneering the all-news radio format First executive editor of KYW all-news format (1965)
- Spouse: Lilian P. Walters
- Awards: Broadcast Pioneers of Philadelphia Hall of Fame (2014); Roy E. Morgan Award for Broadcast Excellence (2013)
- Military career
- Branch: United States Navy
- Service years: mid-1940s (3.5 years)

Frederick B. "Fred" Walters (January 22, 1928 – February 1, 2019) was an American broadcast executive, journalist, author, and professor who helped pioneer the all-news radio format through his work as the first executive editor of KYW in Philadelphia. Known for stressing fairness, accuracy, objective analysis, and live reporting, he established operational standards that would be replicated at all-news stations across the country. He was inducted into the Hall of Fame of the Philadelphia Broadcast Pioneers on November 21, 2014 and in 2013 received the Roy E. Morgan Award for Broadcast Excellence from the Pennsylvania Associated Press Broadcasters Association.

== Early life and education ==
A native Philadelphian, Walters was born on January 22, 1928. He served in the U.S. Navy for three and a half years in the mid-1940s. After his military service, he initially enrolled at Purdue University before transferring to the University of Pennsylvania, where he graduated with honors with a Bachelor of Arts in Journalism in 1953. During his senior year at Penn, he began working for The Associated Press as a copy boy and won a place on the editorial staff even before his graduation.

== Broadcast career ==
Walters began his career with The Associated Press in Philadelphia while still an undergraduate at the University of Pennsylvania. Within a few years, the AP transferred him to its Harrisburg bureau, where he spent six years covering the House of Representatives.

He left the AP in November 1963 to serve as press secretary for Philadelphia industrialist Milton Shapp's campaign for the United States Senate. When Shapp withdrew from the race, Walters took his first broadcasting job as a reporter for WIP-AM in Philadelphia. During his tenure at WIP-AM, he produced a two-week investigative series examining the civil rights movement in Chester, Pennsylvania, which earned him his first broadcasting award—an honorable mention from the National Conference of Christians and Jews in 1964.

=== Pioneering all-news radio ===
In July 1965, Walters began what would become a 19-year association with Westinghouse Broadcasting Company. He was the editor on duty when Westinghouse's KYW launched its all-news format on September 21, 1965, becoming the station's first executive editor. Newscaster Steve Porter read the first newscast, which had been edited by Walters, opening with "This is KYW News Radio. I'm Steve Porter, your editor Fred Walters."

Walters faced unique challenges in creating the all-news format, later recalling: "Remember, I came out of the print side of the business, and these were unfamiliar tools for me to work with." His successful integration of print journalism principles with broadcast techniques helped establish KYW Newsradio as a respected news operation.

In June 1966, he became chief of the Westinghouse news bureau in Harrisburg, with Jay Strassburg succeeding him as editor at KYW. While heading the bureau, which served Westinghouse stations in Philadelphia and Pittsburgh, Walters achieved several milestones for broadcast journalism. In 1968, he successfully lobbied for formal recognition of broadcast journalists in the Pennsylvania General Assembly's media access rules, establishing parity between broadcast and print reporters. That same year, he became the first television journalist to film the Pennsylvania Senate in session.

In 1969, he returned to KYW Newsradio as news director and then executive editor. Under his leadership, KYW became the only all-news station rated Number One in a major American market. In 1978, he was transferred to the company's all-news station WINS in New York City. In 1980, he was appointed National Political Correspondent for Westinghouse Broadcasting.

From September 1980 to 1983, Walters left Westinghouse to become news director of the ABC-owned radio station WXYZ-AM in Detroit. Within a year of his arrival, WXYZ earned the designation "Michigan's Most Honored News Team" based on Associated Press and United Press International state competition awards. The station repeated that honor the following year and also received a national Society of Professional Journalists award for investigative reporting.

He returned to Westinghouse in 1983 as executive editor of its all-news station KFWB in Los Angeles, retiring from the company in 1985.

He planned, organized and produced coverage of such special events as elections (local, state and national), 1976 United States Bicentennial celebrations in Philadelphia and Valley Forge, the 1976 Eucharistic Congress in Philadelphia (a quadrennial international event of the Roman Catholic Church, held in the United States for the first time in 40 years), the Legionnaires' disease outbreak at the Bellevue-Stratford Hotel in Philadelphia, inauguration of legalized gambling in Atlantic City in 1978, the 1980 papal visit to New York City, and the 1984 Los Angeles Olympics.

Walters also directed local news coverage of several major breaking news stories over the years, including the 1972 Pennsylvania floods, the bombing of the U.S. Marine barracks in Beirut in 1983, Vietnam protest demonstrations, Watergate hearings, the 1969 Moon Landing, auto industry labor negotiations, the explosion of the Shuttle Challenger in 1986, and many natural disasters such as snowstorms, floods, fires (including California brush fires), and earthquakes.

== Philosophy and approach ==
Walters believed strongly in journalism as a public service, a principle he instilled in the journalists he mentored. Coming from print journalism, he emphasized accuracy, fairness, and objective analysis while adapting these principles to the immediacy of broadcast news. He pioneered the use of live reporting as a standard practice in radio news.

Walters drew a sharp distinction between interviewing and reporting. In a 2014 column, he wrote: "Interviewing isn't reporting as I understood and practiced the profession. Interviewing is only a step—a second step, really—towards good reporting. The first step is research to prepare the interviewer's questions. The final step is putting the raw material of the interview into context." He expressed concern that modern broadcast journalism had become dominated by "endless interviews but little context" and worried that "the art of reporting these days seems to be a lost skill, especially with the broadcast media."

In his later commentary writing, Walters reflected on the evolution of American society and media. He wrote about witnessing the transformation from a "white-male-dominated society" of his youth to an increasingly diverse America, noting how these changes were reflected in news broadcasts and advertising. He also expressed concern about the role of racism and disrespect in American politics, particularly during the Obama administration.

Walters valued the "Theater of the Mind" that radio created, recalling family gatherings around the radio listening to programs like The Shadow and The Lone Ranger. He believed imagination was a crucial element that audio entertainment demanded from its audience.

=== Writing style ===
Walters admired journalism that achieved literary quality within deadline constraints. He particularly praised evocative leads, citing examples such as "They buried a generation here today" from coverage of a 1950 train disaster, and "The uneasy earth shifted under Wilkes-Barre again today" by AP reporter Russ Lindstrom. He noted that "sports writers often are among the best writers in the business" but lamented that obituary writers, despite their potential for compelling storytelling, "generally don't make the anthologies."

== Post-broadcast career ==
After retiring from Westinghouse in 1985, Walters formed his own consultancy, News Horizons, which operated from both Pennsylvania and North Hollywood, California. He also became an adjunct professor of journalism at Lebanon Valley College in Annville, Pennsylvania.

During this period, Walters became a regular commentator on media and politics, writing columns for the Harrisburg Patriot-News website that addressed topics ranging from journalism ethics to social change. His commentary addressed diverse topics including the commercialization of American culture, observing that "our years no longer are divided by the seasons of spring, summer, fall and winter. Rather, they have become defined by shopping periods and sporting events." He also wrote about race relations in contemporary America, reflecting on Ferguson and similar incidents as potential "echoes of the past" that revealed "the reality that these feelings of separateness linger in many people."

Beyond racial issues, Walters examined broader issues of American partisan dysfunction, criticizing Republicans in 2015 for departing from the tradition that "foreign policy differences end at the shores of the United States" when they invited Netanyahu to address Congress and sent a letter to Iranian leaders during nuclear negotiations. He argued such actions "diminished President Obama and thereby the United States in the world's eyes."

== Professional memberships ==
In addition to his journalism credentials, Walters was a member of the Society of Professional Journalists and as president of the Philadelphia chapter chaired the organization's national convention in 1976. He served as president of the Pennsylvania Legislative Correspondents' Association from 1962-63 and was the founding president of the Capitol Press Club (which has since been disbanded). As president of the Pennsylvania Legislative Correspondents' Association, he successfully gained formal recognition of broadcasters in the rules of the Pennsylvania General Assembly, helping establish broadcast journalists' equal standing with print reporters in the state capitol.

== Written works ==
Walters wrote a biography of a Revolutionary War hero, John Haslet: A Useful One, published in 2005. The 418-page book tells the story of an Irish immigrant who settled in Delaware, involved himself early on in the Patriot cause, then organized and led one of the outstanding regiments in the Continental Army, the Delaware Continentals. Haslet was killed at the Battle of Princeton in January 1777, and the legend is that George Washington wept over his body on the battlefield. For the title, Walters drew from an essay by historian Whitefield Bell that while people like Thomas Jefferson and Benjamin Franklin "crowd history's galleries", it was the people who implemented their visions that were "the useful ones."

His columns for the Harrisburg Patriot-News website were collected into an e-book entitled News Horizons, published in 2015. The book presents his analysis and commentary on news media, politics, government, and current affairs from the perspective of a veteran journalist.

== Awards ==
Walters received numerous awards throughout his career. His first broadcasting honor came in 1964 when the National Conference of Christians and Jews recognized his investigative series on the civil rights movement in Chester, Pennsylvania.

He won awards from the National Headliner Awards and the Society of Professional Journalists, and directed news staffs in Philadelphia and Detroit that were consistently recognized as the best in their respective states. At WXYZ Detroit, he transformed the station's news operation within his first year, leading it to consecutive state broadcasting honors from the Associated Press and United Press International in 1981 and 1982, along with a national Society of Professional Journalists award for investigative reporting.

In 2013, he received the Roy E. Morgan Award for Broadcast Excellence from the Pennsylvania Associated Press Broadcasters Association.

== Personal life ==
Walters died on February 1, 2019, at his residence at the age of 91. He was survived by his wife, Lilian P. Walters. In his later years, he wrote about becoming a great-grandparent and the changing family dynamics that come with age, noting that great-grandparents become "family legends" who are "taken out every so often to retrieve memories of the past."

== Legacy ==
=== Impact on all-news format ===
Walters is remembered as a pioneering figure in the development of the all-news radio format. As KYW's first executive editor when it launched its all-news format in 1965, he helped establish a model that would be replicated at stations across the country. His success in bridging print and broadcast journalism created a template for the industry.

=== Mentorship ===
His influence extended beyond his own newsroom through the journalists he mentored and hired. NBC News correspondent Andrea Mitchell, who worked under Walters at KYW, credited him as "the reason I am doing what I do today" and called him her "inspiration, mentor, teacher, the person who taught me the foundations of journalism." She noted that Walters "gave us the license to go anywhere and pursue any story" and "set an example of journalism as a public service," while protecting his reporters from political pressure "without even telling me."

Other notable journalists who worked under Walters include Jay Lloyd, who became a longtime KYW reporter, and Bob Witten, whom Walters recruited from WRSC State College to KYW in 1969, launching Witten's major market career.

Former KYW director of news and programming Steve Butler noted that Walters was "at the helm of KYW at the beginning, building the all-news brand and hiring an incredibly talented staff." The Broadcast Pioneers of Philadelphia, in inducting Walters into their Hall of Fame in 2014, noted that he "did everything you'd expect a pioneer to do" and recognized his role in leading KYW to its number one rating.
