= Image News FM (Nepal) =

Radio station in Nepal

Image News FM 103.6
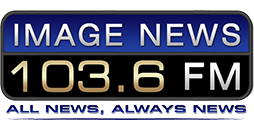
- Type: FM station
- Country: Nepal
- Founded: September 2008
- Headquarters: Kathmandu
- Parent: Image Group of Companies
- Key people: Raj Manandhar
- Official website: imagenewsfm.com.np

Image News FM (Nepali: इमेज न्युज एफ.एम.) is the first and only 24-hour all-news radio channel in Nepal, broadcasting on 103.6 FM in Kathmandu. It was established in September 14, 2008.

It is owned by the Image Group of Companies, which also runs Image Channel, Image FM 97.9 and Image Khabar.

The station offers eight 30-minute news programmes each day at 00:30, 05:30, 06:30, 10:30, 12:30, 15:30, 18:30 and 21:30, with 15-minute news programmes airing at all other bottom-of-the-hours. The rest of the schedule is filled with opinionated, discussion, and various other news-based programmes.
