= KYW (AM) =

All-news radio station in Philadelphia

- Philadelphia, Pennsylvania; United States
- Broadcast area: Philadelphia metropolitan area
- Frequency: 1060 kHz
- Branding: KYW Newsradio

Programming
- Format: All-news radio
- Affiliations: ABC News Radio; Associated Press; Bloomberg Radio; WCAU

Ownership
- Owner: Audacy, Inc.; (Audacy License, LLC)
- Sister stations: WBEB; WIP-FM; WOGL; WPHI-FM; WPHT; WTDY-FM

History
- First air date: November 11, 1921 (in Chicago, moved to Philadelphia in 1934)
- Former call signs: KYW (1921–1928); KYW-KFKX (1928–1933); WRCV (1956–1965)

Technical information
- Licensing authority: FCC
- Facility ID: 25441
- Class: A
- Power: 50,000 watts (unlimited)
- Transmitter coordinates: 40°6′12.4″N 75°14′54.64″W
- Repeaters: 94.1 WIP-FM HD2 (Philadelphia); 103.9 WPHI-FM (Jenkintown)

Links
- Public license information: Public file; LMS
- Webcast: Listen live (via Audacy)
- Website: www.audacy.com/kywnewsradio

KYW (1060 kHz) is a commercial AM radio station licensed to serve Philadelphia, Pennsylvania. It is one of the oldest continuously operating radio stations in the United States, originating in Chicago before moving to Philadelphia in 1934. KYW's unusual history includes its call sign of only three letters, beginning with a K, rare for a station in the Eastern United States. It broadcasts an all-news radio format and is branded as "KYW Newsradio". KYW serves as the flagship station of Audacy, Inc. KYW's studios are co-located within Audacy's corporate headquarters in Center City Philadelphia and its transmitter and two-tower directional antenna array are located in Lafayette Hill, Pennsylvania.

KYW is a 50,000–watt class A clear channel station. It is one of two clear-channel stations in Philadelphia, the other being sister station WPHT. With a good radio receiver, its nighttime signal can be heard in much of the Eastern United States and Eastern Canada; however, it restricts its signal towards the Southwest United States to protect XECPAE-AM in Mexico City, which shares Class A status on AM 1060. The station's signal is restricted towards the Northeast United States to protect the signal of WEPN in New York City, which is one frequency away at 1050 AM. KYW Newsradio's programming is also available via a simulcast on sister station 103.9 WPHI-FM and the HD2 subchannel of sister station 94.1 WIP-FM.

== History ==
=== Origin in Chicago (1921) ===
In November 1920, the Westinghouse Electric & Manufacturing Company established its first broadcasting station, KDKA, located at its plant in East Pittsburgh, Pennsylvania, to promote the sales of its radio receivers. This initial station proved successful, so in 1921, the company developed plans to set up additional stations in major population centers, including WJZ in Newark, New Jersey (now WABC in New York City), and WBZ, originally in Springfield, Massachusetts, and now in Boston. It also wanted to start a station in Chicago.

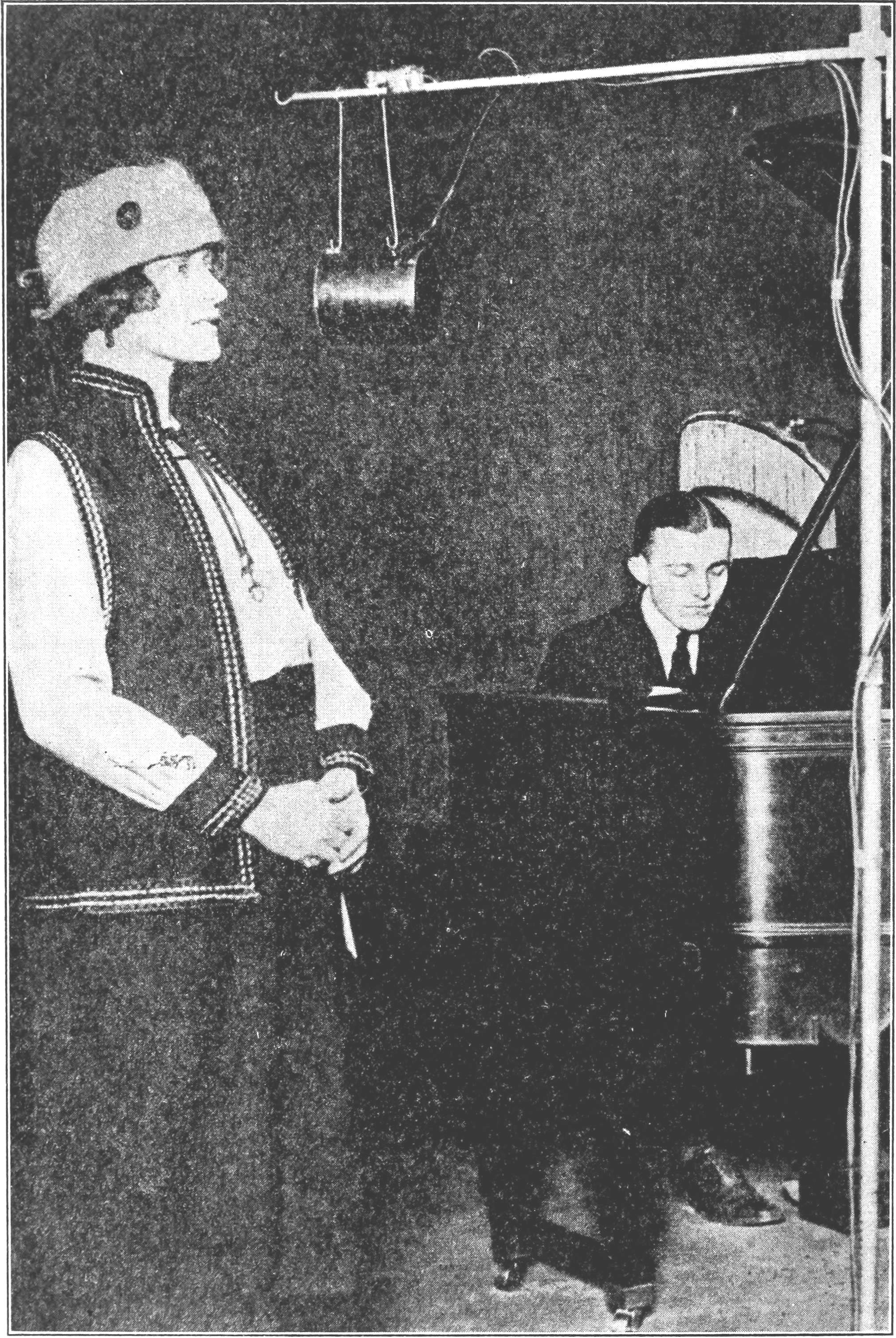
"Miss Forster singing [a lullaby] for her audience of a hundred thousand" from Chicago (1922)

The Westinghouse station was first licensed on November 15, 1921, as Chicago's first broadcasting outlet, with the randomly assigned call letters of KYW. At first, it was jointly operated by Westinghouse and Commonwealth Edison, with Westinghouse later taking over as sole operator. Through the financial support of Samuel Insull, and the cooperation of Mary Garden, director general of the Chicago Opera Company, KYW's initial broadcasts consisted of the opera company's entire 6-day-a-week winter season schedule. Ten microphones were installed across the Chicago Civic Auditorium stage, with equipment for switching between them as needed. After the close of the opera season, KYW installed a studio in the Commonwealth Edison building, and began producing additional programming. By fall of 1922, the station was operating for 12 hours a day.

In 1927, Westinghouse affiliated its four radio stations (KYW, KDKA in Pittsburgh, WBZ in Springfield and WBZA in Boston) with the National Broadcasting Company's (NBC) Blue Network, originating from WJZ in New York City, which had been transferred from Westinghouse to the Radio Corporation of America (RCA) in 1923. Westinghouse had been a founding partner of RCA, NBC's original parent company.

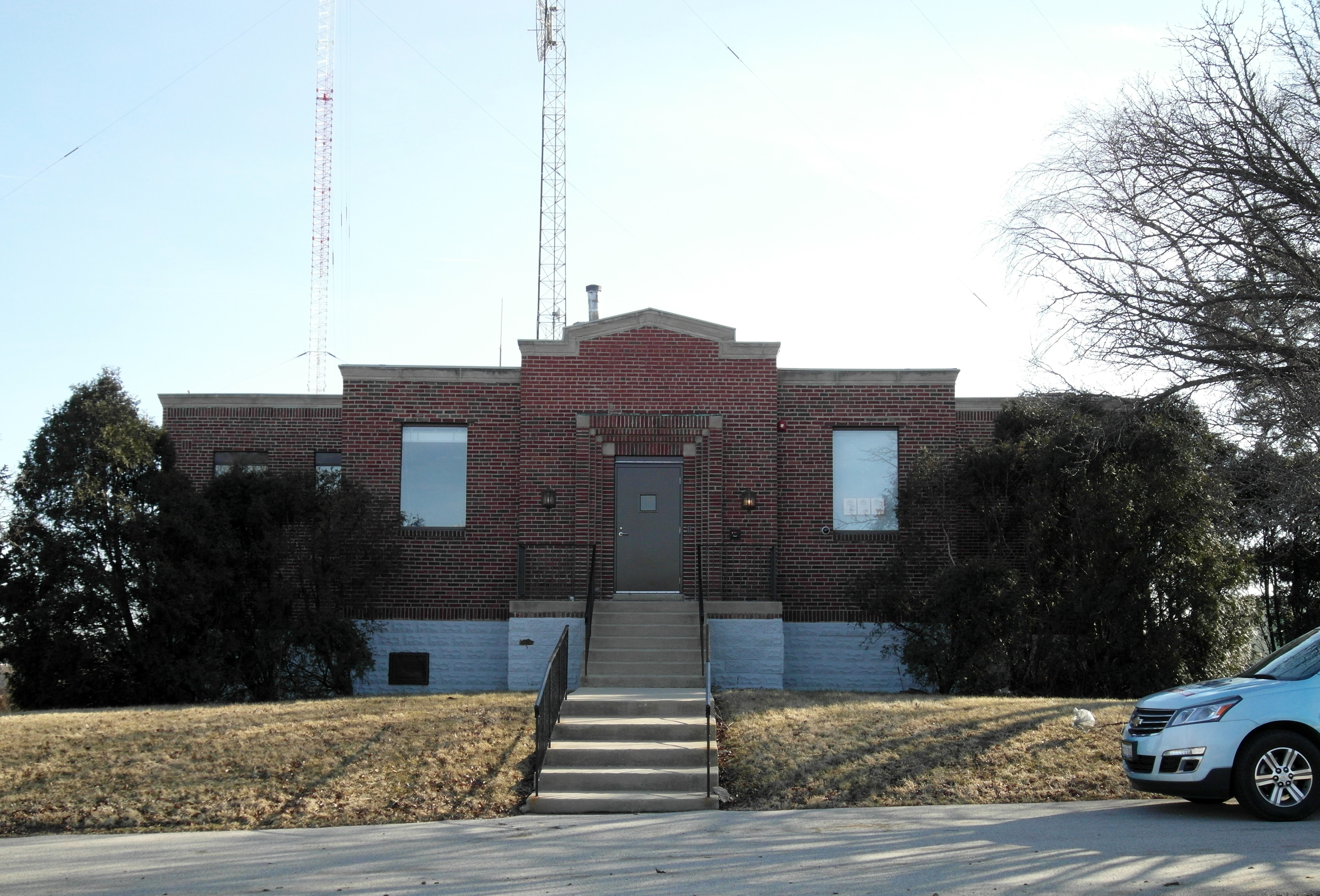
KYW's former transmitter building in Bloomingdale Township

In 1923, Westinghouse had established a station, KFKX in Hastings, Nebraska, located near the center of the country. This station was designed to serve a dual purpose, of providing agricultural programming, and for testing the practicality of shortwave transmitters for linking radio networks, with KFKX receiving much of its programming by shortwave from KDKA in Pittsburgh. In 1927, the project was abandoned, although it was announced that the KFKX programming was being consolidated with KYW. Westinghouse now controlled two stations in addition to KYW in the Chicago area: KFKX and WEBH. On September 1, 1928, the Federal Radio Commission (FRC) ordered that their operations should be consolidated. WEBH was deleted, and the other two stations were merged, with a dual call letter assignment of KYW-KFKX, although the latter call sign would be rarely if ever used after 1930.

Under the provisions of the FRC's General Order 40, a sweeping reallocation of frequencies was implemented on November 11, 1928, and KYW was assigned to 1020 kHz. Its transmitter was moved from the top of Chicago's Congress Hotel to west suburban Bloomingdale Township. The signal experienced difficulties in covering the entire city of Chicago, so a relay transmitter on the same frequency, KYWA, was set up, although it was deleted in the spring of 1930.

On May 15, 1933, after the FRC requested that stations using only one of their assigned call letters drop those that were no longer in regular use, KFKX was eliminated and the station reverted to just KYW.

=== Move to Philadelphia (1934) ===
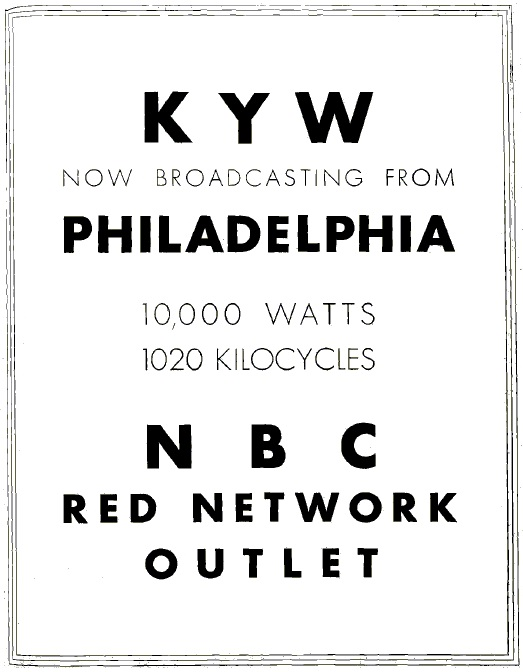
Station advertisement announcing its move to Philadelphia (1934)

KYW assignment to the clear channel frequency of 1020 kHz caused a major problem. Under the provisions of the "Davis Amendment", eight clear channel frequencies were to be allocated to each of five national regions. Chicago was located in Region 4, while the reallocation provisions had reserved 1020 kHz for Region 2, a grouping of mid-Atlantic states. Westinghouse fought a long legal battle, attempting to keep KYW operating as a clear channel station on 1020 in Chicago. Finally it proposed moving the station to a Region 2 location, settling on Philadelphia. However, numerous other stations made alternative proposals to be assigned this allocation, and the matter was placed in the hands of an FRC examiner, who held hearings in July 1932 to sort through 23 conflicting applications from 16 stations. Examiner Pratt's recommendation concluded that KYW's willingness to move to Philadelphia was the best possible outcome.

After broadcasting its last program in Chicago on December 2, 1934, KYW aired its debut Philadelphia program the next day. Westinghouse used the studios and sales operations of WCAU. The move made KYW the easternmost U.S. radio station with a call sign beginning with "K". When KYW moved to Philadelphia, it changed from NBC Blue to NBC Red, predecessor of modern-day NBC, an affiliation it maintained during the remainder of the 1930s and throughout the 1940s; KYW was thus unaffected when, in 1942, the Federal Communications Commission (FCC) compelled RCA to divest itself of one of its two radio networks, resulting in the divestiture of the NBC Blue network (which later became the American Broadcasting Company). In mid-May 1938, KYW moved to new studios at 1619 Walnut Street in Center City.

On March 29, 1941, KYW's clear channel assignment was shifted from 1020 to 1060 kHz, its current frequency, as part of a nationwide adjustment of assignments engineered by the North American Regional Broadcasting Agreement (NARBA). In 1942, KYW added an FM station at 45.7 MHz, W57PH. It largely simulcast KYW's programming and later moved to 92.5 MHz as KYW-FM when the FM dial was shifted. Development of FM radio was slow and Westinghouse decided to shut down KYW-FM in mid-1954; the equipment was donated to the Delaware Valley Educational Television Corporation and the Philadelphia Board of Education.

KYW acquired a television counterpart in late February 1953, when Westinghouse bought WPTZ (channel 3), the nation's third commercial television station and NBC's second television affiliate, from Philco.

=== KYW Cleveland/WRCV Philadelphia (1956–1965) ===
In June 1955, Westinghouse agreed to trade KYW and WPTZ to NBC in exchange for NBC's Cleveland properties, WTAM-AM-FM and WNBK television; Westinghouse also received $3 million in cash compensation. The main impetus for the trade was NBC's desire to acquire an owned-and-operated television station in the fourth-largest American television market. NBC had to receive a waiver for the swap because KYW and NBC Radio's New York City flagship, WRCA (now WFAN) were both clear channel stations. At the time, the FCC normally did not allow common ownership of clear channel stations with overlapping nighttime coverage. After clearing the final regulatory hurdles, the swap went into effect on January 22, 1956.

On February 13, NBC changed KYW's call letters in Philadelphia to WRCV (for the RCA-Victor record label). At the same time, Westinghouse changed the call letters of its new Cleveland station from WTAM to KYW. The Westinghouse-NBC station swap, and its subsequent reversal nine years later, resulted in two ways to recount KYW's history. In the records of the FCC, the station in Philadelphia on 1060 kHz merely underwent two call letter and ownership changes, taking place in 1956 and 1965. However most KYW histories follow the path of the call letters, and refer to KYW moving from Philadelphia to Cleveland in 1956, then returning to Philadelphia nine years later.

Based on its responsibilities as an NBC-owned outlet, WRCV carried all of NBC's network programming, such as the weekend Monitor magazine-style program. Philadelphia radio personality Hy Lit briefly worked at WRCV during the first year of NBC ownership, hosting a local rock-and-roll program and an adult standards show for the NBC network. WRCV adopted a big band format featuring swing music popular during the pre-rock era.

=== Return to Philadelphia (1965) ===
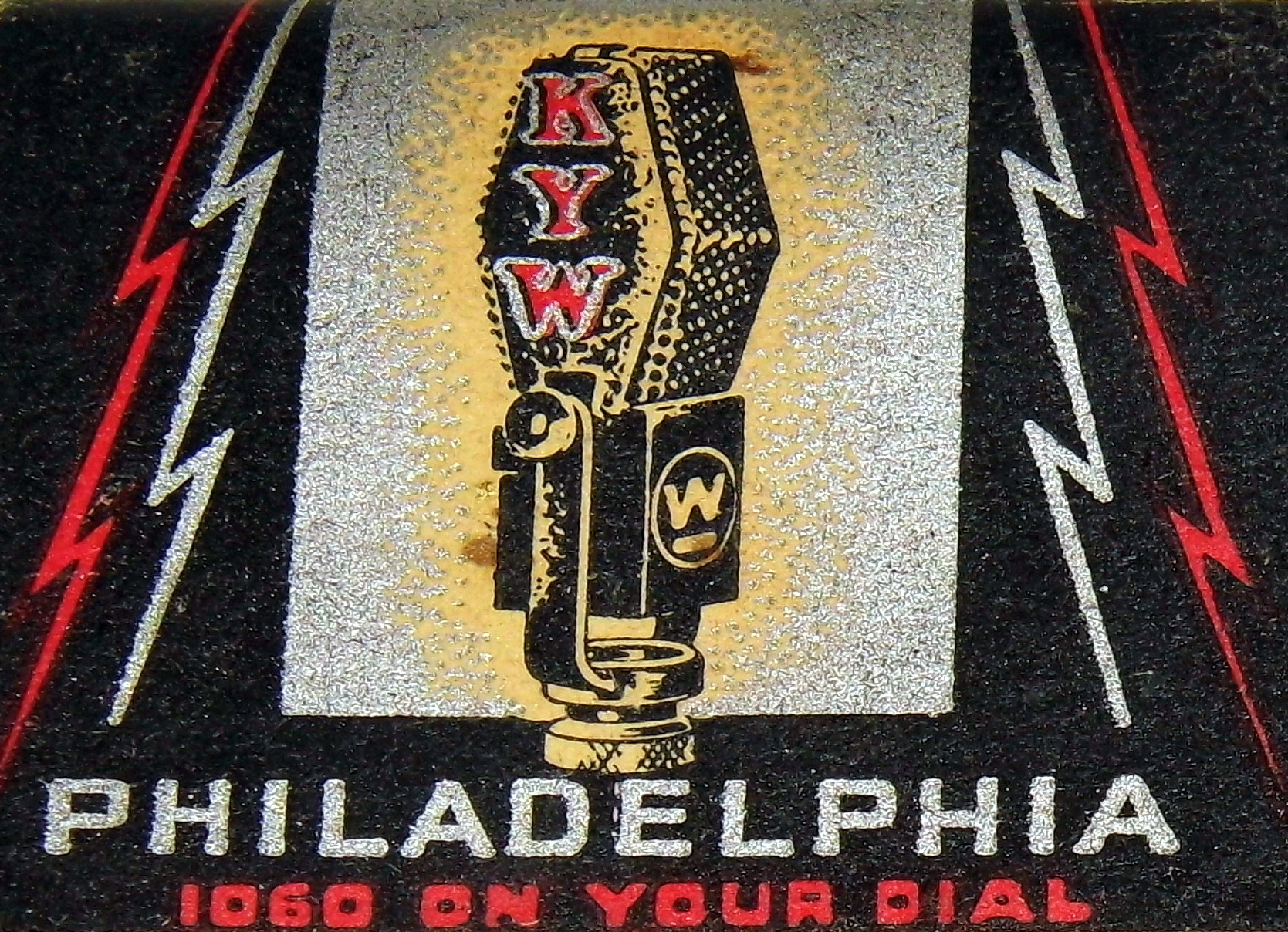
KYW 1060 AM matchbook ad

Almost immediately after the NBC-Westinghouse trade was finalized, Westinghouse complained to the FCC and the United States Department of Justice that it had been coerced into making the station swap, including a threat by NBC to revoke Westinghouse's NBC-TV affiliations. A lengthy investigation was launched. In September 1959, the Justice Department issued a decision which, in part, instructed NBC to divest WRCV-AM-TV by the end of 1962. Several months later in early 1960, NBC announced it would trade its Philadelphia stations to RKO General in exchange for that company's Boston outlets, WNAC-AM-FM-TV. That proposed station swap was held up for nearly four years until the FCC issued a final decision in August 1964. The Commission renewed NBC's licenses for WRCV radio and television, on the condition that the 1956 station swap with Westinghouse be reversed. RKO General initially contested the FCC's decision, but soon gave up its efforts and bowed out of the competition. Following nearly a year of appeals by NBC, Westinghouse regained control of WRCV-AM-TV on June 19, 1965, and subsequently restored the KYW call letters to the radio station. The television station became KYW-TV at this point.

=== All-news format ===
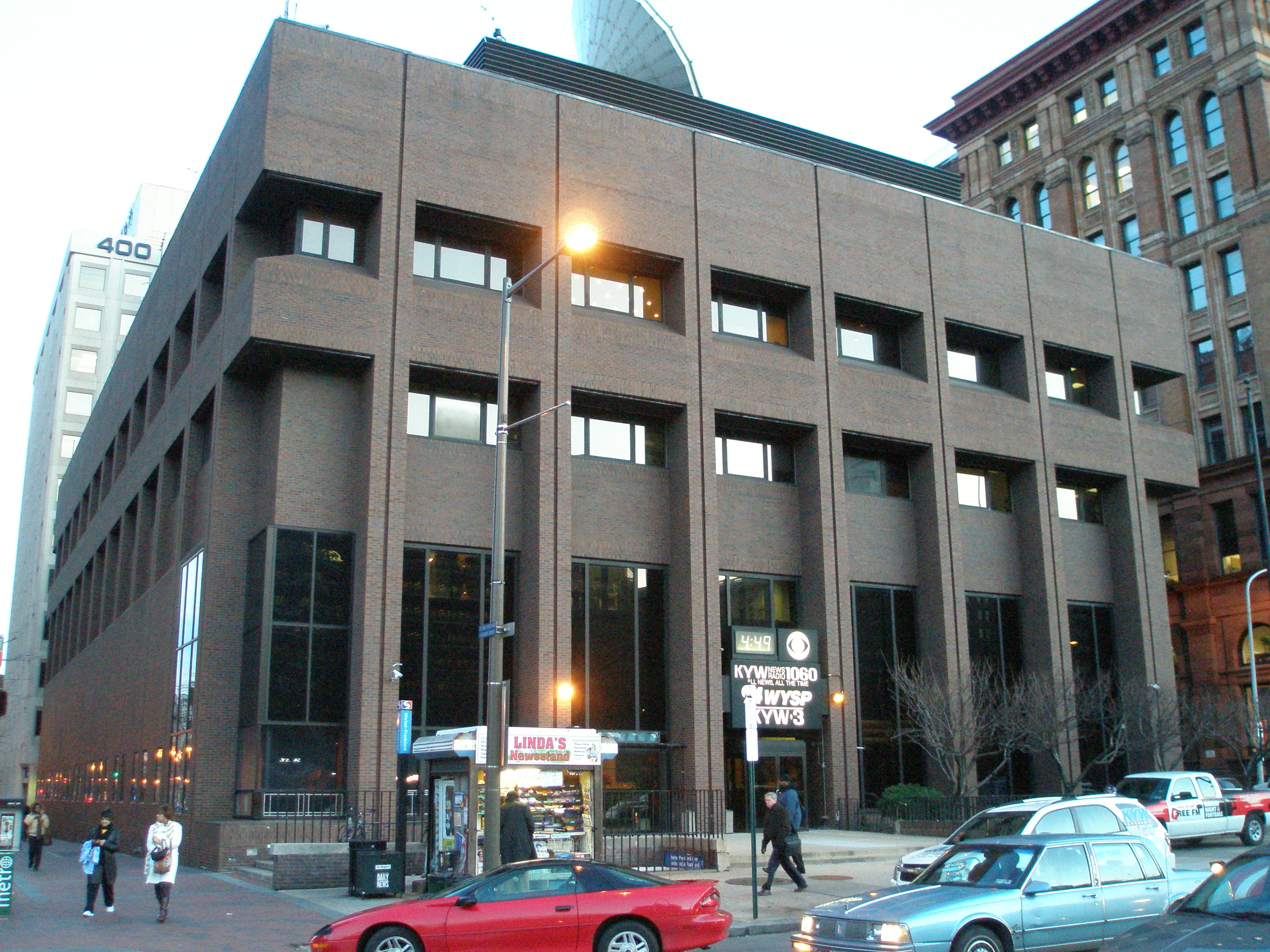
The former KYW Building on Independence Mall East, used by the station from 1972 to 2007. This building has since been demolished and replaced by the National Museum of American Jewish History.

On September 21, 1965, shortly after Westinghouse regained control of 1060 AM, the newly revived KYW dropped its NBC radio affiliation. The last song played before the flip was Que Sera, Sera (Whatever Will Be, Will Be) by Doris Day. It became one of the first radio stations in the country to switch to an all-news radio format. Newscaster Steve Porter read the first newscast, which had been edited by Fred B. Walters, the former Harrisburg bureau chief and eventual executive editor. The new format was part of Westinghouse's decision to put all-news formats on its large market AM stations. Five months earlier the company had converted WINS in New York City from a Top 40 format to all-news. A third conversion was made three years later at another Westinghouse-owned station, KFWB in Los Angeles. The Westinghouse trio of all-news stations made numerous contributions to developing the all-news format.

In 1972, KYW moved to new studios in Independence Mall East, at Fifth and Market streets, where it would remain for the next 35 years.

KYW has long been a leader in the Philadelphia radio market, although its audience had naturally reduced due to the decline of AM as a whole. KYW-TV took advantage of the radio station's popularity by incorporating a version of KYW's musical sounder into its news themes from 1991 to 2003. In addition, KYW Newsradio This Morning aired on co-owned WPSG (channel 57) in the early 2000s, adapting KYW's "news blocks" to television (though it was not a simulcast of KYW itself). KYW anchors and reporters were seen on morning television delivering the news.

=== Changes in ownership ===
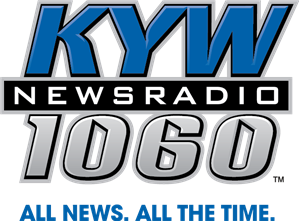
KYW logo from March 2005 to May 2019. The KYW call letters and 1060 frequency are depicted in the standard Westinghouse Broadcasting typeface, which the station started using following the call letters' return to Philadelphia in 1965.

In 1995, Westinghouse Electric announced its purchase of CBS. Upon its completion KYW became a sister station to its long-time rival, CBS-owned WGMP (1210 AM, now WPHT). That station, under its original WCAU call letters, had attempted during the late 1970s to compete with KYW with all-news programming. The effort failed, with WCAU switching to a talk format after a three-year effort.

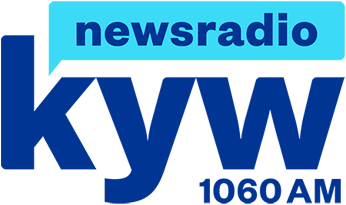
Modernized KYW logo used from May 2019 to November 2020, prior to the introduction of the 103.9 FM signal.

From 1986 to 1998, KYW used the C-QUAM AM Stereo system, but abandoned stereo broadcasts about the time of the CBS-Westinghouse merger and went back to standard monophonic broadcasts. The station previously used the HD Radio digital system created by iBiquity beginning in 2007 after an initial testing period.

In March 2007, the studios moved one half-block to 400 Market Street in Center City Philadelphia, which allowed for the construction of the National Museum of American Jewish History. In March 2014, KYW radio and television relocated to the sixth floor of 1555 Hamilton Street in Philadelphia, in what was initially referred to on-air as the "CBS Broadcast Center".

In November 2017, CBS Radio merged with Entercom, which is based in Philadelphia. Entercom had never previously owned a station in its home market. The transaction separated KYW from its television counterparts, and marked the first time since its establishment 96 years earlier that KYW was no longer owned by a direct descendant of Westinghouse.

KYW radio ended its longtime partnership with KYW-TV on February 10, 2020, and began broadcasting traffic, news, and weather information from NBC-owned WCAU (channel 10). The change coincided with KYW radio's move from the CBS Broadcast Center (which continues to house KYW-TV) to 2400 Market Street, along with Entercom's other Philadelphia radio stations and its corporate headquarters.

KYW broke from its all-news format on November 3, 2022, to simulcast Game 5 of the 2022 World Series, which involved the Philadelphia Phillies, with WPHT. The Phillies' flagship station, WIP-FM (94.1), could not air the game because of a conflict with the Philadelphia Eagles, who were playing a Thursday Night Football game at the same time.

After CBS News Radio's shut down, KYW switched its top-of-the-hours news updates to ABC News Radio.

== See also ==
- List of initial AM-band station grants in the United States
- List of three-letter broadcast call signs in the United States
