= Rádio 94FM =

Leiria; Portugal
- Frequency: 94.0 MHz

Programming
- Format: CHR

History
- First air date: 1985; 40 years ago
- Last air date: 12 July 2024
- Former names: Rádio Comercial de Leiria (1985–1997)

Rádio 94FM was a local radio station in Portugal broadcasting from the city of Leiria. It operated between 1985 and 12 July 2024, after which the station was bought by Observador becoming a relayer of Rádio Observador.

== History ==
The station's origins date back to the late summer period of 1985, when Joaquim Rodrigues, Agostinho Peçanha, Luís Perdigão, Mª Isabel Vicente and Victor Manuel Marques founded Rádio Comercial de Leiria. Like many local radio stations of the time, RCL was a pirate station, having been granted a regular license in 1989. The station promoted pop music in the 90s, in order to achieve a wider public, aside from its carriage of local and regional news.

New management took over the station in August 1997, adopting Rádio 94FM as its name, and changing the format. Accolades during the initial year of the reformat included competitions taking listeners to London, offering free convertible GTIs for a month and, for over a year, had the successful television presenter Jorge Gabriel as an announcer. These changes were fruitful for the station, as it became the most-heard local radio station in central Portugal according to Marktest.

On 27 April 2001, 94FM opened a subsidiary station in Cadaval, 94FM Oeste, on 94.2 FM. This station changed its physical headquarters in September 2004, carrying local programming and some relays from the head station in Leiria. With these two stations, 94FM consolidated its listener base in southern Leiria and parts of Santarém.

Winds from Subtropical Storm Alpha knocked off its tower in September 2020, with the tower damaged beyond repair.

The station was acquired by Grupo Observador in June 2024 and ceased broadcasting local programming at 3:57 p.m. on 12 July 2024, being replaced by a relay of Rádio Observador from Lisbon. With the acquisition, Leiria lost its last local radio station. Rádio Observador's new frequency was the sixth overall.
