= Emissora das Beiras =

Tondela; Portugal
- Frequency: 91.2 MHz

Programming
- Format: Portuguese music

History
- First air date: 13 May 1939; 86 years ago
- Last air date: 17 September 2024; 13 months ago (after 85 years, 127 days)

Emissora das Beiras (former callsign CSB-20) was a local radio station in Tondela, in central Portugal. The station was the oldest local radio station in Portugal, having been on air for 85 years at the time of its closure. The frequency is now occupied by Rádio Observador.

== History ==
The station opened on May 13, 1939 by Joaquim Seabra as Rádio Pólo Norte, founded by a group of tuberculosis patients at Estância Sanatorial do Caramulo. It was initially a pastime reserved to the patients, who later started expanding the signal illegally, and later, began regular broadcasts with an official license. The station broadcast on 1460kHz on the AM band, given at an ITU convention in Copenhagen. The name Pólo Norte (North Pole) was related to reminisce winter snow. There were plans for an FM frequency before 1974, but the owner rejected it frequently. Moreover, the station did not have problems during the Estado Novo regime. The station worked in association with O Primeiro de Janeiro from Porto. As of 1979, the station was set to be sold to a private company; it also relayed news bulletins from Rádio Renascença. The bidder would also set up an additional studio in Porto, owing to its AM coverage. The station was one of the few who escaped nationalization in 1975.

The station collapsed in the 1980s, forcing the creation of a joint stock company, AO TOM D’ELLA (Rádio), LDA., while the station, in 1989, adopted the new name "Rádio Tom Dela". At an unknown date in the 1990s, the startion reverted its name back to Emissora das Beiras.

On May 14, 2024, the station was acquired by Observador, who aimed to use its frequency to carry Rádio Observador in the Viseu and Tondela areas. From June 1, the station would start broadcasting a transitional service with a reduced crew before the takeover. On July 5, longtime station presenter Maria Helena left the station after 59 years on air; his husband had died the previous year. The transitional phase was supposed to end on October 1, but ended earlier than expected on September 17 at 5pm, when Rádio Observador used the former station's infrastructure to carry out coverage of wildfires in Viseu. Licensing limitations forbade the station from becoming a full-time relay of Observador.
