= Brooke's Point =

Municipality in Palawan, Philippines

Brooke's Point Bayan ng Brooke's Point
- Municipality
- Municipality of Brooke's Point
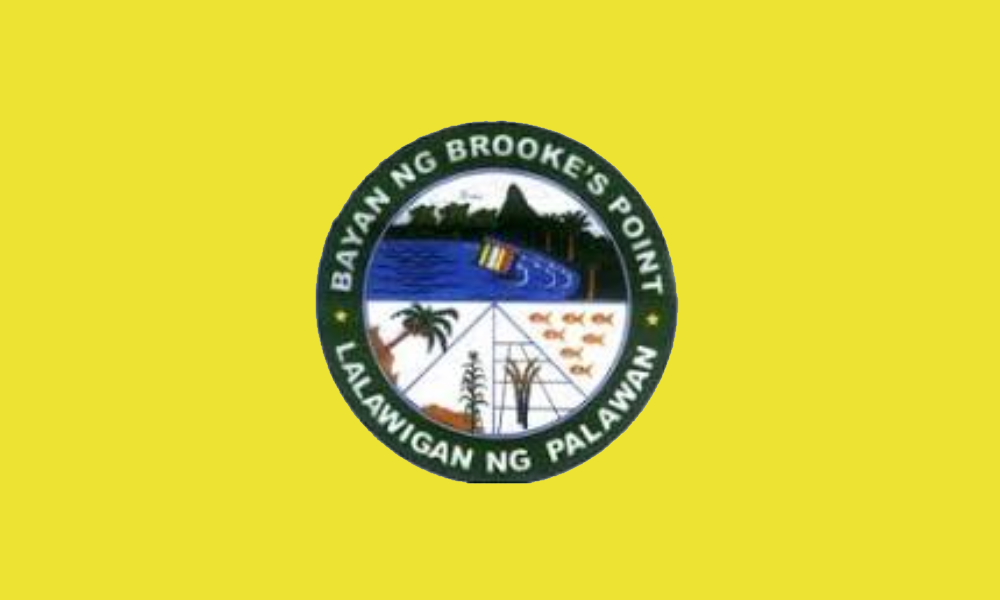
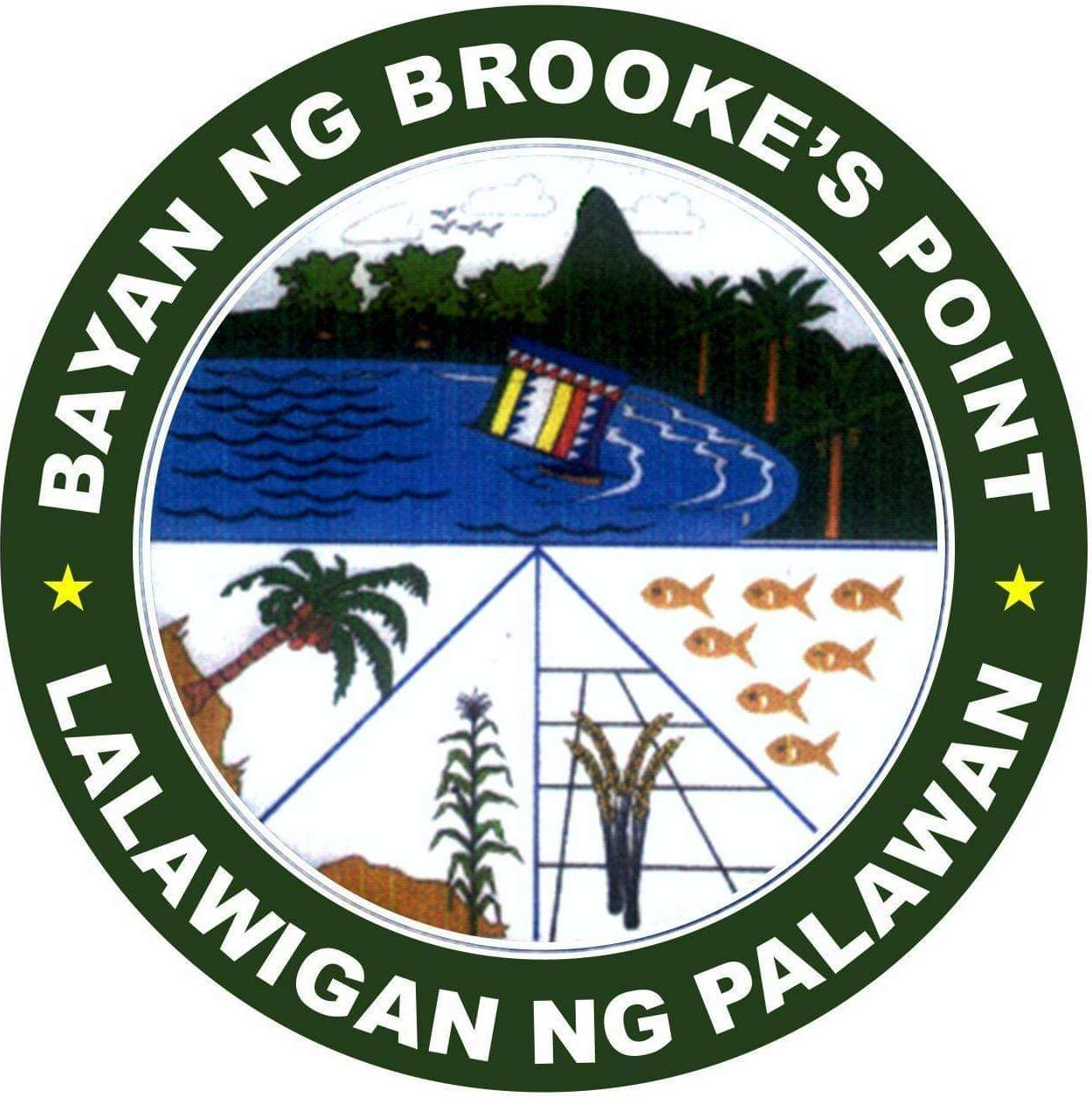
- Flag Seal

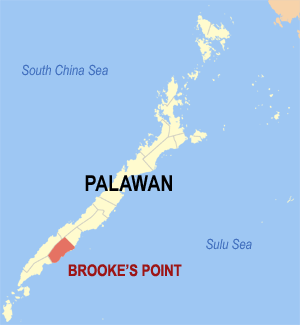
- Map of Palawan with Brooke's Point highlighted
- Interactive map of Brooke's Point
- Location within the Philippines
- Coordinates: 8°47′N 117°50′E
- Country: Philippines
- Region: Mimaropa
- Province: Palawan
- District: 2nd district
- Founded: June 28, 1949
- Named for: James Brooke
- Barangays: 18 (see Barangays)

Government
  - Type: Sangguniang Bayan
  - Mayor: Cesareo R. Benedito Jr.
  - Vice Mayor: Mary Jean D. Feliciano
  - Representative: Jose Ch. Alvarez
  - Municipal Council: Members: Sarah Jane C. Abon; Richard R. Balean; Ezekiel E. Rodriguez; Nathan Sam O. Lacanilao; Jonathan Z. Lagrada; Arturo B. Ferraris; Victoriano B. Colili; Hayati B. Dugasan
  - Electorate: 51,184 voters (2025)

Area
  - Total: 1,303.40 km^{2} (503.25 sq mi)
- Elevation: 9.0 m (29.5 ft)
- Highest elevation: 302 m (991 ft)
- Lowest elevation: 0 m (0 ft)

Population (2024 census)
  - Total: 76,715
  - Density: 58.858/km^{2} (152.44/sq mi)
  - Households: 18,478

Economy
  - Income class: 1st municipal income class
  - Poverty incidence: 27.24% (2023)
  - Revenue: ₱ 743 million (2024)
  - Assets: ₱ 1,852 million (2024)
  - Expenditure: ₱ 643.4 million (2024)
  - Liabilities: ₱ 428.1 million (2024)

Service provider
  - Electricity: Palawan Electric Cooperative (PALECO)
- Time zone: UTC+8 (PST)
- ZIP code: 5305
- PSGC: 1705306000
- IDD : area code: +63 (0)48
- Native languages: Molbog; Palawano; Taaw't Bato; Tagalog
- Website: http://brookespointpalawan.gov.ph/

Brooke's Point, officially the Municipality of Brooke's Point (Tagalog: Bayan ng Brooke's Point), is a municipality in the province of Palawan, Philippines. According to the 2024 census, it has a population of 76,715 people.

== Etymology ==
Before it was named Brooke's Point, it was named Bonbon, which means 'locality' in the Palawano language.

Brooke's Point is named after British soldier James Brooke, described as "the first white Rajah" of Sarawak and founder of the Brooke dynasty. It is believed that during one of his voyages, he landed on the tip of an island with a long narrow stretch of land inhabited by Palaweños and Muslims under the Sultanate of Sulu. During American rule, American scouts named the place Brooke's Point.

The name has now come under critical review, with some branding the naming of the municipality as "white worship" and the persistence of colonial mentality amidst Filipino sovereignty. Municipal officials have also demanded that the original name of the municipality, Bonbon (sometimes written as Bon-Bon), be restored.

== History ==
=== American colonial era ===
The supposed founder and organizer of the early settlers was Deputy Military Governor Edward Alexander Miller, who eventually became the Military Governor of Palawan. Fort Miller was an old building located in this town named after him. The first recorded Municipal President of Brooke's Point was Datu Pula.

The Pearl of Lao Tzu, formerly considered the world's largest pearl, was found in its waters on May 7, 1934.

=== World War II ===
At the outbreak of the war, local forces were organized. In 1943, the Imperial Japanese Army arrived and garrisoned the Central School building. Guerrilla forces began forming and within the same year, after conducting intelligence operations in the town, attacked the Japanese forces and caused their withdrawal to their launch, which were then sunk by guerrilla forces. Brooke's Point had been liberated. However, Japanese planes began bombing Brooke's Point until the duration of the war.

=== Post-war independence ===
On June 28, 1949, the Brooke's Point, formerly a municipal district, became a municipality by virtue of Executive Order No. 232 by then-President Elpidio Quirino.

The pioneer families who settled in Brooke's Point are the Villapa, Rodriguez, Setias, Valencia, Aspiras, Arzaga, and Edwards families.

In 1967, Datu Jolkiple Narrazid (also known as Datu Zulkifli II), the uncle of Mayor Sapiodin Narrazid, was elected as the municipality’s second mayor. His administration focused on the implementation of extensive socio-economic programs, with particular emphasis on the development and improvement of education.

==== Separation of Sofronio Española ====
On 3 August 1993, the House of Representatives approved Republic Act 7679, the law creating the Municipality of Sofronio Española in the Province of Palawan followed by the approval of the Senate on 24 November of the same year. Finally, the law creating Sofronio Española was lapsed into law. Hence, the barangays Pulot Center, Pulot Shore (Pulot I), Pulot Interior (Pulot II), Iraray, Punang, Labog, Panitian, Isumbo and Abo-Abo were separated from the Municipality of Brooke’s Point and constituted into a distinct and independent municipality of the province to be known as Sofronio Española. The seat of government of the new municipality was placed in Barangay Pulot Center.

== Geography ==
Brooke's Point is situated in the south-eastern section of Palawan Island, 190 kilometres (120 mi) from Puerto Princesa. It has a total land area of 85,064.90 hectares (210,199.9 acres) stretching about 20 kilometers (12 mi) along the length of Palawan. Brooke's Point is bounded by Sofronio Española in the north, Bataraza in the south, Rizal in the west, and the Sulu Sea in the east. The municipalities of Bataraza, Sofronio Española, and parts of Rizal and Quezon were once a part of Brooke's Point.

=== Barangays ===
Brooke's Point is subdivided into 18 barangays. Each barangay consists of puroks and some have sitios.

Currently, there are 2 barangays which classified as urban (highlighted in bold).

Samariñana was separated from Tanionbog in 1954.

- Amas
- Aribungos
- Barong-barong
- Calasaguen
- Imulnod
- Ipilan
- Maasin
- Mainit
- Malis
- Mambalot
- Oring-oring
- Pangobilian
- **Poblacion I**
- **Poblacion II**
- Salogon
- Samariñana
- Saraza (Taniongbobog)
- Tubtub

=== Climate ===
Climate data for Brooke's Point
Month	Jan	Feb	Mar	Apr	May	Jun	Jul	Aug	Sep	Oct	Nov	Dec	Year
Mean daily maximum °C (°F)	30 (86)	31 (88)	31 (88)	31 (88)	30 (86)	30 (86)	29 (84)	29 (84)	29 (84)	29 (84)	29 (84)	30 (86)	30 (86)
Mean daily minimum °C (°F)	23 (73)	23 (73)	23 (73)	24 (75)	25 (77)	25 (77)	25 (77)	25 (77)	25 (77)	25 (77)	24 (75)	24 (75)	24 (76)
Average precipitation mm (inches)	64 (2.5)	55 (2.2)	90 (3.5)	93 (3.7)	169 (6.7)	215 (8.5)	206 (8.1)	181 (7.1)	190 (7.5)	219 (8.6)	182 (7.2)	115 (4.5)	1,779 (70.1)
Average rainy days	13.1	11.5	17.3	19.4	26.8	26.8	27.8	26.9	27.1	28.3	25.4	20.1	270.5
Source: Meteoblue

== Demographics ==
Population census of Brooke's Point

Year	Pop.	±% p.a.
1918	18,080	—
1939	21,839	+0.90%
1948	28,476	+2.99%
1960	28,118	−0.11%
1970	26,961	−0.42%
1975	36,967	+6.53%
1980	46,320	+4.61%
1990	57,934	+2.26%

Year	Pop.	±% p.a.
1995	41,924	−5.88%
2000	48,928	+3.37%
2007	56,311	+1.96%
2010	61,301	+3.14%
2015	66,374	+1.53%
2020	73,994	+2.31%
2024	76,715	+0.87%

Source: Philippine Statistics Authority

In the 2024 census, the population of Brooke's Point was 76,715 people, with a density of 58.9 inhabitants per square kilometer or 153 inhabitants per square mile.

=== Religion ===
The municipality is predominantly Christian, with a sizable Muslim population. The local Muslim population is mostly native Palawano and Molbog peoples, there are also Maranao people who immigrated since the 1970s due to conflict with the government, as well as local converts known as Balik Islam ('reverts to Islam').

In 2024, the population in this municipality was predominantly Christianity (86.5%), then Islam (11.9%), and others (1.6%). Muslims are mostly spread along the coast and in native villages, while Christians are more evenly distributed throughout the area, besides tribal religious who mainly live in the interior and highlands.

Most residents are Catholics. Other Christian denominations include Members Church of God International, Iglesia ni Cristo, Jehovah's Witnesses, the Church of Jesus Christ of Latter-day Saints (LDS Church) and others.

The Catholic Church is located north of the town center while the Evangelical Christian Churches are the Gospel Hall, located north of the town center, the Iglesia ni Cristo, south of the municipal hall, the Church of Christ International's building is located in Old Camp while the LDS Church chapel is in Edward's Subdivision.

== Economy ==
Poverty incidence of Brooke's Point (%)

Source: Philippine Statistics Authority

Brooke's Point is one of Palawan's main economic centers outside Puerto Princesa, along with Narra, Coron and Cuyo. The town is home to several banks including the Land Bank and Rural Bank of Brooke's Point. Money transfer companies such as Western Union and MoneyGram also have branches in the town. There are several pawnshops like M Lhullier, Cebuana Lhuillier, among others. The town also has a Mercury Drug and a Generic Pharmacy.

Commercial enterprises in the town are thriving, with numerous medium-sized stores concentrated in the town proper. The service sector has also expanded alongside the growth of various commercial establishments. The local economy remains primarily agriculture-based, with significant production of rice, copra, and corn. The palm oil industry, headquartered in Barangay Mainit in the southern part of the municipality, also plays a key role in economic activity. Unlike many towns in Palawan, Brooke’s Point is not known for white-sand beaches that attract large numbers of tourists. However, its abundant freshwater resources make it one of the province’s most productive agricultural areas, supporting the cultivation of a wide variety of fruits and vegetables.

In addition, the town is also one of the Philippines' gateways to Southeast Asia. Its proximity to Sabah is a strategic advantage, but the lack of infrastructure and an inter-governmental agreement between Malaysia and the Philippines hinders the town from being a trading hub. There is minimal trade with Malaysia through many of the town's Muslim and Christian residents who have relatives in Sabah. The town is supposed to become an international port with cargo services to Sabah and Brunei.

== Infrastructure ==
=== Transportation ===
Brooke's Point has a modern seaport that serves many cargo ships from Manila, Mindanao, the Visayas and other parts of Luzon. The port also caters to numerous fishing vessels. Commercial vessels from Malaysia, Indonesia and other countries also make frequent stops in the port. The port also serves as a docking point for vessels containing commercial goods from Manila and abroad, and also mining-related materials to Rio Tuba. The port of Brooke's Point is considered as one of the most profitable ports in the southern Philippines.

The El Nido-Bataraza highway connects the town to other mainland towns and municipalities. Transportation between Puerto Princesa and Brooke's Point is through commercial vans, buses or jeepneys. There is also a private airport located at Lada. Transportation throughout the town is through tricycle and multi-cabs. Kuliglig, a machine also used for agriculture, is widely used as a means of transportation in rural areas.

== Healthcare ==
Health facilities in the municipality include Southern Palawan Provincial Hospital (a 25-bed capacity secondary government hospital), a Rural Health Unit (RHU), Barangay Health Stations (BHS), and private clinics and hospitals. Dental and optical clinics, laboratories, and drugstores are also present and serve not only Brooke's Point, but also neighboring municipalities.

Currently, there are three private hospitals.

== Education ==
There are three schools district offices which govern all educational institutions within the municipality. They oversee the management and operations of all private and public, from primary to secondary schools. These are the:

- Brooke's Point II (Sofronio Española) Schools District
- North Brooke's Point Schools District
- South Brooke's Point Schools District

There are 9 secondary schools in Brooke's Point. Brooke's Point Christian High School, a Christian-run institution, and the Sacred Heart of Jesus High School administered by the Augustinians are located in the town center. Public secondary schools include the Brooke's Point National High School, Governor Abueg Memorial and Vocational High school, and more. There are also at least 40 public elementary schools.

=== Primary and elementary schools ===
- Abubakar Elementary School
- Amas Elementary School
- Aribungos Elementary School
- Barongbarong Elementary School
- Bayog Elementary School
- Bidang Elementary School
- Brooke's Point Central School SPED Center
- Brookes Point United Methodist Elementary School
- Cabangaan Elementary School
- Cabar Elementary School
- Calasaguen Highway Elementary School (Calasaguen Elementary School)
- Calasaguen Shore Elementary School
- Danadio Elementary School
- Felipe D. Irader Elementary School
- Good News Child Development Center
- Imulnod Elementary School
- Ipilan Central School
- Kilala Elementary School
- Lada Elementary School
- Linao Elementary School
- Maasin Elementary School
- Macagua Elementary School
- Mainit Elementary School
- Malis Elementary School
- Mambalot Elementary School
- Mangkongon Elementary School
- Maquina B. Tunggal Memorial Elementary School (Tubtub Elementary School)
- Maribong Elementary School
- Mary Edward Venturanza Elementary School (Buligay Elementary School)
- Mate Elementary School
- New Panay Elementary School
- Oring-Oring Elementary School
- Palawan Aid International-Kabatangan View School
- Paratungon East Elementary School
- Paratungon Elementary School
- Pulot Adventist Elementary School
- Proyekto Setias Memorial Elementary School (Tagpirara Elementary School)
- Rafael R. Estiandian Memorial Elementary School (Pangobilian Elementary School)
- Rizal Elementary School
- Salogon Elementary School
- Samariñana Elementary School
- Saraza Elementary School
- Southern Palawan Christian Academy
- Tagpinasao Elementary School
- Tagusao Shore Elementary School
- Tulatula Elementary School

=== Secondary schools ===
- Brooke's Point Christian High School
- Brooke's Point National High School - Pangobilian National High School
- Calasaguen National High School
- Eliseo A. Lagrada Oblian National High School
- Gov. Alfredo Abueg Sr. National Technology & Vocational Memorial High School
- Inil U. Taha National High School
- Ipilan National High School
- Maasin National High School (Bernas National High School)
- Malis National High School
- Sacred Heart of Jesus High School
- Samariñana National High School
- Vito Pechangco Memorial National High School
- Wenceslao Villapa High School (Mainit National High School)

=== Higher educational institutions ===
- Palawan State University
- Southern Palawan College

== Media ==
=== Radio ===
==== AM ====
- 1431 kHz (Radio Philippines Network)

==== FM ====
- 95.7 MHz (Information Broadcast Unlimited)
- 102.1 MHz (Allied Broadcasting Center)
- DWBP 103.7 MHz - Brigada News FM Brooke's Point (Baycomms Broadcasting Corporation)
- DWMI 104.5 MHz - Radyo Natin Brooke's Point (MBC Media Group)
- 105.3 MHz - (Beacon Communications System)

=== TV ===
- DYAA 6 - GMA Brooke's Point (GMA Network)

== Environmental issues ==
Many parts of the town's forests are cleared to give way for agriculture. Slash and burn agriculture is a common practice in the town's interior. Burning of garbage and waste are common, as is illegal fishing. Illegal logging is done on a small basis, but it has a substantial impact on the town's forest cover. Small-scale illegal pet trade also exists. Mynahs, parrots and pangolins, as well as many animals found only in Palawan, are poached and traded to other parts of the country and abroad. Although the practice is increasingly common, many of these activities are not known to authorities.

In recent years, the local government along with the National government has enacted several policies and programs to protect the environment. But apathy and corruption hinder government efforts to implement these policies and programs.

A long-running dispute exists over the establishment of a nickel mine within what is now the Mount Mantalingahan Protected Landscape. And within the Tribal zone and ancestral domains of the Palawan (Pala’wan) Indigenous Peoples. Conservation International Philippines lists a field office in Brooke's Point as part of its operations in Palawan.
