= DWLA =

DWLA may refer to the Philippine broadcast stations:

- DWLA-FM (105.9 FM), an FM radio station broadcasting in Metro Manila, branded as True FM
- DWLA-TV (channel 12), a television station broadcasting in Legazpi, Albay, branded as GMA TV-12 Legazpi
