= Sofronio Española =

Municipality in Palawan, Philippines

- Municipality
- Municipality of Sofronio Española
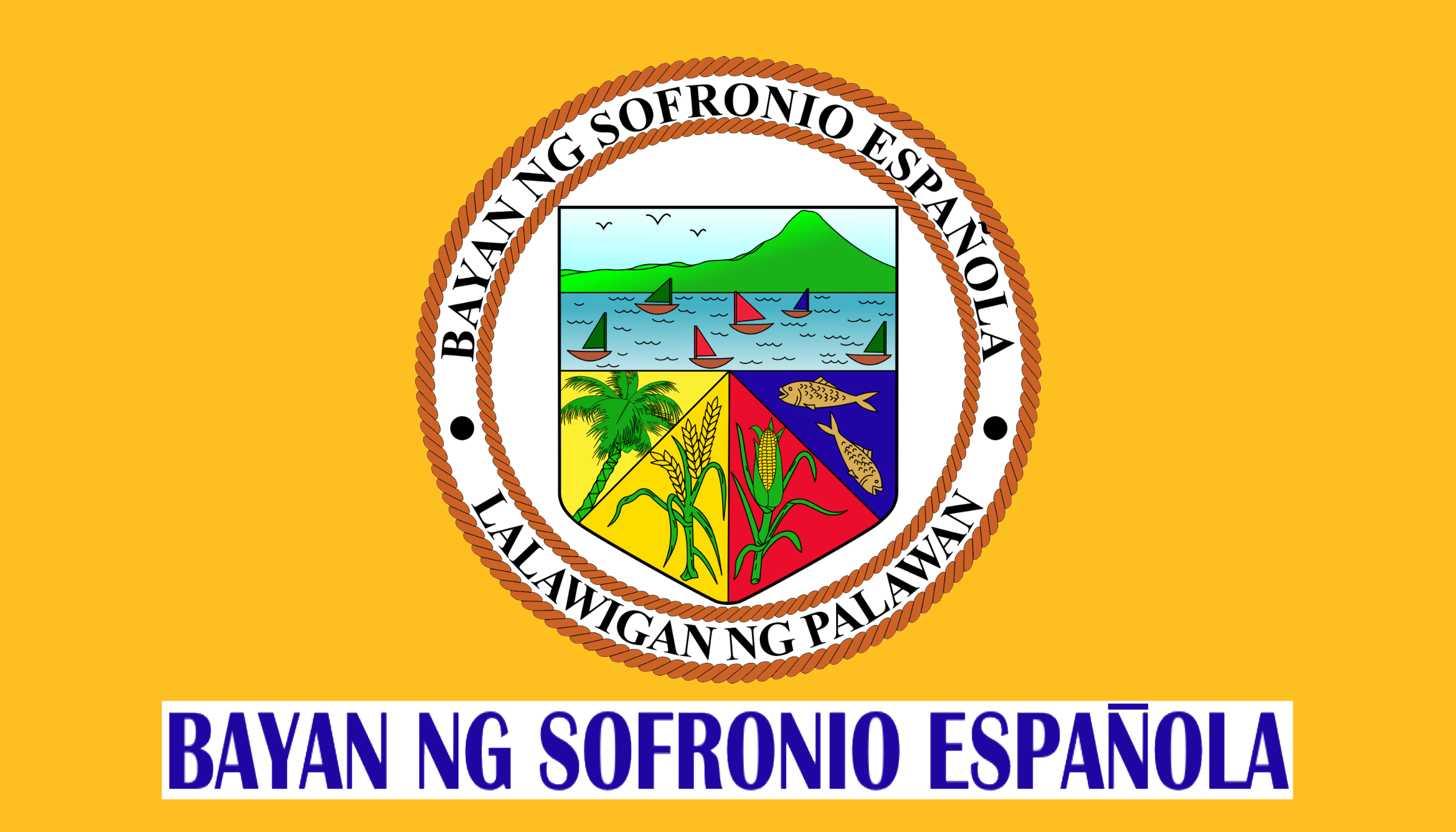
- Flag Seal

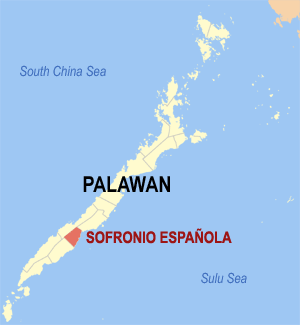
- Map of Palawan with Sofronio Española highlighted
- Interactive map of Sofronio Española
- Location within the Philippines
- Coordinates: 8°57′17″N 117°59′38″E
- Country: Philippines
- Region: Mimaropa
- Province: Palawan
- District: 2nd district
- Founded: June 5, 1995
- Named for: Sofronio Española
- Barangays: 9 (see Barangays)

Government
  - Type: Sangguniang Bayan
  - Mayor: Abner Rafael N. Tesorio
  - Vice Mayor: Juhad I. Harmain
  - Representative: Jose Ch. Alvarez
  - Municipal Council: Members: Juhad I. Harmain; Jonathan T. Chua; Michael L. Diordia; Fred A. Gatungay, Jr.; Arsani K. Bernardo; Nena P. Sahibol; Diosdado A. Tingson; Arnold A. Galan
  - Electorate: 24,345 voters (2025)

Area
  - Total: 473.91 km^{2} (182.98 sq mi)
- Elevation: 37 m (121 ft)
- Highest elevation: 204 m (669 ft)
- Lowest elevation: 0 m (0 ft)

Population (2024 census)
  - Total: 39,371
  - Density: 83.077/km^{2} (215.17/sq mi)
  - Households: 9,918

Economy
  - Income class: 1st municipal income class
  - Poverty incidence: 29.42% (2023)
  - Revenue: ₱ 292.6 million (2024)
  - Assets: ₱ 898.9 million (2024)
  - Expenditure: ₱ 298.8 million (2024)
  - Liabilities: ₱ 344.3 million (2024)

Service provider
  - Electricity: Palawan Electric Cooperative (PALECO)
- Time zone: UTC+8 (PST)
- ZIP code: 5324
- PSGC: 1705324000
- IDD : area code: +63 (0)48
- Native languages: Palawano; Tagalog

Sofronio Española, officially the Municipality of Sofronio Española (Tagalog: Bayan ng Sofronio Española), is a municipality in the province of Palawan, Philippines. According to the 2024 census, it has a population of 39,371 people.

It is the province's newest municipality, officially established on June 5, 1995, and Iber Chou became the first Municipality Mayor, when Republic Act No. 7679 partitioned the town from Brooke's Point. It was named after the late Palawan Representative and Governor Sofronio Española.

== History ==
The creation of the Municipality of Sofronio Española took nearly three decades to materialize. It began with Resolution No. 120, dated December 12, 1988, of the Sangguniang Bayan of Brooke’s Point, which proposed the separation of its northern barangays—Abo-Abo, Isumbo, Panitian, Labog, Punang, Iraray, Pulot Shore, Pulot Center, and Pulot Interior—into a new municipality. The proposed entity was to be named Sofronio Española in honor of the late Congressman Sofronio Española of Palawan’s then lone district. This initiative was further strengthened by a barangay resolution dated April 16, 1990, issued by Barangay Pulot, which formally requested House Speaker Ramon V. Mitra Jr. to support and facilitate the creation of the new municipality.

On July 9, 1992, Hon. Alfredo E. Abueg, Jr., then congressman of the Second District of Palawan, filed House Bill No. 60, an Act creating the Municipality of Sofronio Española in the Province of Palawan. To expedite the approval of this bill, Board Member Cipriano Barroma sponsored Sangguniang Panlalawigan Resolution No. 120 on April 16, 1993.

The House of Representatives approved Republic Act 7679, the law creating the Municipality of Sofronio Española in the Province of Palawan on August 3, 1993, and by the Senate on November 25, 1993. Finally, the law creating Sofronio Española was lapsed into law.

Section 1 of RA 7679 states that Barangays Pulot Center, Pulot Shore (Pulot I), Pulot Interior (Pulot II), Iraray, Punang, Labog, Panitian, Isumbo and Abo-Abo are to be separated from the Municipality of Brooke’s Point and constituted into a distinct and independent municipality of the province to be known as the Municipality of Sofronio Española. The seat of government shall be in Barangay Pulot Center.

== Geography ==
Sofronio Española is located in the southern part of Palawan along its eastern seaboard, beginning at kilometer 128.1 to kilometer 166 of the National Highway (Puerto Princesa City, South Road). It lies approximately between 8 53’3.58” to 9 11’26.26” North and 117 51’24.42” to 118 7’35.58” East. It is bounded on the north by Narra, on the south by Brooke's Point, on the east by the Sulu Sea, and on the West by Quezon. It is 163 kilometres (101 mi) from Puerto Princesa.

=== Barangays ===
Sofronio Española is politically subdivided into 9 barangays. Each barangay consists of puroks and some have sitios.

- Abo-Abo
- Iraray
- Isumbo
- Labog
- Panitian
- Pulot Center
- Pulot Interior (Pulot II)
- Pulot Shore (Pulot I)
- Punang

=== Climate ===
Climate data for Sofronio Española
Month	Jan	Feb	Mar	Apr	May	Jun	Jul	Aug	Sep	Oct	Nov	Dec	Year
Mean daily maximum °C (°F)	30 (86)	30 (86)	31 (88)	31 (88)	31 (88)	30 (86)	29 (84)	29 (84)	29 (84)	29 (84)	29 (84)	29 (84)	30 (86)
Mean daily minimum °C (°F)	24 (75)	23 (73)	24 (75)	25 (77)	25 (77)	25 (77)	25 (77)	25 (77)	25 (77)	25 (77)	25 (77)	24 (75)	25 (76)
Average precipitation mm (inches)	85 (3.3)	69 (2.7)	100 (3.9)	105 (4.1)	202 (8.0)	246 (9.7)	241 (9.5)	215 (8.5)	236 (9.3)	262 (10.3)	231 (9.1)	144 (5.7)	2,136 (84.1)
Average rainy days	15.6	13.3	17.5	19.9	27.4	28.1	29.4	28.6	28.6	28.8	26.4	21.0	284.6
Source: Meteoblue

Sofronio Española is characterized by type I climate – a pronounced wet and dry season. The wet season is from May to November, while the dry season is from December to April. The prevailing winds in the municipality are the Northeast Monsoon (Amihan) and the Southwest Monsoon (Habagat). The Northeast Monsoon blows the sea into fury from November to March. The Southwest Monsoon is stronger than the Northeast Monsoon with gusts of up 60kph or more and usually blows from June to September. In between the two-monsoon wind is the lull season. This is usually during the months of April and May of every year. During this period, the sea is as smooth as glass, and since it is also the peak of the dry season, it is the best time for sea travel and other sea activities.

== Demographics ==
Population census of Sofronio Española
Year	Pop.	±% p.a.
1995	22,986	—
2000	26,801	+3.35%
2007	28,698	+0.95%
2010	29,997	+1.62%
2015	32,876	+1.76%
2020	37,416	+2.76%
2024	39,371	+1.23%
Source: Philippine Statistics Authority

In the 2024 census, the population of Sofronio Española was 39,371 people, with a density of 83 inhabitants per square kilometre or 210 inhabitants per square mile.

=== Religion ===
Based on the religion of the population of Sofronio Española in 2024, the majority were Christianity (96.4%), followed by Islam (3.2%), and others (0.4%). In this municipality, Christianity, especially Catholicism, is practiced by Tagalog-speaking people and the indigenous peoples of Palawan. Meanwhile, Islam is practiced by some of the native Palawano people, as well as Moro immigrants, especially the Maranao and Tausug.

Barangay Abo-Abo is one of the first places where the Muslim of Tausug people officially established a settlement, during the Spanish government era, precisely during the reign of the 31st Sultan of Sulu, Harun Ar-Rashid, was exiled to Palawan in 1894.

== Economy ==
Poverty incidence of Sofronio Española (%)

Source: Philippine Statistics Authority

== Education ==
The Brooke's Point II (Sofronio Española) Schools District Office governs all educational institutions within the municipality. It oversees the management and operations of all private and public, from primary to secondary schools.

=== Primary and elementary schools ===
- Aboabo Elementary School
- Bengao Cunsang Elementary School
- Bidang Elementary School
- Caramay Elementary School
- Carasanan Elementary School
- El Salvador Elementary School
- Eniaran Elementary School
- Espanola Bible Baptist Academy
- Ipaputo Elementary School
- Iraray Elementary School
- Isumbo Elementary School
- Labog Elementary School
- Luntab Elementary School
- Malanap Highway Elementary School
- Malanap Interior Elementary School
- Malangse Hillside Elementary School
- Maribong Elementary School
- Naltep Elementary School
- Olympic Elementary School
- Palawan Sofronio Christian Bible Baptist Academy
- Pangatban Elementary School
- Panitian Elementary School
- Panitian Interior Elementary School
- Pinawpawan Elementary School
- Sofronio Española Central School
- Pulot Adventist Elementary School
- Pulot Interior Elementary School
- Pulot Shore Elementary School
- Punang Elementary School
- Sincab Elementary School
- Suked Elementary School
- Tagbabalat Elementary School

=== Secondary schools ===
- Abo-Abo National High School
- Labog National High School
- Panitian National High School
- Pulot National High School
- Punang National High School
