= Rádio Observador =

- Lisbon; Portugal
- Frequencies: 92.8/98.7 MHz Lisbon, 88.1/98.4 MHz Porto

Programming
- Language: Portuguese
- Format: Information

Ownership
- Owner: Observador On Time, S.A.

History
- First air date: 27 June 2019

Links
- Webcast: https://observador.pt/player/
- Website: https://observador.pt/radio/

Rádio Observador is a Portuguese radio station. It was launched on 98.7 MHz in the Lisbon Metropolitan Area with about 30 collaborators, on 27 June 2019. In October 2019, it launched on 98.4 MHz in the Porto Metropolitan Area. The radio focuses on information but also airs music, talk shows and live football match reports. Its many programs are also published in podcast format and the radio is also continuously broadcast on-line. It belongs to the same media group of Observador, a Portuguese online newspaper started on 19 May 2014.

== Expansion ==
Initially the station was limited to Lisbon. On 6 October 2019, it started broadcasting to Porto on 98.4 FM. On 21 January 2021, it started broadcasting to Aveiro on 88.1 FM, with the antenna located in São João da Madeira and, on 19 March 2021, started broadcasting on 93.7 MHz in Amadora, increasing its coverage in the Lisbon area. On 1 June 2023, Rádio Observador started broadcasting to the Ribatejo and the Western Region on 92.6 FM and 99.5 FM in Rio Maior. On 12 July 2024 the station expanded to the Leiria region replacing Rádio 94FM and is in the process of buying Emissora das Beiras in Tondela. On 19 July 2025, aiming to reach listeners in the Portuguese capital with even higher quality, Rádio Observador's broadcast in Greater Lisbon migrated from the 93.7 FM frequency (from its old transmitter in Amadora) to 92.8 FM (from its new transmitter located in Loures).
